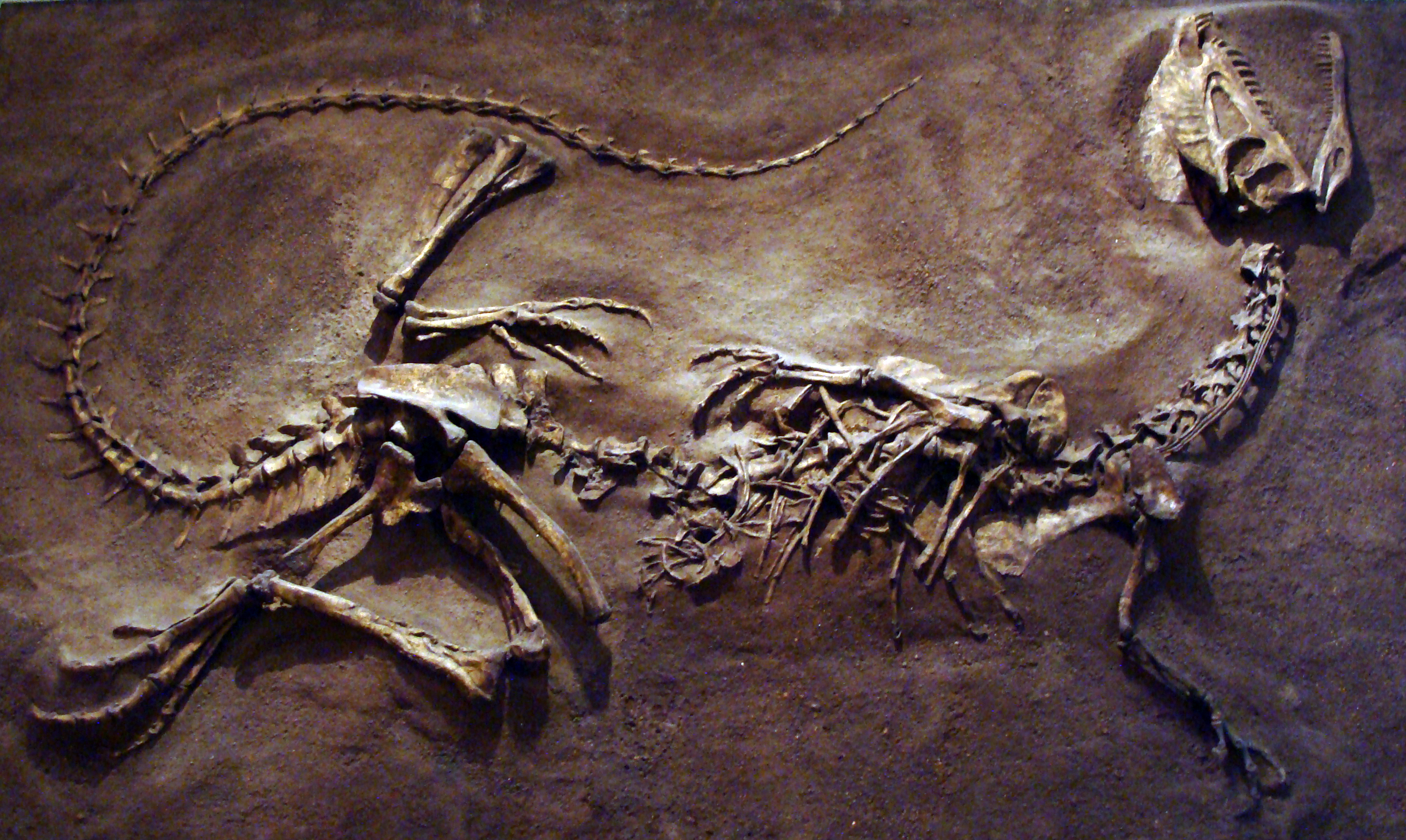
- Reconstructed cast of the holotype specimen (UCMP 37302) in position of burial, Royal Ontario Museum

Scientific classification
- Kingdom: Animalia
- Phylum: Chordata
- Class: Reptilia
- Clade: Dinosauria
- Clade: Saurischia
- Clade: Theropoda
- Clade: Averostriformes
- Genus: †Dilophosaurus; Welles, 1970
- Species: †D. wetherilli

Binomial name
- †Dilophosaurus wetherilli (Welles, 1954)

Synonyms
- Megalosaurus wetherilli Welles, 1954

= Dilophosaurus =

Dilophosaurus Temporal range: Early Jurassic (Sinemurian–Toarcian), 195.2–183.7 Ma

Genus of theropod dinosaur from the Early Jurassic

Dilophosaurus (/daɪˌloʊfəˈsɔːrəs, -foʊ-/ dy-LOH-fə-SOR-əs, -foh-) is a genus of theropod dinosaurs that lived in what is now North America during the Early Jurassic, about 186 million years ago. Three skeletons were discovered in northern Arizona in 1940, and the two best preserved were collected in 1942. The most complete specimen became the holotype of a new species in the genus Megalosaurus, named M. wetherilli by Samuel P. Welles in 1954. Welles found a larger skeleton in the same region belonging to the same species in 1964. Realizing it bore crests on its skull, he assigned the species to the new genus Dilophosaurus in 1970, as Dilophosaurus wetherilli. The genus name means "two-crested lizard", and the species name honors John Wetherill, an explorer and amateur archeologist. Further specimens have since been found, including an infant. Fossil footprints have also been attributed to the animal, including resting traces. Another species, Dilophosaurus sinensis from China, was named in 1993, but was later found to belong to the genus Sinosaurus.

At about 7 metres (23 ft) in length, with a weight of about 400 kg (880 lb), Dilophosaurus was one of the earliest large predatory dinosaurs and the largest-known land animal in North America at the time. It was slender and lightly built, and the skull was proportionally large. The snout was narrow, and the upper jaw had a gap or kink below the nostril. It had a pair of longitudinal, arched crests on its skull; their complete shape is unknown, but they were probably enlarged by keratin. The mandible was slender at the front, but deep at the back. The teeth were long, curved, thin, and compressed sideways. Those in the lower jaw were much smaller than those of the upper jaw. Most of the teeth had serrations at their front and back edges. The neck was long, and its vertebrae were hollow, and very light. The arms were powerful, with a long and slender upper arm bone. The hands had four fingers; the first was short but strong and bore a large claw, the two following fingers were longer and slenderer with smaller claws; the fourth was vestigial. The thigh bone was massive, the feet were stout, and the toes bore large claws.

Dilophosaurus has been considered a member of the family Dilophosauridae along with Dracovenator, a group placed between the Coelophysidae and later theropods, but some researchers have not found support for this grouping. Dilophosaurus would have been active and bipedal, and may have hunted large animals; it could also have fed on smaller animals and fish. Due to the limited range of movement and shortness of the forelimbs, the mouth may instead have made first contact with prey. The function of the crests is unknown; they were too weak for battle, but may have been used in visual display, such as species recognition and sexual selection. It may have grown rapidly, attaining a growth rate of 30 to 35 kg (66 to 77 lb) per year early in life. The holotype specimen had multiple paleopathologies, including healed injuries and signs of a developmental anomaly. Dilophosaurus is known from the Kayenta Formation, and lived alongside dinosaurs such as Scutellosaurus and Sarahsaurus. It was designated as the state dinosaur of Connecticut based on tracks found there. Dilophosaurus was featured in the novel Jurassic Park and its movie adaptation, where it was given the fictional abilities to spit venom and expand a neck frill, and was depicted as smaller than the real animal.

== History of discovery ==
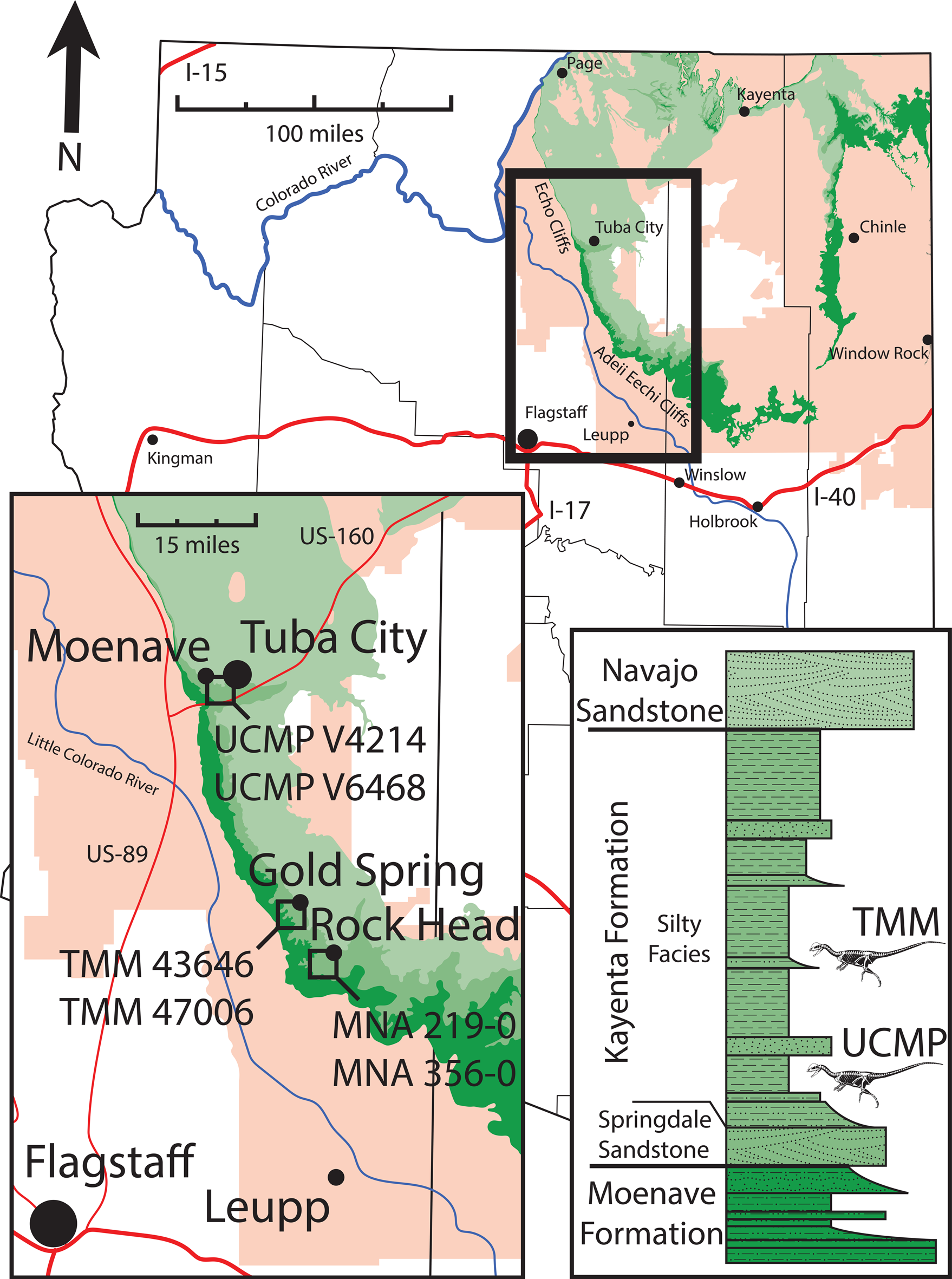
Map showing localities in northern Arizona where Dilophosaurus fossils have been collected (squares)

In the summer of 1942, the paleontologist Charles L. Camp led a field party from the University of California Museum of Paleontology (UCMP) in search of fossil vertebrates in Navajo County in northern Arizona. Word of this was spread among the Native Americans there, and the Navajo Jesse Williams brought three members of the expedition to some fossil bones he had discovered in 1940. The area was part of the Kayenta Formation, about 32 km (20 mi) north of Cameron near Tuba City in the Navajo Indian Reservation. Three dinosaur skeletons were found in purplish shale, arranged in a triangle, about 9.1 m (30 ft) long at one side. The first was nearly complete, lacking only the front of the skull, parts of the pelvis, and some vertebrae. The second was very eroded, included the front of the skull, lower jaws, some vertebrae, limb bones, and an articulated hand. The third was so eroded that it consisted only of vertebral fragments. The first good skeleton was encased in a block of plaster after 10 days of work and loaded onto a truck, the second skeleton was easily collected, as it was almost entirely weathered out of the ground, but the third skeleton was almost gone.

The nearly complete first specimen was cleaned and mounted at the UCMP under supervision of the paleontologist Wann Langston, a process that took three men two years. The skeleton was wall-mounted in bas relief, with the tail curved upwards, the neck straightened, and the left leg moved up for visibility, but the rest of the skeleton was kept in its burial position. As the skull was crushed, it was reconstructed based on the back of the skull of the first specimen and the front of the second. The pelvis was reconstructed after that of Allosaurus, and the feet were also reconstructed. At the time, it was one of the best-preserved skeletons of a theropod dinosaur, though incomplete. In 1954, the paleontologist Samuel P. Welles, who was part of the group who excavated the skeletons, preliminarily described and named this dinosaur as a new species in the existing genus Megalosaurus, M. wetherilli. The nearly complete specimen (catalogued as UCMP 37302) was made the holotype of the species, and the second specimen (UCMP 37303) was made the paratype. The specific name honored John Wetherill, a Navajo councilor whom Welles described as an "explorer, friend of scientists, and trusted trader". Wetherill's nephew, Milton, had first informed the expedition of the fossils. Welles placed the new species in Megalosaurus due to the similar limb proportions of it and M. bucklandii, and because he did not find great differences between them. At the time, Megalosaurus was used as a "wastebasket taxon", wherein many species of theropods were placed, regardless of their age or locality.

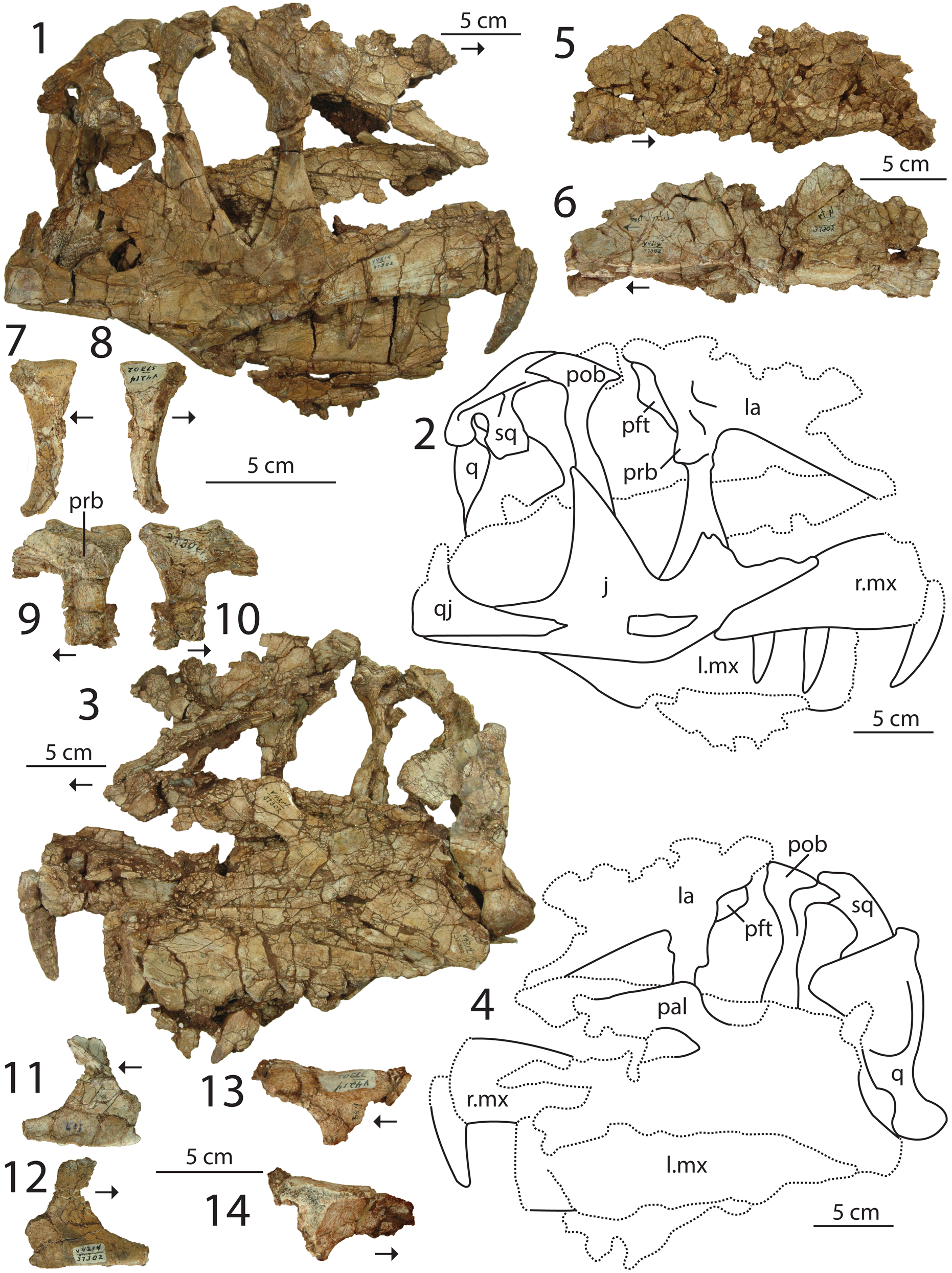
Right hind part of the holotype skull and crest pieces (left), parts of the mandible (middle), and braincase (right)

Welles returned to Tuba City in 1964 to determine the age of the Kayenta Formation (it had been suggested to be Late Triassic in age, whereas Welles thought it was Early to Middle Jurassic), and discovered another skeleton about 400 m (1/4 mi) south of where the 1942 specimens had been found. The nearly complete specimen (catalogued as UCMP 77270) was collected with the help of William J. Breed of the Museum of Northern Arizona and others. During preparation of this specimen, it became clear that it was a larger individual of M. wetherilli, and that it would have had two crests on the top of its skull. Being a thin plate of bone, one crest was originally thought to be part of the missing left side of the skull, which may had been pulled out of its position by a scavenger. When it became apparent that it was a crest, it was also realized that a corresponding crest would have been on the left side, since the right crest was right of the midline, and was concave along its middle length. This discovery led to re-examination of the holotype specimen, which was found to have bases of two thin, upwards-extended bones, which were crushed together. These also represented crests, but they had formerly been assumed to be part of a misplaced cheek bone. The two 1942 specimens were also found to be juveniles, while the 1964 specimen was an adult, about one-third larger than the others. Welles later recalled that he thought the crests were as unexpected as finding "wings on a worm".

=== New genus and subsequent discoveries ===
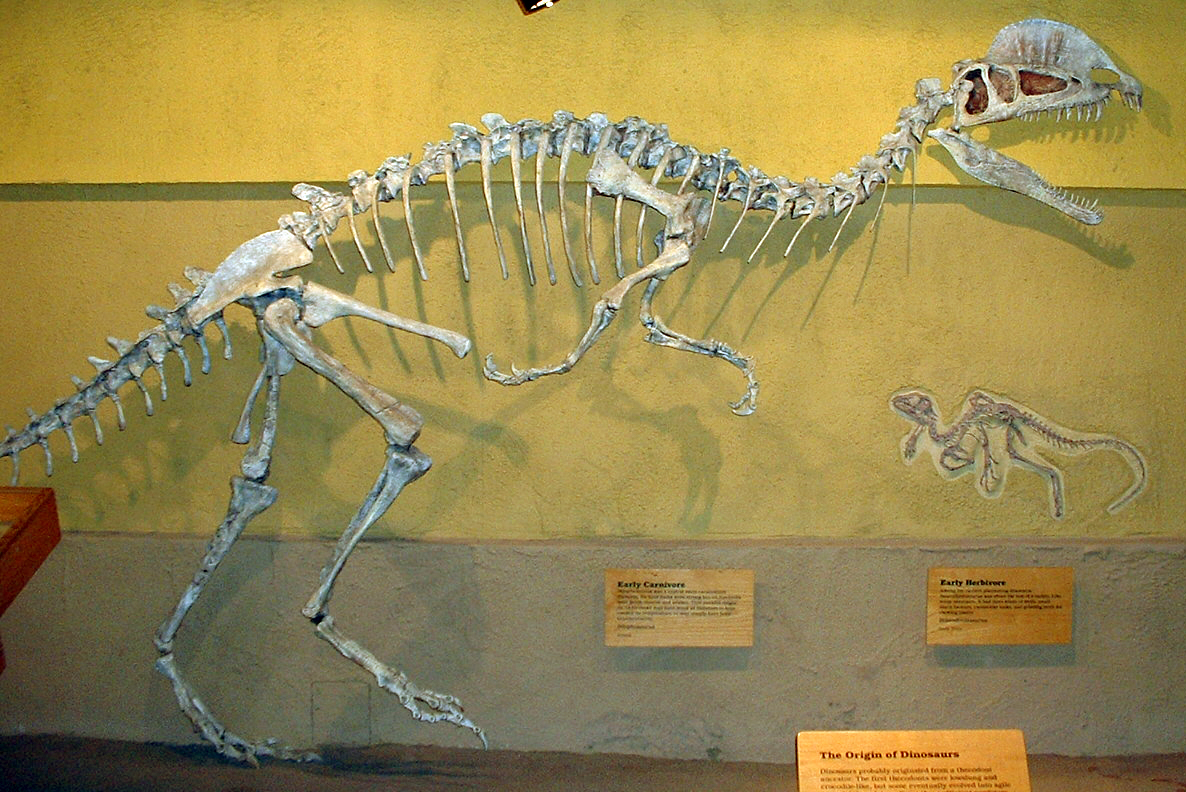
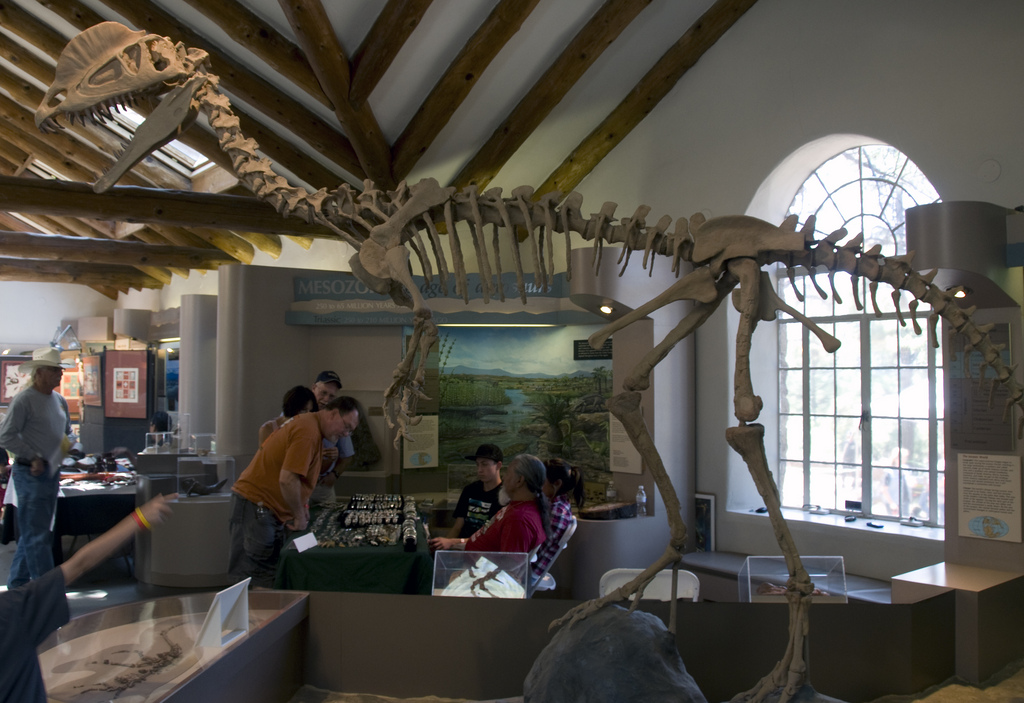
Reconstructed skeletons at Royal Tyrrell Museum (left) and Museum of Northern Arizona with outdated (pronated) hand postures. The right mount was the first three-dimensional standing skeleton of Dilophosaurus.

Welles and an assistant subsequently corrected the wall mount of the holotype specimen based on the new skeleton, by restoring the crests, redoing the pelvis, making the neck ribs longer, and placing them closer together. After studying the skeletons of North American and European theropods, Welles realized that the dinosaur did not belong to Megalosaurus, and needed a new genus name. At that time, no other theropods with large longitudinal crests on their heads were known, and the dinosaur had therefore gained the interest of paleontologists. A mold of the holotype specimen was made, and fiberglass casts of it were distributed to various exhibits; to make labeling these casts easier, Welles decided to name the new genus in a brief note, rather than wait until the publication of a detailed description. In 1970, Welles coined the new genus name Dilophosaurus, from the Greek words di (δι) meaning "two", lophos (λόφος) meaning "crest", and sauros (σαυρος) meaning "lizard": "two-crested lizard". Welles published a detailed osteological description of Dilophosaurus in 1984, but did not include the 1964 specimen, since he thought it belonged to a different genus. Dilophosaurus was the first well-known theropod from the Early Jurassic, and remains one of the best-preserved examples of that age.

Skull elements (left), mandible (middle), and hind skull elements (right) of assigned specimen TMM 43646-1

In 2001, the paleontologist Robert J. Gay identified the remains of at least three new Dilophosaurus specimens (this number is based on the presence of three pubic bone fragments and two differentially sized femora) in the collections of the Museum of Northern Arizona. The specimens were found in 1978 in the Rock Head Quadrangle, 190 km (120 mi) away from where the original specimens were found, and had been labeled as a "large theropod". Though most of the material is damaged, it is significant in including elements not preserved in the earlier specimens, including part of the pelvis and several ribs. Some elements in the collection belonged to an infant specimen (MNA P1.3181), the youngest-known example of this genus, and one of the earliest-known infant theropods from North America, only preceded by some Coelophysis specimens. The juvenile specimen includes a partial humerus, a partial fibula, and a tooth fragment. In 2005, paleontologist Ronald S. Tykoski assigned a specimen (TMM 43646-140) from Gold Spring, Arizona, to Dilophosaurus, but in 2012, paleontologist Matthew T. Carrano and colleagues found it to differ in some details.

In 2020, the paleontologists Adam D. Marsh and Timothy B. Rowe comprehensively redescribed Dilophosaurus based on the by then known specimens, including specimen UCMP 77270 which had remained undescribed since 1964. They also removed some previously assigned specimens, finding them too fragmentary to identify, and relocated the type quarry with the help of a relative of Jesse Williams. In an interview, Marsh called Dilophosaurus the "best worst-known dinosaur", since the animal was poorly understood despite having been discovered 80 years earlier. A major problem was that previous studies of the specimens did not make clear which parts were original fossils and which were reconstructed in plaster, yet subsequent researchers only had Welles' 1984 monograph to rely on for subsequent studies, muddling understanding of the dinosaur's anatomy. Marsh spent seven years studying the specimens to clarify the issues surrounding the dinosaur, including two specimens found two decades earlier by Rowe, his Ph.D. advisor.

=== Formerly assigned species ===
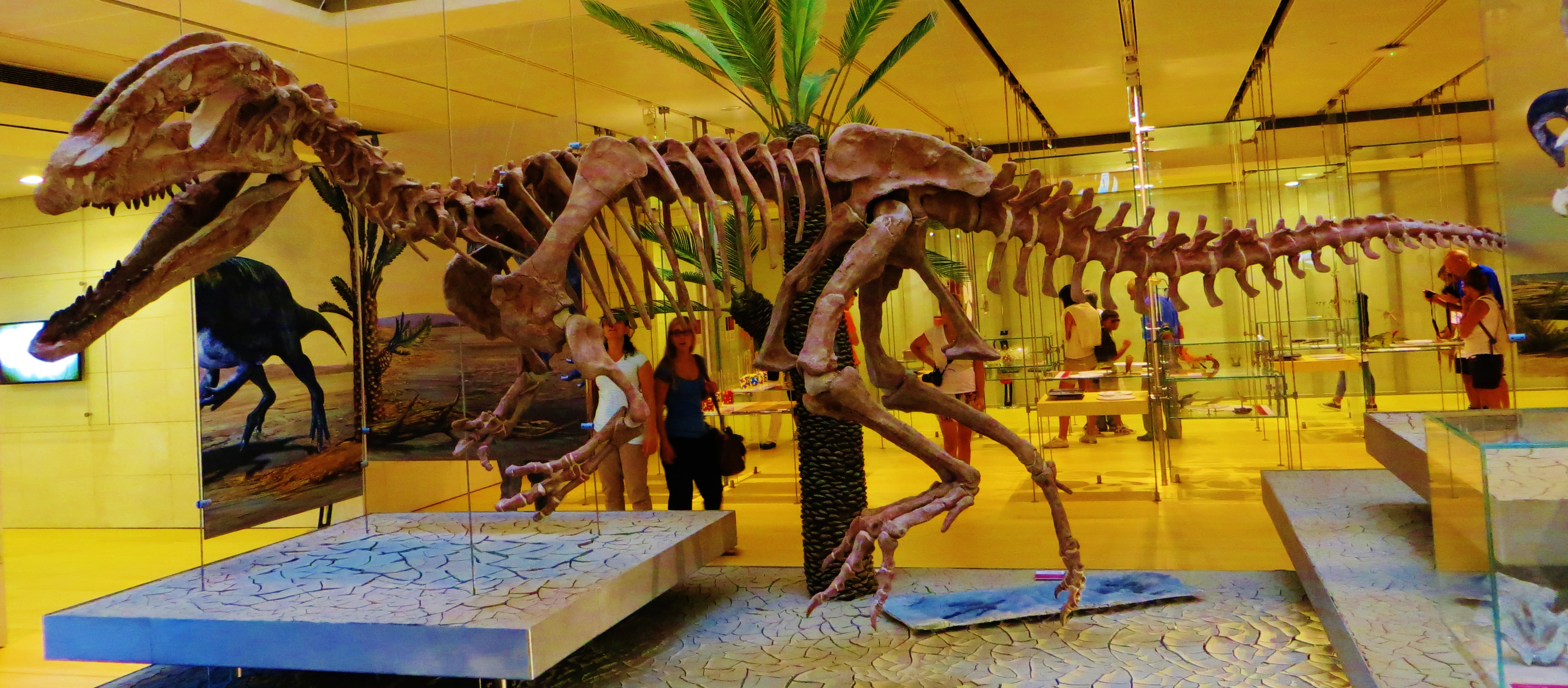
Reconstructed skeleton of Sinosaurus sinensis from China, originally described as a species of Dilophosaurus, Museo delle Scienze

In 1984, Welles suggested that the 1964 specimen (UCMP 77270) did not belong to Dilophosaurus, but to a new genus, based on differences in the skull, vertebrae, and femora. He maintained that both genera bore crests, but that the exact shape of these was unknown in Dilophosaurus. Welles died in 1997, before he could name this supposed new dinosaur, and the idea that the two were separate genera has generally been ignored or forgotten since. In 1999, amateur paleontologist Stephan Pickering privately published the new name Dilophosaurus "breedorum" based on the 1964 specimen, named in honor of Breed, who had assisted in collecting it. This name is considered a nomen nudum, an invalidly published name, and Gay pointed out in 2005 that no significant differences exist between D. "breedorum" and other D. wetherilli specimens. In 2012, Carrano and colleagues found differences between the 1964 specimen and the holotype specimen, but attributed them to variation between individuals rather than species. Paleontologists Christophe Hendrickx and Octávio Mateus suggested in 2014 that the known specimens might represent two species of Dilophosaurus based on different skull features and stratigraphic separation, pending thorough description of assigned specimens. Marsh and Rowe concluded in 2020 that there was only one taxon among known Dilophosaurus specimens, and that differences between them were due to their different degree of maturity and preservation. They did not find considerable stratigraphic separation between the specimens either.

A nearly complete theropod skeleton (KMV 8701) was discovered in the Lufeng Formation, in Yunnan Province, China, in 1987. It is similar to Dilophosaurus, with a pair of crests and a gap separating the premaxilla from the maxilla, but differs in some details. The paleontologist Shaojin Hu named it as a new species of Dilophosaurus in 1993, D. sinensis (from Greek Sinai, referring to China). In 1998, the paleontologist Matthew C. Lamanna and colleagues found D. sinensis to be identical to Sinosaurus triassicus, a theropod from the same formation, named in 1940. This conclusion was confirmed by paleontologist Lida Xing and colleagues in 2013, and though paleontologist Guo-Fu Wang and colleagues agreed the species belonged in Sinosaurus in 2017, they suggested it may be a separate species, S. sinensis.

== Description ==
Size of the largest-known (left) and holotype (right) specimens compared to a human

Dilophosaurus was one of the earliest large predatory dinosaurs, a medium-sized theropod, though small compared to some of the later theropods. It was also the largest-known land animal of North America during the Early Jurassic. Slender and lightly built, its size was comparable to that of a brown bear. The largest-known specimen weighed about 400 kilograms (880 lb), measured about 7 meters (23 ft) in length, and its skull was 590 millimeters (23 1/4 in) long. The smaller holotype specimen weighed about 283 kilograms (624 lb), was 6.03 meters (19 ft 9 1/2 in) long, with a hip height of about 1.36 meters (4 ft 5 1/2 in), and its skull was 523 millimeters (1 ft 8 1/2 in) long. A resting trace of a theropod similar to Dilophosaurus and Liliensternus has been interpreted by some researchers as showing impressions of feathers around the belly and feet, similar to down. Other researchers instead interpret these impressions as sedimentological artifacts created as the dinosaur moved, though this interpretation does not rule out that the track-maker could have borne feathers.

=== Skull ===
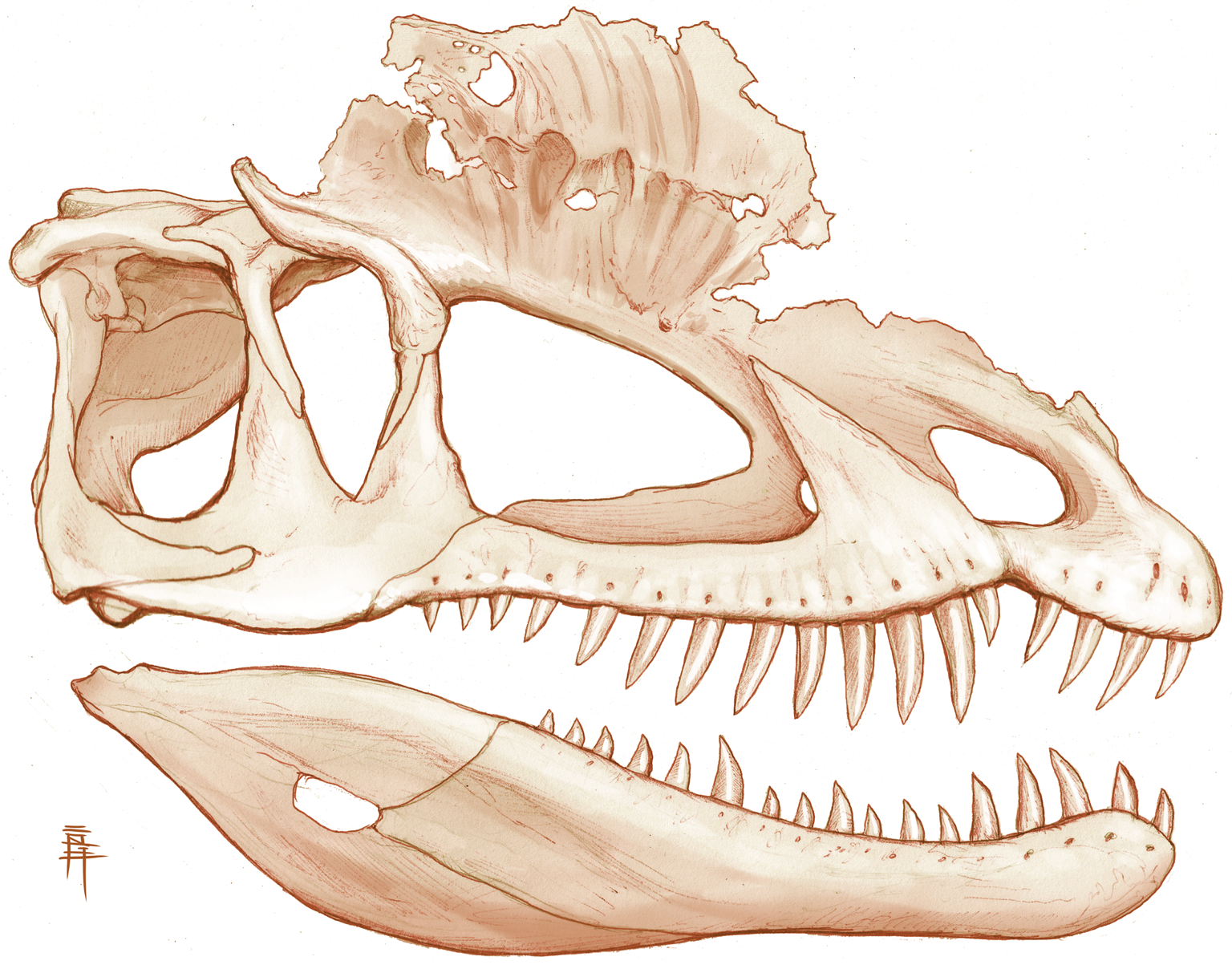
Reconstruction of the skull showing preserved extent of the crests

The skull of Dilophosaurus was large in proportion to the overall skeleton. The snout was narrow in front view, becoming narrower towards the rounded top. The premaxilla (front bone of the upper jaw) was long and low when seen from the side, bulbous at the front, and its outer surface became less convex from snout to naris (bony nostril). The nostrils were placed further back than in most other theropods. The premaxillae were in close articulation with each other, and while the premaxilla only connected to the maxilla (the following bone of the upper jaw) at the middle of the palate, with no connection at the side, they formed a strong joint through the robust, interlocking articulation between the hindwards and forwards directed processes of these bones. Hindwards and below, the premaxilla formed a wall for a gap between itself and the maxilla called the subnarial gap (also termed a "kink"). Such a gap is also present in coelophysoids, as well as other dinosaurs. The subnarial gap resulted in a diastema, a gap in the tooth row (which has also been called a "notch"). Within the subnarial gap was a deep excavation behind the toothrow of the premaxilla, called the subnarial pit, which was walled by a downwards keel of the premaxilla.

The outer surface of the premaxilla was covered in foramina (openings) of varying sizes. The upper of the two backward-extending processes of the premaxilla was long and low, and formed most of the upper border of the elongated naris. It had a dip towards the font, which made the area by its base concave in profile. The underside of the premaxilla containing the alveoli (tooth sockets) was oval. The maxilla was shallow, and was depressed around the antorbital fenestra (a large opening in front of the eye), forming a recess that was rounded towards the front, and smoother than the rest of the maxilla. A foramen called the preanteorbital fenestra opened into this recess at the front bend. Large foramina ran on the side of the maxilla, above the alveoli. A deep nutrient groove ran backward from the subnarial pit along the base of the interdental plates (or rugosae) of the maxilla.

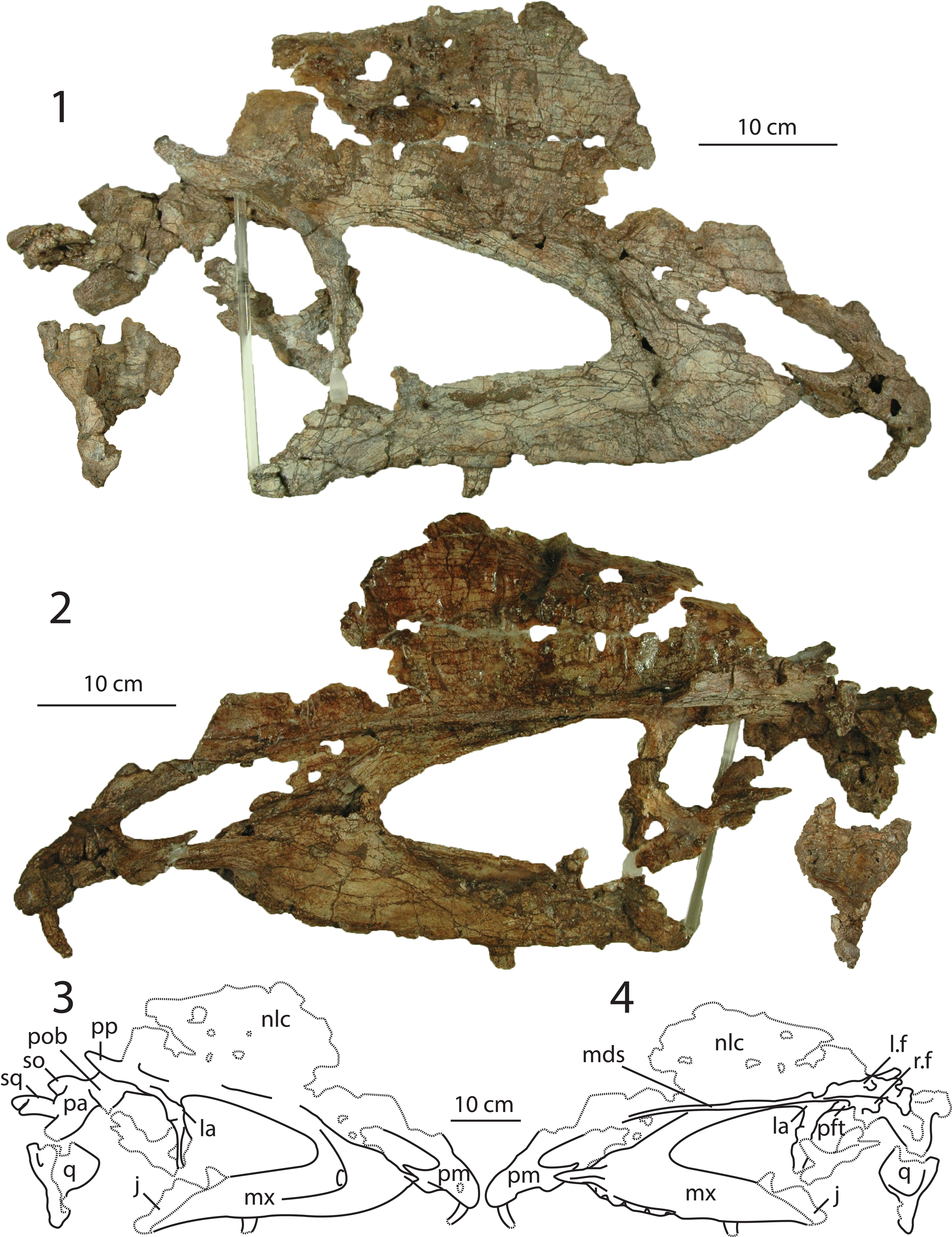
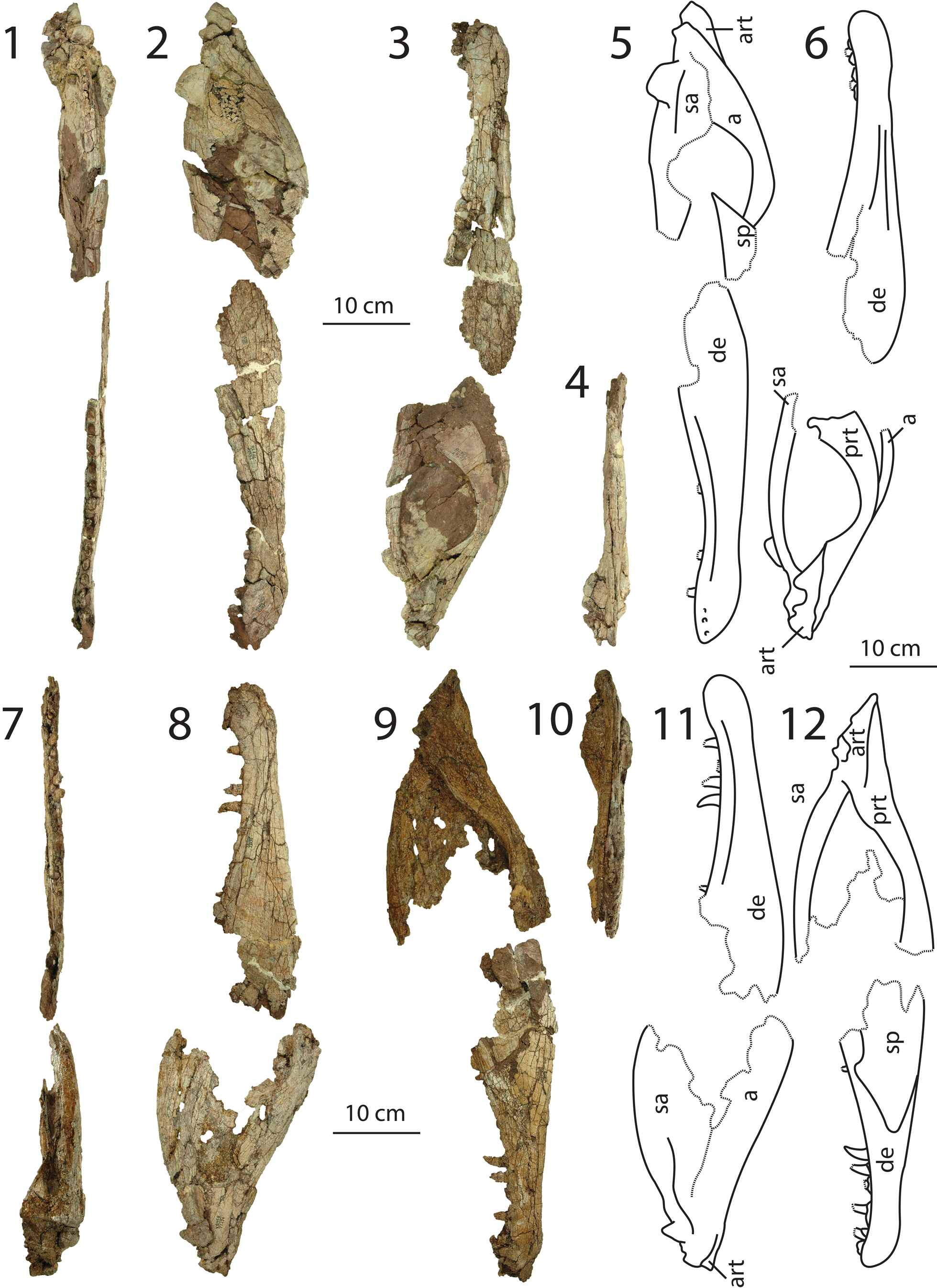
Skull (left), mandible (middle), and braincase (right) of assigned specimen UCMP 77270

Dilophosaurus bore a pair of high, thin, and arched (or plate-shaped) crests longitudinally on the skull roof. The crests (termed the nasolacrimal crests) began as low ridges on the premaxillae and were mainly formed by the upwards expanded nasal and lacrimal bones. These bones were coossified together (fusion during bone tissue formation), so the sutures between them cannot be determined. The lacrimal bone expanded into a thick, rugose preorbital boss, forming an arc at the upper front border of the orbit (eye socket), and supported the bottom of the back of the crest. Uniquely for this genus, the rim above the orbit continued hindwards and ended in a small, almost triangular process behind the orbit, which curved slightly outwards. Since only a short part of the upper surface of this process is unbroken, the rest of the crest may have risen above the skull over a distance of ~12 millimeters (0.47 in). The preserved part of the crest in UCMP 77270 is tallest around the midpoint of the antorbital fenestra's length. UCMP 77270 preserves the concave shelf between the bases of the crests, and when seen from the front, they are projected upwards and to the sides at an ~80° angle. Welles found the crests reminiscent of a double-crested cassowary, while Marsh and Rowe stated they were probably covered in keratin or keratinized skin. They pointed out that by comparison with helmeted guineafowl, the keratin on the crests of Dilophosaurus could have enlarged them much more than what is indicated by the bone. As only one specimen preserves much of the crests, whether they differed between individuals is unknown. CT scans show that air sacs (pockets of air that provide strength for and lighten bones) were present in the bones that surrounded the brain, and were continuous with the sinus cavities in the front of the skull. The antorbital fenestra was continuous with the side of the crests, which indicates the crests also had air sacs (a ridge of bone forms a roof over the antorbital fenestrae in most other theropods).

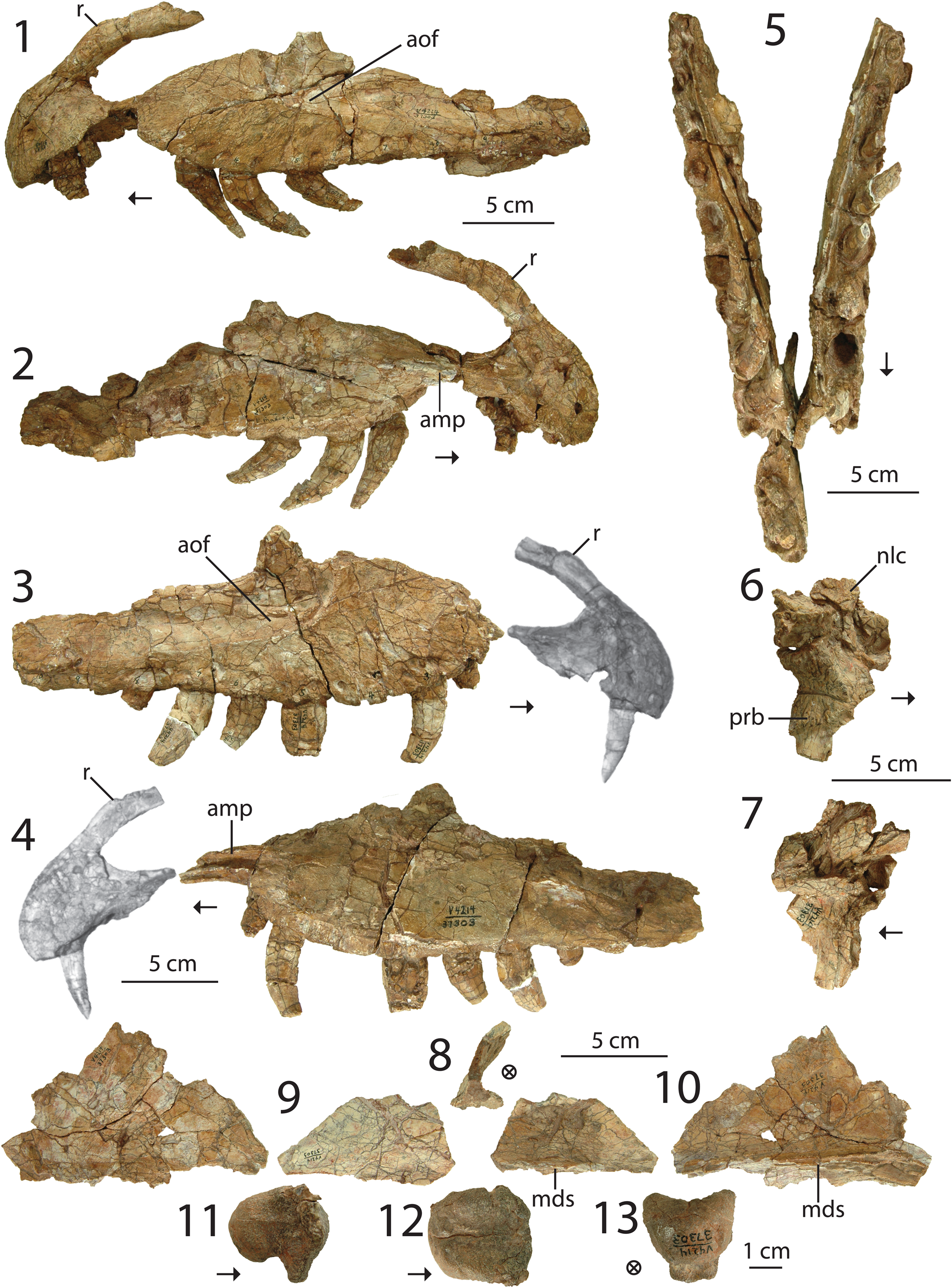
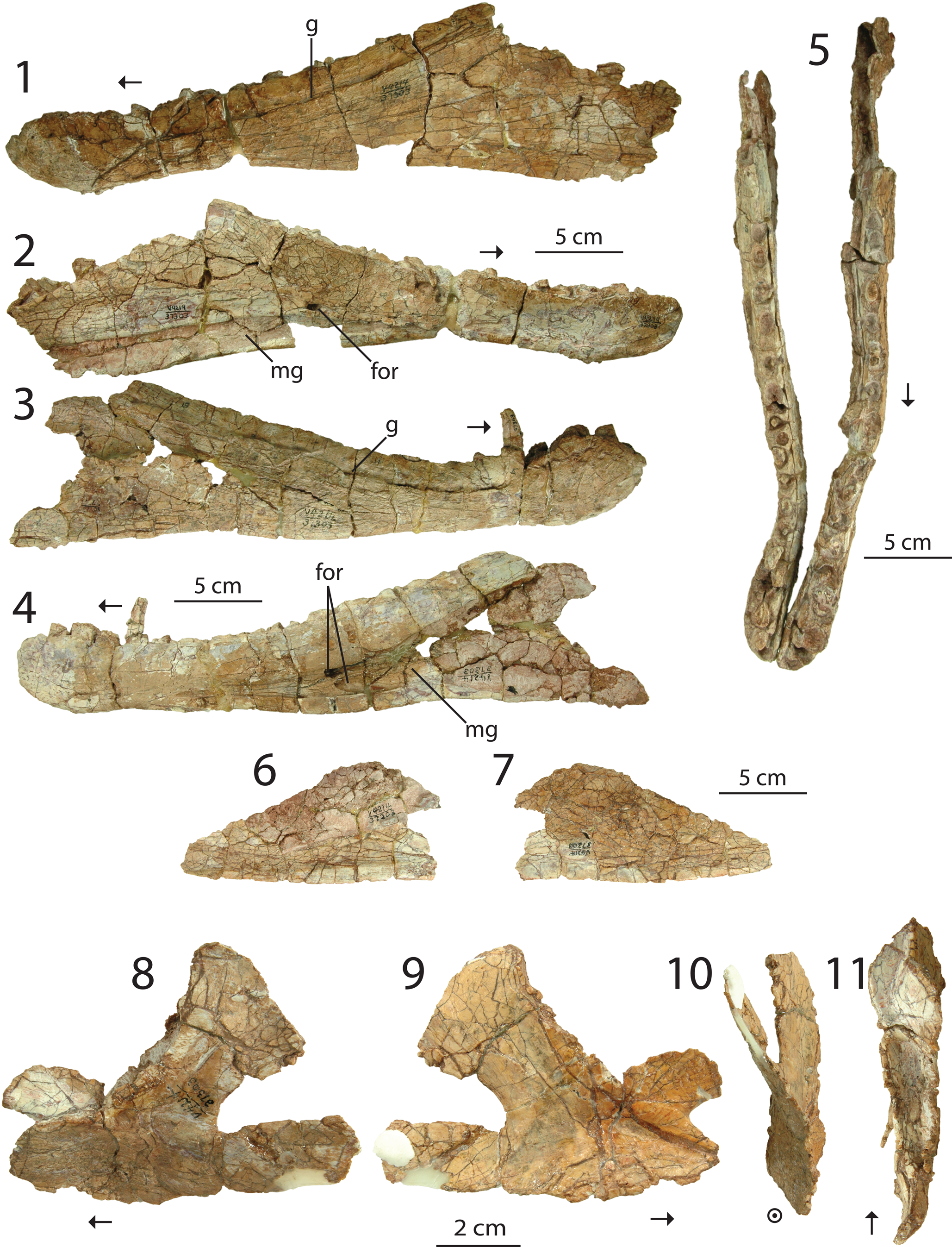
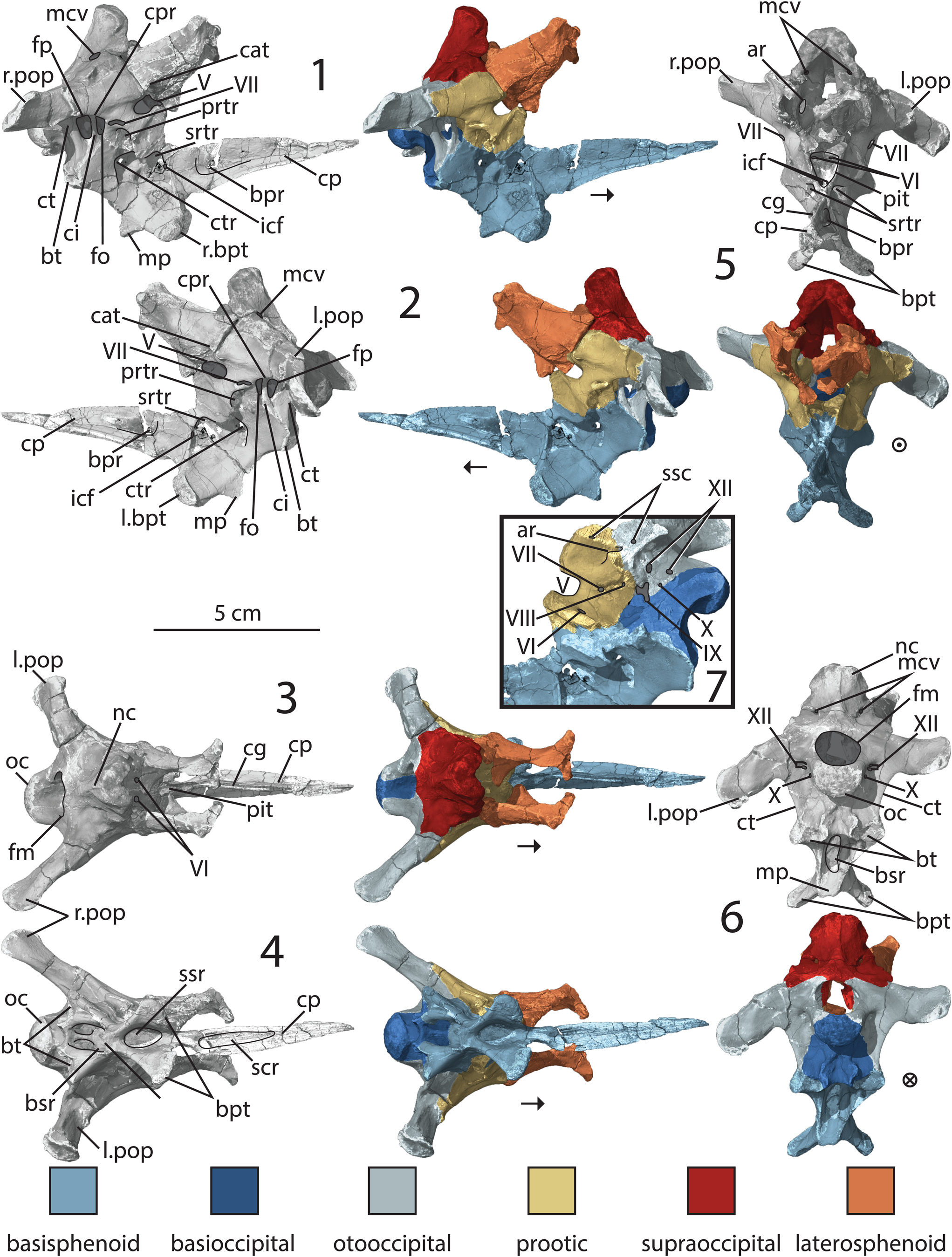
Upper jaw and crest pieces (left) and mandible (middle) of paratype specimen UCMP 37303, and braincase CT scans (right) of assigned specimen TMM 47006-1

The orbit was oval, and narrow towards the bottom. The jugal bone had two upwards-pointing processes, the first of which formed part of the lower margin of the antorbital fenestra, and part of the lower margin of the orbit. A projection from the quadrate bone into the lateral temporal fenestra (opening behind the eye) gave this a reniform (kidney-shaped) outline. The foramen magnum (the large opening at the back of the braincase) was about half the breadth of the occipital condyle, which was itself cordiform (heart-shaped), and had a short neck and a groove on the side. The mandible was slender at the front, but the articular region (where it connected with the skull) was massive, and the mandible was deep around the mandibular fenestra (an opening on its side). The mandibular fenestra was small in Dilophosaurus, compared to that of coelophysoids, and reduced from front to back, uniquely for this genus. The dentary bone (the front part of the mandible where most of the teeth there were attached) had an up-curved rather than pointed chin. The chin had a large foramen at the tip, and a row of small foramina ran in rough parallel with the upper edge of the dentary. On the inner side, the mandibular symphysis (where the two halves of the lower jaw connected) was flat and smooth, and showed no sign of being fused with its opposite half. A Meckelian foramen ran along the outer side of the dentary. The side surface of the surangular bone had a unique pyramidal process in front of the articulation with the quadrate, and this horizontal ridge formed a shelf. The retroarticular process of the mandible (a backwards projection) was long.

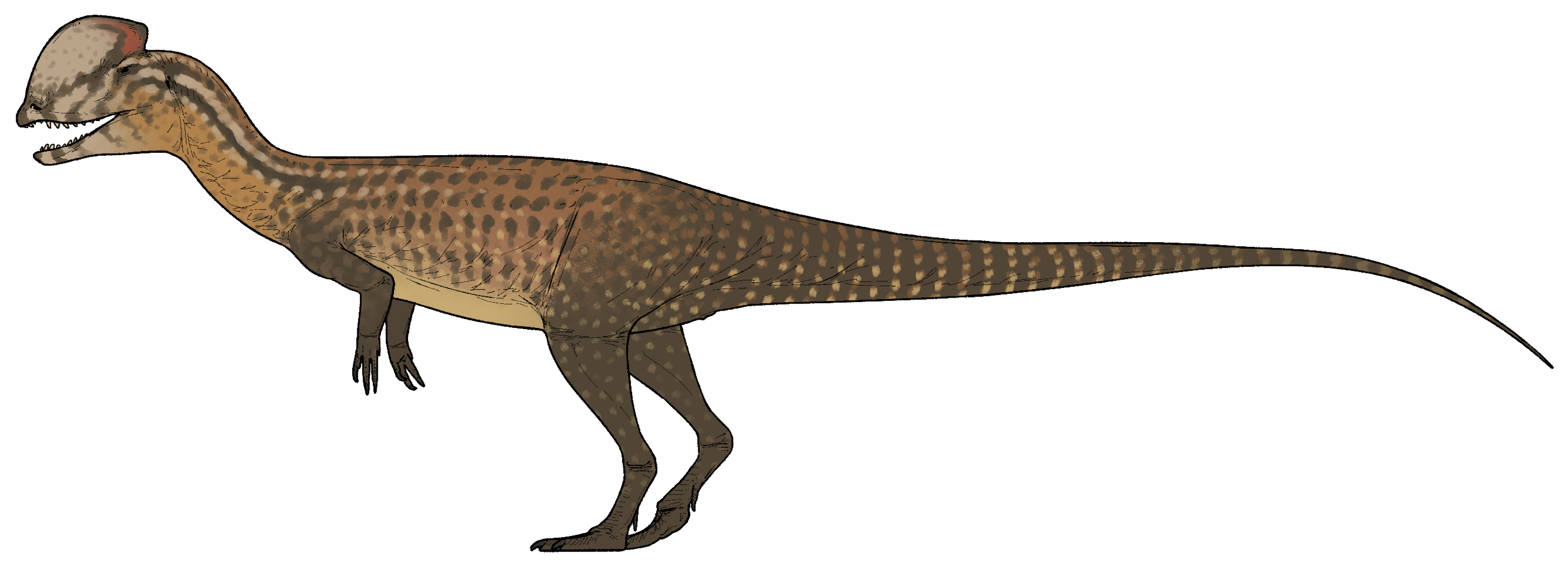
Hypothetical life restoration.

Dilophosaurus had four teeth in each premaxilla, 12 in each maxilla, and 17 in each dentary. The teeth were generally long, thin, and recurved, with relatively small bases. They were compressed sideways, oval in cross-section at the base, lenticular (lens-shaped) above, and slightly concave on their outer and inner sides. The largest tooth of the maxilla was either in or near the fourth alveolus, and the height of the tooth crowns decreased hindwards. The first tooth of the maxilla pointed slightly forwards from its alveolus because the lower border of the premaxilla process (which projected backward towards the maxilla) was upturned. The teeth of the dentary were much smaller than those of the maxilla. The third or fourth tooth in the dentary of Dilophosaurus and some coelophysoids was the largest there, and seems to have fit into the subnarial gap of the upper jaw. Most of the teeth had serrations on the front and back edges, which were offset by vertical grooves, and were smaller at the front. About 31 to 41 serrations were on the front edges, and 29 to 33 were on the back. At least the second and third teeth of the premaxilla had serrations, but the fourth tooth did not. The teeth were covered in a thin layer of enamel, 0.1 to 0.15 mm (0.0039 to 0.0059 in) thick, which extended far towards their bases. The alveoli were elliptical to almost circular, and all were larger than the bases of the teeth they contained, which may therefore have been loosely held in the jaws. Though the number of alveoli in the dentary would seem to indicate that the teeth were very crowded, they were rather far apart, due to the larger size of their alveoli. The jaws contained replacement teeth at various stages of eruption. The interdental plates between the teeth were very low.

=== Postcranial skeleton ===
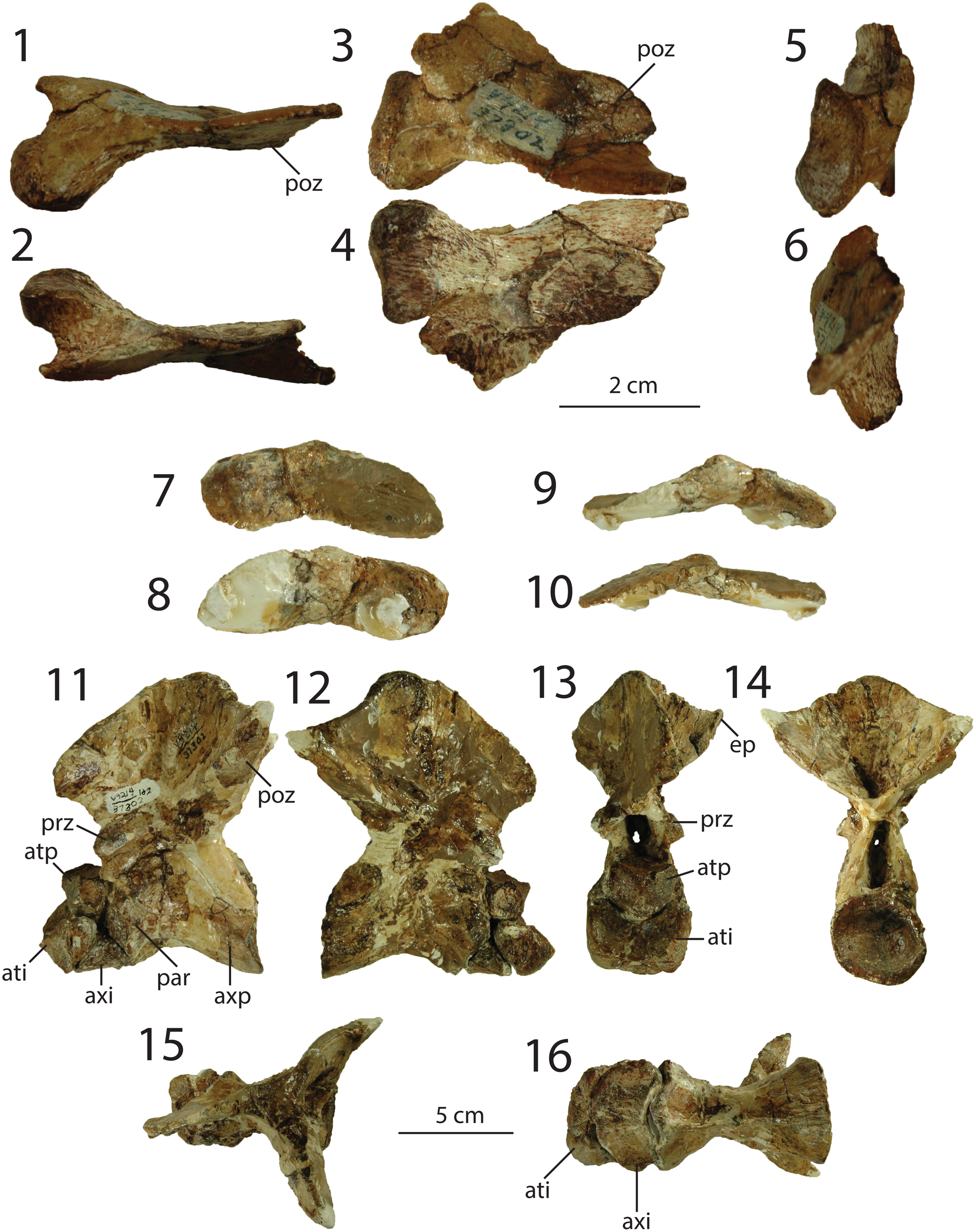
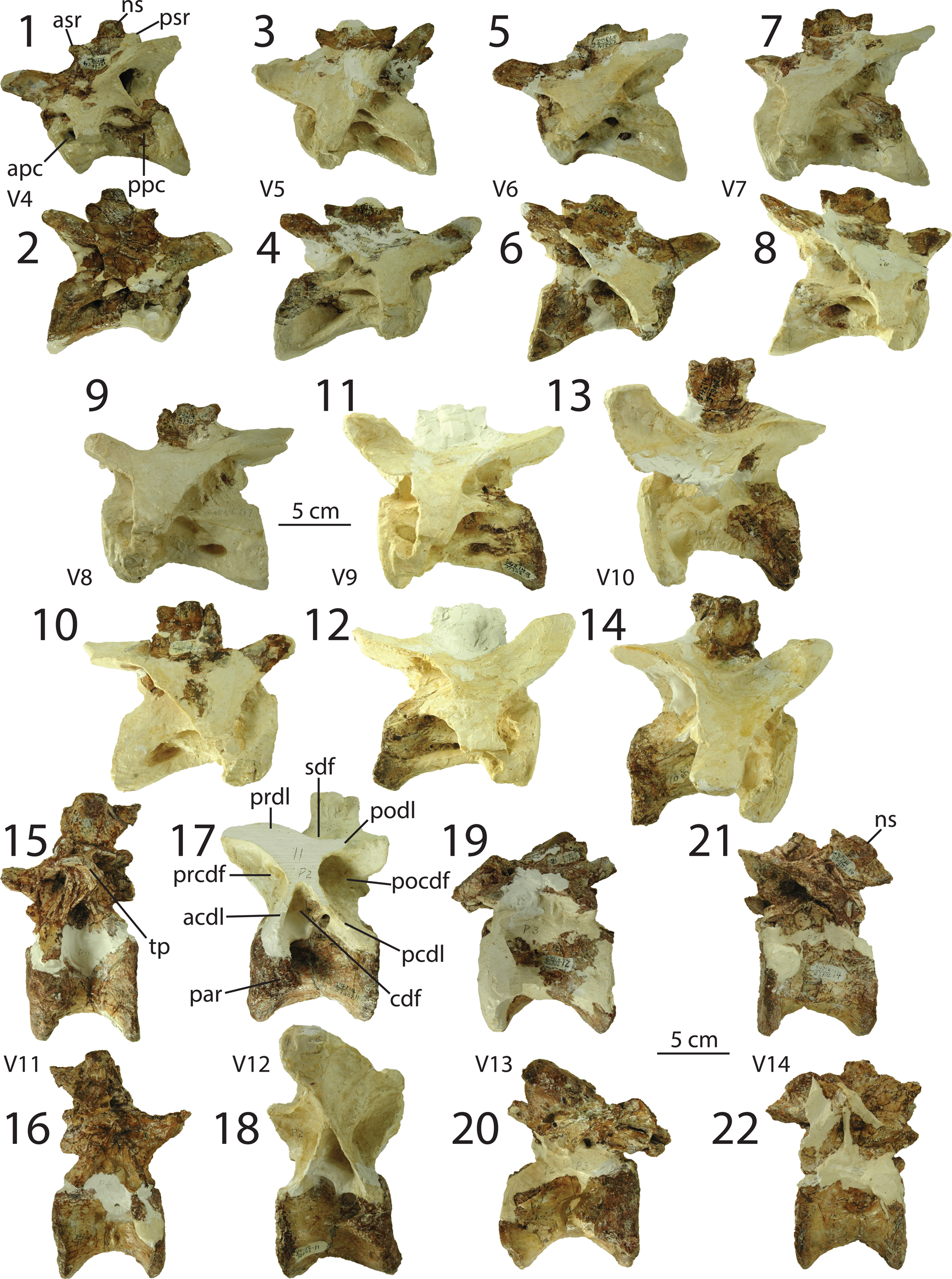
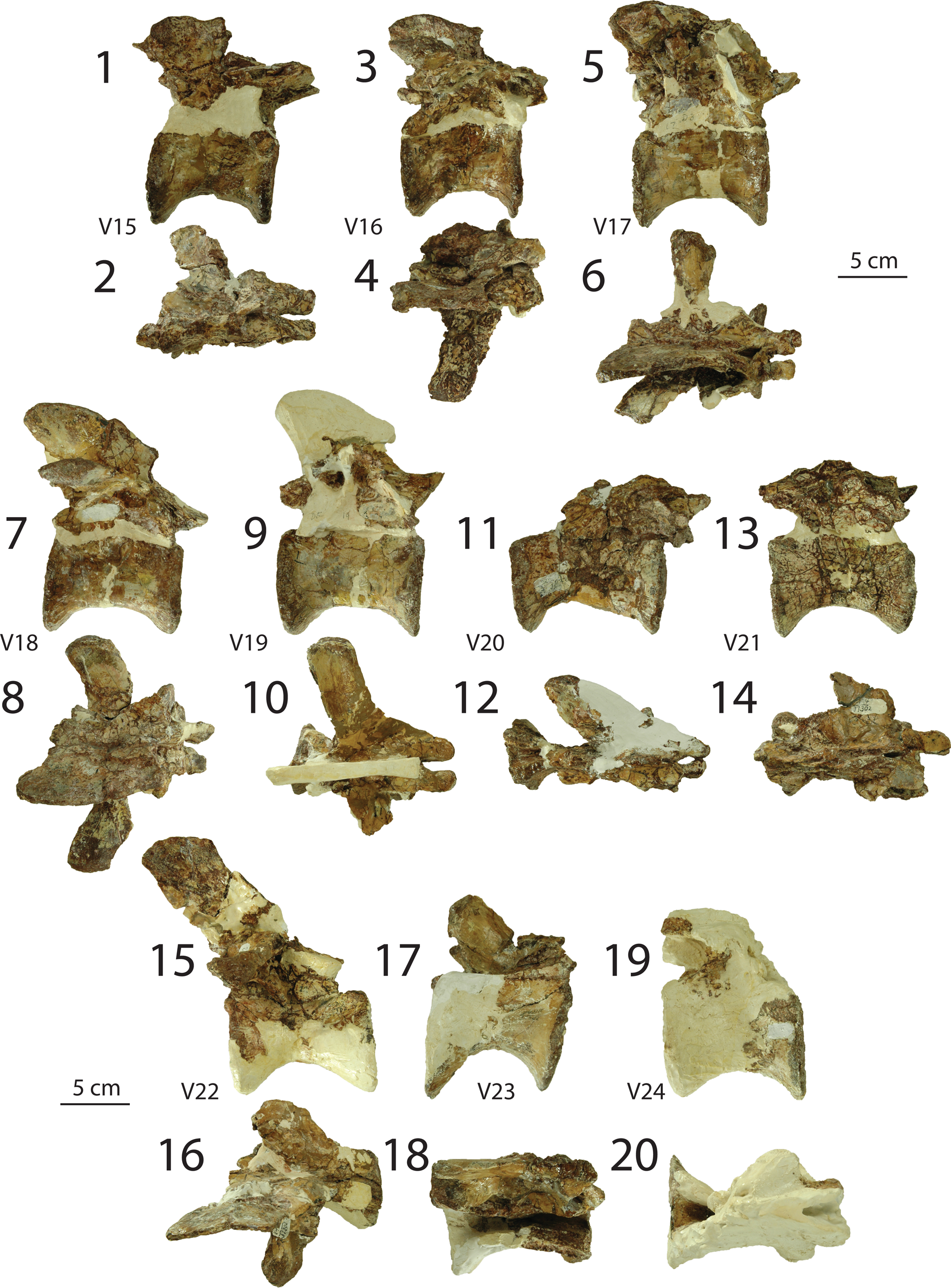
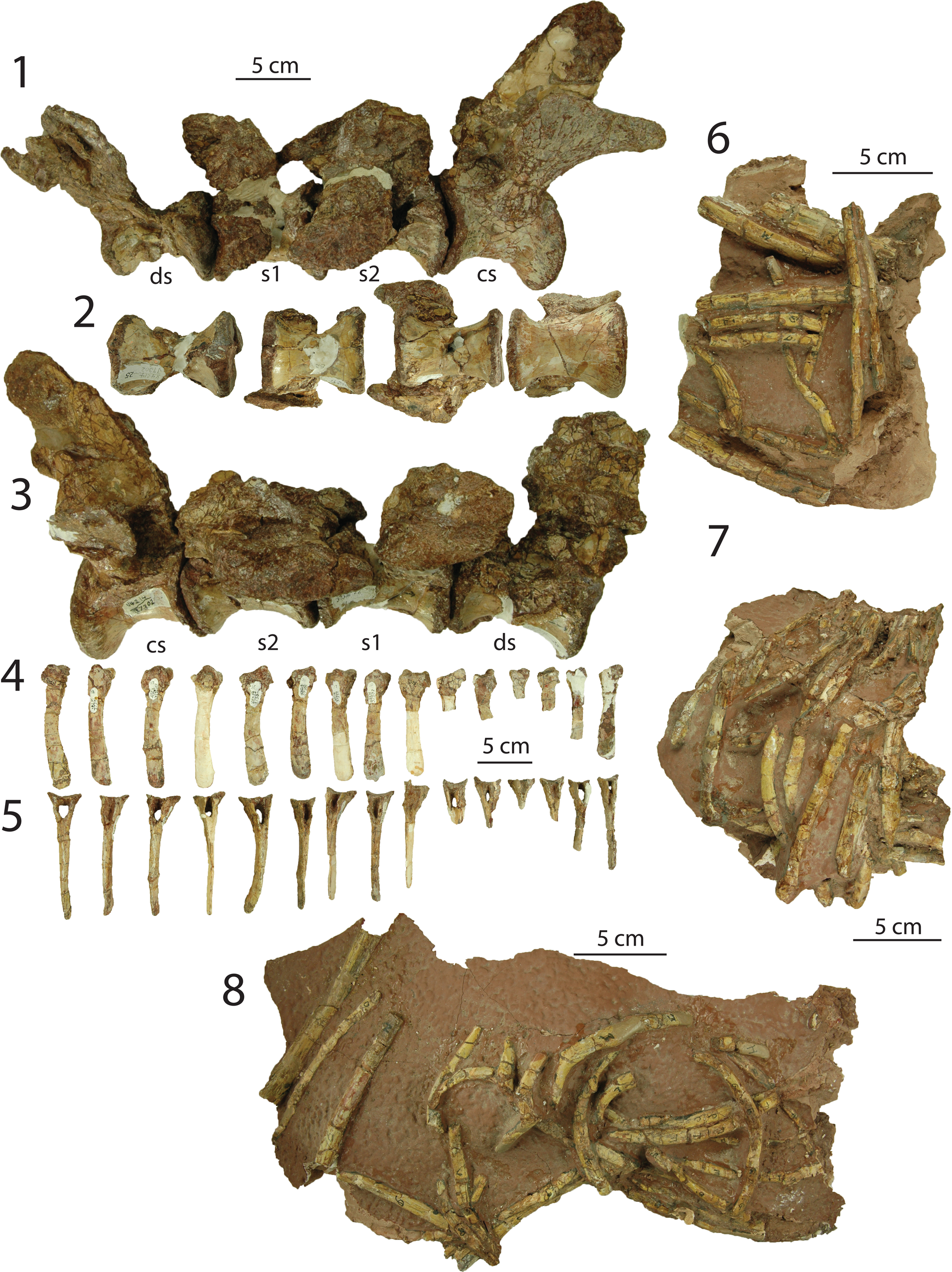
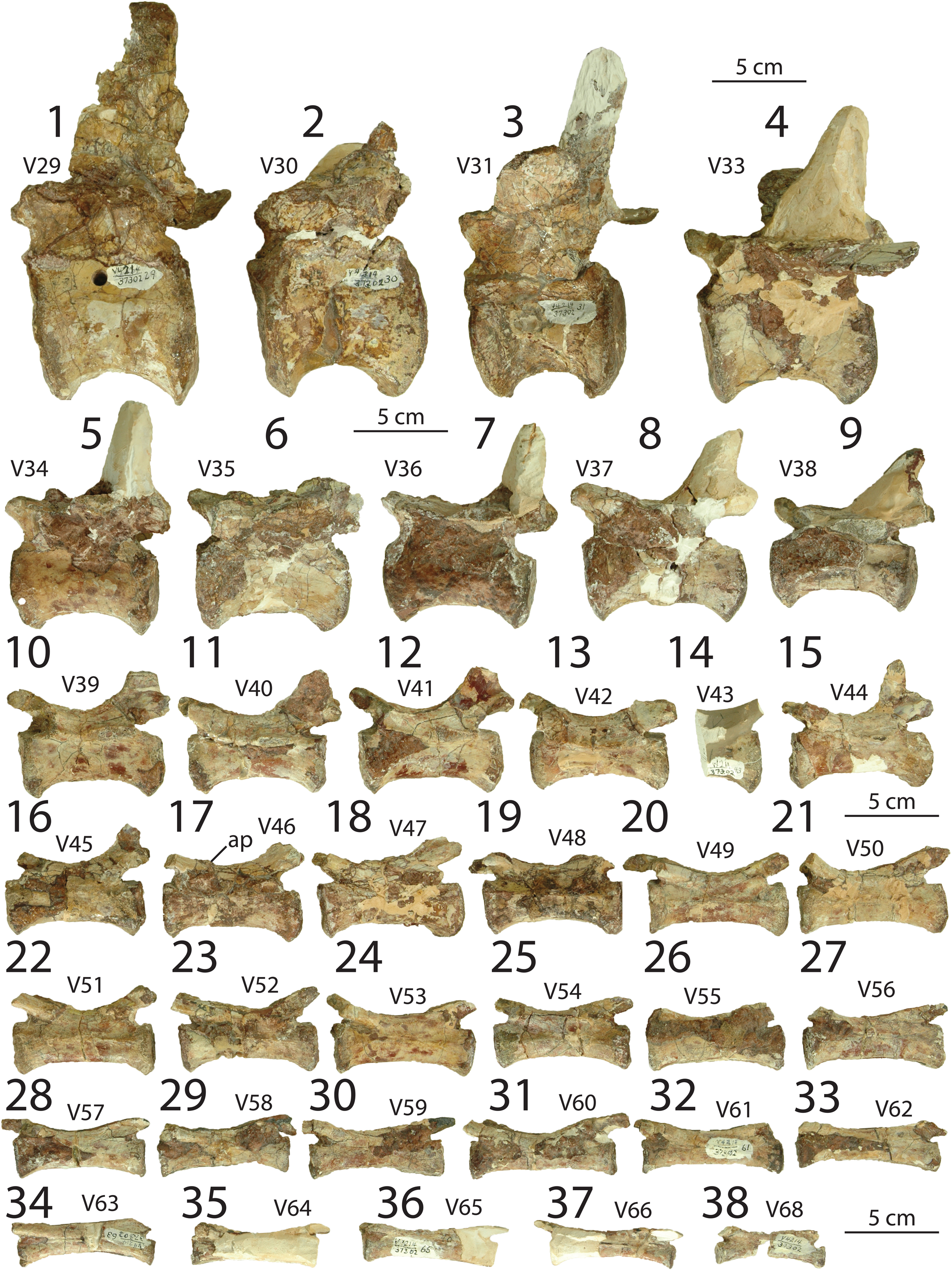
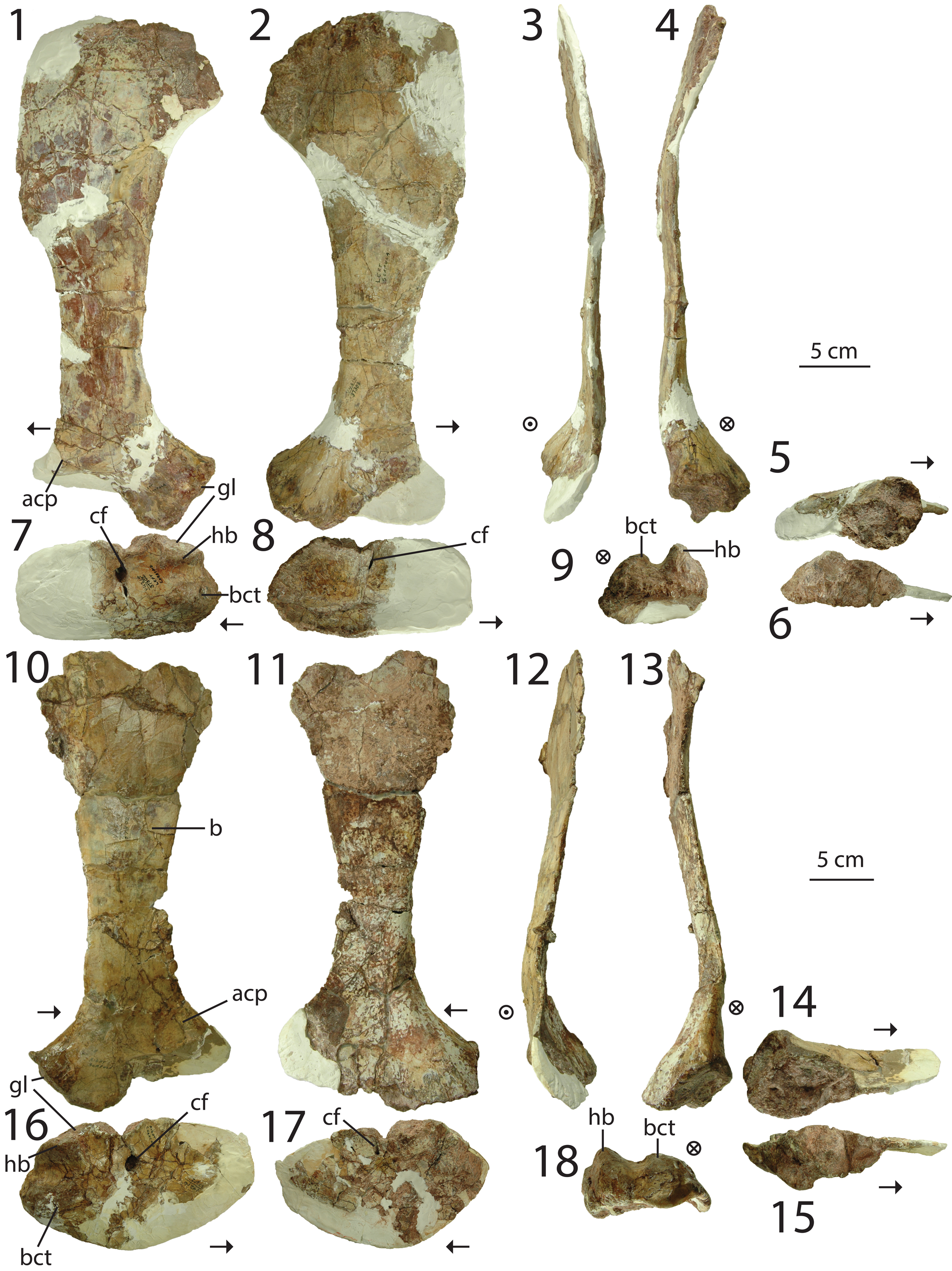
Axis, atlas (upper left), cervical (upper middle), trunk (upper right), sacral (lower left), and caudal (lower middle) vertebrae, and pectoral girdle of the holotype

Dilophosaurus had 10 cervical (neck), 14 dorsal (back), and 45 caudal (tail) vertebrae, and air sacs grew into the vertebrae. It had a long neck, which was probably flexed nearly 90° by the skull and by the shoulder, holding the skull in a horizontal posture. The cervical vertebrae were unusually light; their centra (the "bodies" of the vertebrae) were hollowed out by pleurocoels (depressions on the sides) and centrocoels (cavities on the inside). The arches of the cervical vertebrae also had pneumatic fossae (or chonoses), conical recesses so large that the bones separating them were sometimes paper-thin. The centra were plano-concave, flat to weakly convex at the front and deeply cupped (or concave) at the back, similar to Ceratosaurus. This indicates that the neck was flexible, though it had long, overlapping cervical ribs, which were fused to the centra. The cervical ribs were slender and may have bent easily.

The atlas bone (the first cervical vertebra which attaches to the skull) had a small, cubic centrum, and had a concavity at the front where it formed a cup for the occipital condyle (protuberance that connects with the atlas vertebra) at the back of the skull. The axis bone (the second cervical vertebra) had a heavy spine, and its postzygapophyses (the processes of the vertebrae that articulated with the prezygapophyses of a following vertebrae) were met by long prezygapophyses that curved upwards from the third cervical vertebra. The centra and neural spines of the cervical vertebrae were long and low, and the spines were stepped in side view, forming "shoulders" at the front and back, as well as taller, central "caps" that gave the appearance of a Maltese cross (cruciform) when seen from above, distinctive features of this dinosaur. The posterior centrodiapophyseal lamina of the cervicals showed serial variation, bifurcating and reuniting down the neck, a unique feature. The neural spines of the dorsal vertebrae were also low and expanded front and back, which formed strong attachments for ligaments. Uniquely for this genus, additional laminae emanated from the middle trunk vertebrae's anterior centrodiapophyseal laminae and posterior centrodiapophyseal laminae. The sacral vertebrae which occupied the length of the ilium blade did not appear to be fused. The rib of the first sacral vertebra articulated with the preacetabular process of the ilium, a distinct feature. The centra of the caudal vertebrae were very consistent in length, but their diameter became smaller towards the back, and they went from elliptical to circular in cross-section.

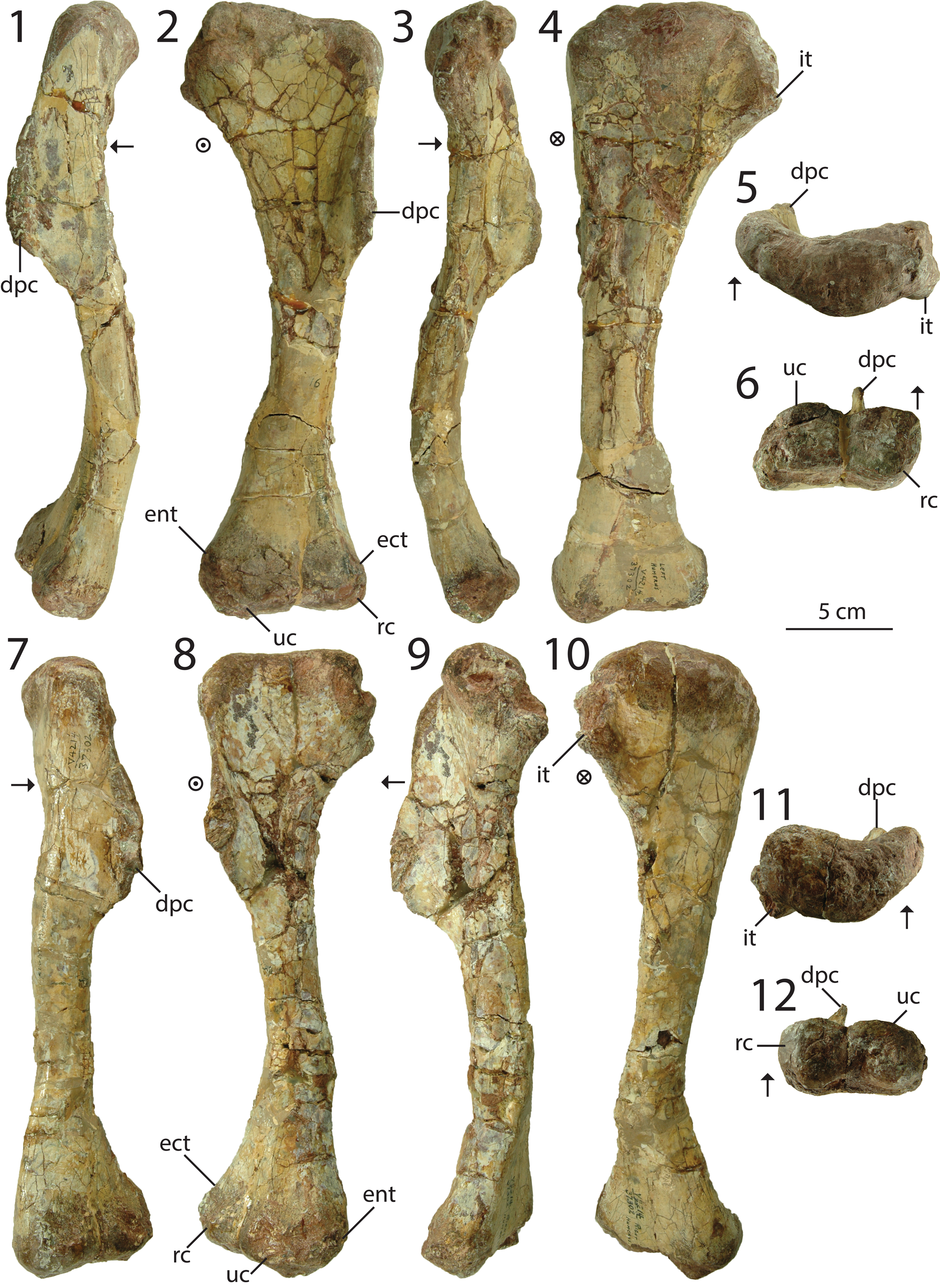
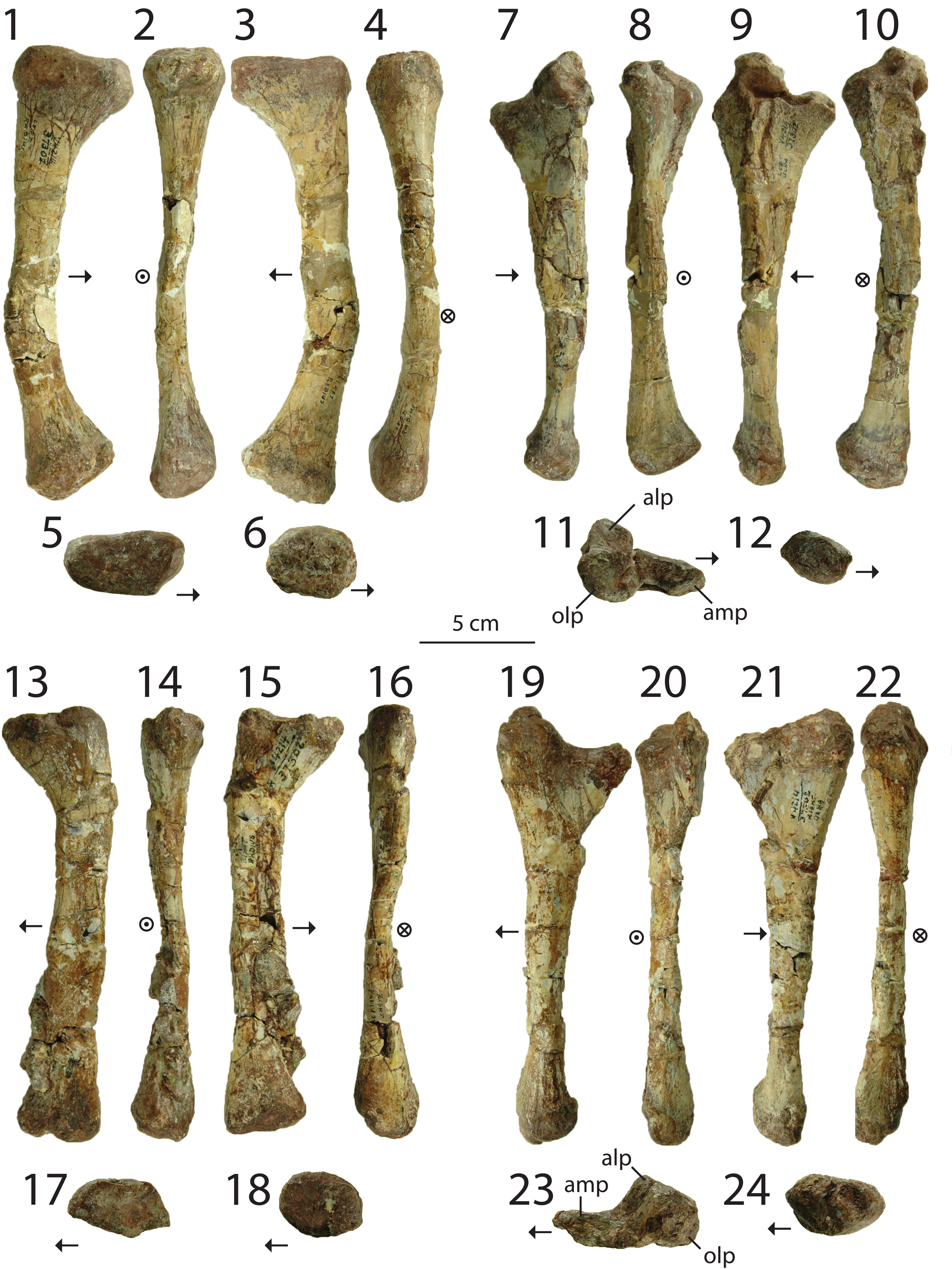
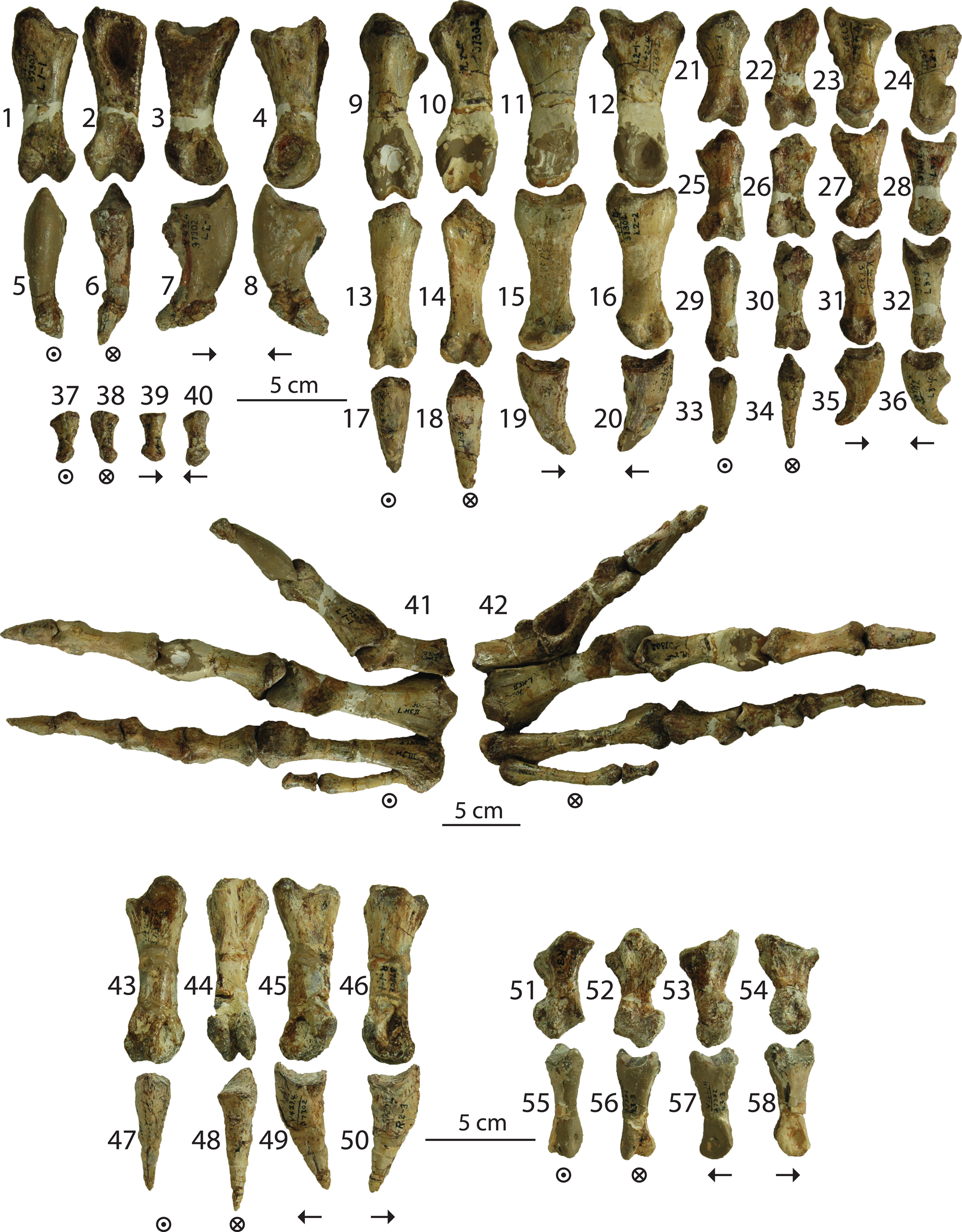
Humeri (upper left), radii and ulnae (upper middle) hand bones (upper right), pelvic bones (lower left), femora (lower middle), and toe bones (lower right) of the holotype

The scapulae (shoulder blades) were moderate in length and concave on their inner sides to follow the body's curvature. The scapulae were wide, particularly the upper part, which was rectangular (or squared off), a unique feature. The coracoids were elliptical, and not fused to the scapulae. The lower hind portions of the coracoids had a "horizontal buttress" next to the biceps tuber, unique for this genus. The arms were powerful, and had deep pits and stout processes for attachment of muscles and ligaments. The humerus (upper arm bone) was large and slender, and the ulna (lower arm bone) was stout and straight, with a stout olecranon. The hands had four fingers: the first was shorter but stronger than the following two fingers, with a large claw, and the two following fingers were longer and slenderer, with smaller claws. The claws were curved and sharp. The third finger was reduced, and the fourth was vestigial (retained, but without function).

The crest of the ilium was highest over the ilial peduncle (the downwards process of the ilium), and its outer side was concave. The foot of the pubic bone was only slightly expanded, whereas the lower end was much more expanded on the ischium, which also had a very thin shaft. The hind legs were large, with a slighter longer femur (thigh bone) than tibia (lower leg bone), the opposite of, for example, Coelophysis. The femur was massive; its shaft was sigmoid-shaped (curved like an 'S'), and its greater trochanter was centered on the shaft. The tibia had a developed tuberosity and was expanded at the lower end. The astragalus bone (ankle bone) was separated from the tibia and the calcaneum, and formed half of the socket for the fibula. It had long, stout feet with three well-developed toes that bore large claws, which were much less curved than those of the hand. The third toe was the stoutest, and the smaller first toe (the hallux) was kept off the ground.

== Classification ==
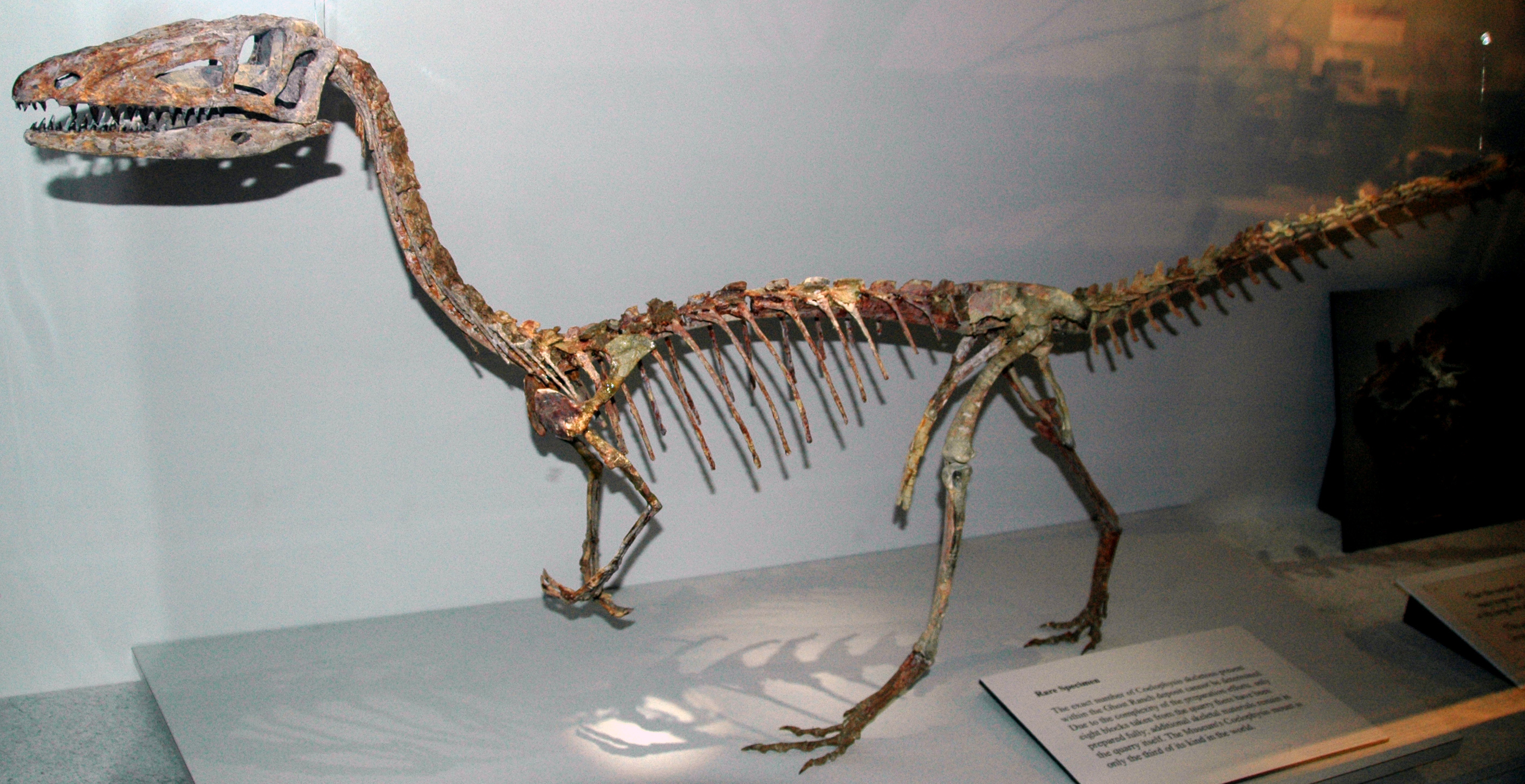
Mounted skeleton of Coelophysis, which Dilophosaurus was earlier grouped with

Welles thought Dilophosaurus a megalosaur in 1954, but revised his opinion in 1970 after discovering that it had crests. By 1974, Welles and the paleontologist Robert A. Long found Dilophosaurus to be a ceratosauroid. In 1984 Welles found that Dilophosaurus exhibited features of both Coelurosauria and Carnosauria, the two main groups into which theropods had hitherto been divided, based on body size, and he suggested this division was inaccurate. He found Dilophosaurus to be closest to those theropods that were usually placed in the family Halticosauridae, particularly Liliensternus.

In 1988, paleontologist Gregory S. Paul classified the halticosaurs as a subfamily of the family Coelophysidae, and suggested that Dilophosaurus could have been a direct descendant of Coelophysis. Paul also considered the possibility that spinosaurs were late-surviving dilophosaurs, based on similarity of the kinked snout, nostril position, and slender teeth of Baryonyx. In 1994, paleontologist Thomas R. Holtz placed Dilophosaurus in the group Coelophysoidea, along with but separate from the Coelophysidae. He placed the Coelophysoidea in the group Ceratosauria. In 2000, paleontologist James H. Madsen and Welles divided Ceratosauria into the families Ceratosauridae and Dilophosauridae, with Dilophosaurus as the sole member of the latter family.

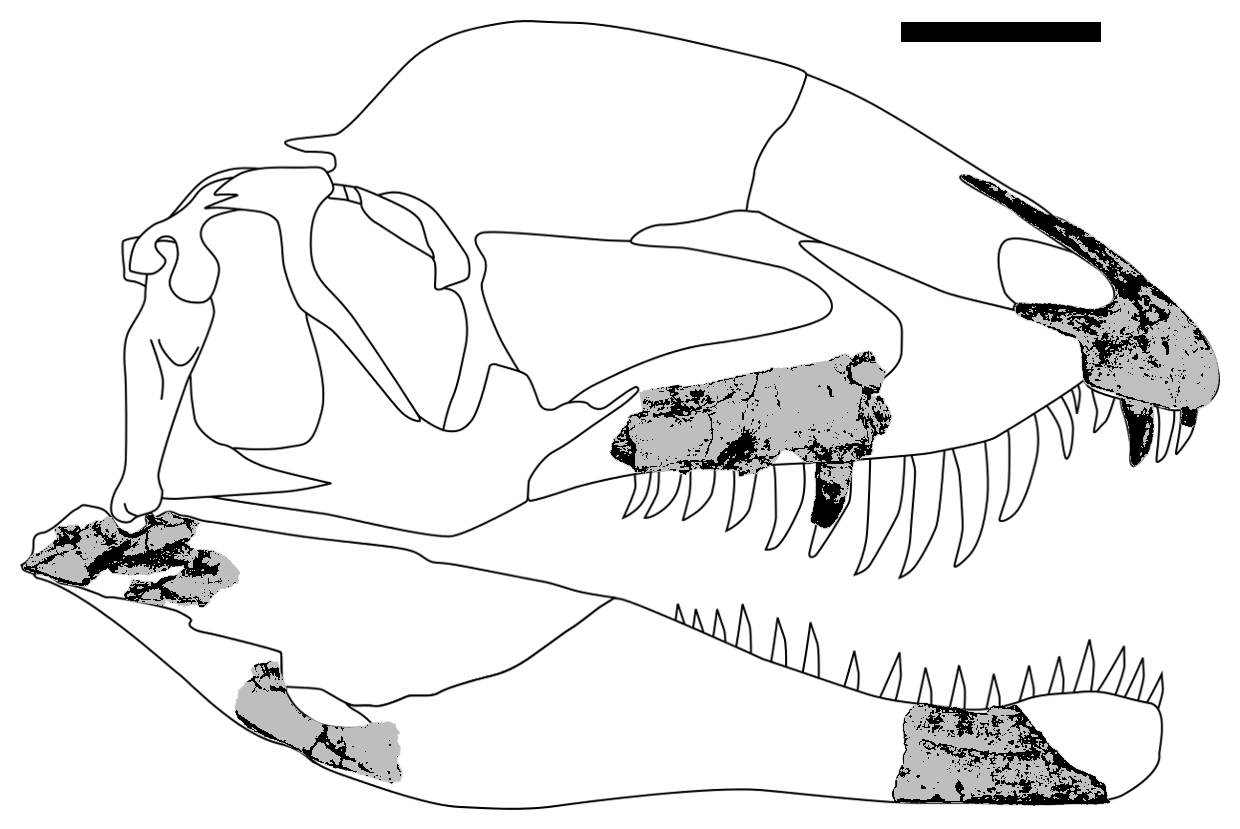
Known skull bones of Dracovenator, which has been proposed as a close relative of Dilophosaurus (onto whose skull the bones are arranged here)

Lamanna and colleagues pointed out in 1998 that since Dilophosaurus was discovered to have had crests on its skull, other similarly crested theropods have been discovered (including Sinosaurus), and that this feature is, therefore, not unique to the genus, and of limited use for determining interrelationships within their group. Paleontologist Adam M. Yates described the genus Dracovenator from South Africa in 2005, and found it closely related to Dilophosaurus and Zupaysaurus. His cladistic analysis suggested they did not belong in the Coelophysoidea, but rather in the Neotheropoda, a more derived (or "advanced") group. He proposed that if Dilophosaurus was more derived than the Coelophysoidea, the features it shared with this group may have been inherited from basal (or "primitive") theropods, indicating that theropods may have passed through a "coelophysoid stage" in their early evolution.

In 2007, paleontologist Nathan D. Smith and colleagues found the crested theropod Cryolophosaurus to be the sister species of Dilophosaurus, and grouped them with Dracovenator and Sinosaurus. This clade was more derived than the Coelophysoidea, but more basal than the Ceratosauria, thereby placing basal theropods in a ladder-like arrangement. In 2012, Carrano and colleagues found that the group of crested theropods proposed by Smith and colleagues was based on features that relate to the presence of such crests, but that the features of the rest of the skeleton were less consistent. They instead found that Dilophosaurus was a coelophysoid, with Cryolophosaurus and Sinosaurus being more derived, as basal members of the group Tetanurae.

Reconstructed skeleton of the crested Cryolophosaurus, sometimes considered a close relative of Dilophosaurus

Paleontologist Christophe Hendrickx and colleagues defined the Dilophosauridae to include Dilophosaurus and Dracovenator in 2015, and noted that while general uncertainty exists about the placement of this group, it appears to be slightly more derived than the Coelophysoidea, and the sister group to the Averostra. According to these researchers, the Dilophosauridae shared features with the Coelophysoidea such as the subnarial gap and the front teeth of the maxilla pointing forwards, while features shared with Averostra include a fenestra at the front of the maxilla and a reduced number of teeth in the maxilla. They suggested that the cranial crests of Cryolophosaurus and Sinosaurus had either evolved convergently, or were a feature inherited from a common ancestor.

In 2019, paleontologists Marion Zahner and Winand Brinkmann found the members of the Dilophosauridae to be successive basal sister taxa of the Averostra rather than a monophyletic clade (a natural group), but noted that some of their analyses did find the group valid, containing Dilophosaurus, Dracovenator, Cryolophosaurus, and possibly Notatesseraeraptor as the basal-most member. They therefore provided a diagnosis for the Dilophosauridae, based on features in the lower jaw. In the phylogenetic analysis accompanying their 2020 redescription, Marsh and Rowe found all specimens of Dilophosaurus to form a monophyletic group, sister to Averostra, and more derived than Cryolophosaurus. Their analysis did not find support for Dilophosauridae, and they suggested cranial crests were a plesiomorphic (ancestral) trait of Ceratosauria and Tetanurae.

The following cladogram shows the placement of Dilophosaurus within Theropoda according to a 2025 study by paleontologist Ricardo N. Martínez and colleagues:

- Theropoda
  - Eodromaeus murphi
  - - Anteavis crurilongus
    - - Lepidus praecisio
      - Neotheropoda
        - Coelophysoidea
          ⊞
          ⊟
          - Panguraptor lufengensis
          - - Lucianovenator bonoi
            - Pendraig milnerae
            - Powellvenator podocitus
            - - 'Syntarsus' kayentakatae
              - - Procompsognathus triassicus
                - - Coelophysis bauri
                  - - Camposaurus arizonensis
                    - Megapnosaurus rhodesiensis
                    - Segisaurus halli
        - - Dracoraptor hanigani
          - Liliensternus liliensterni
          - - Zupaysaurus rougieri
            - - Gojirasaurus quayi
              - - Cryolophosaurus ellioti
                - - Dilophosaurus wetherilli
                  - - Sarcosaurus woodi
                    - NMS.G.1994.10.1
                    - - Tachiraptor admirabilis
                      - Averostra
                        - - Allosaurus fragilis
                          - Piatnitzkysaurus floresi
                        - - Ceratosaurus nasicornis
                          - Eoabelisaurus mefi

== Ichnology ==
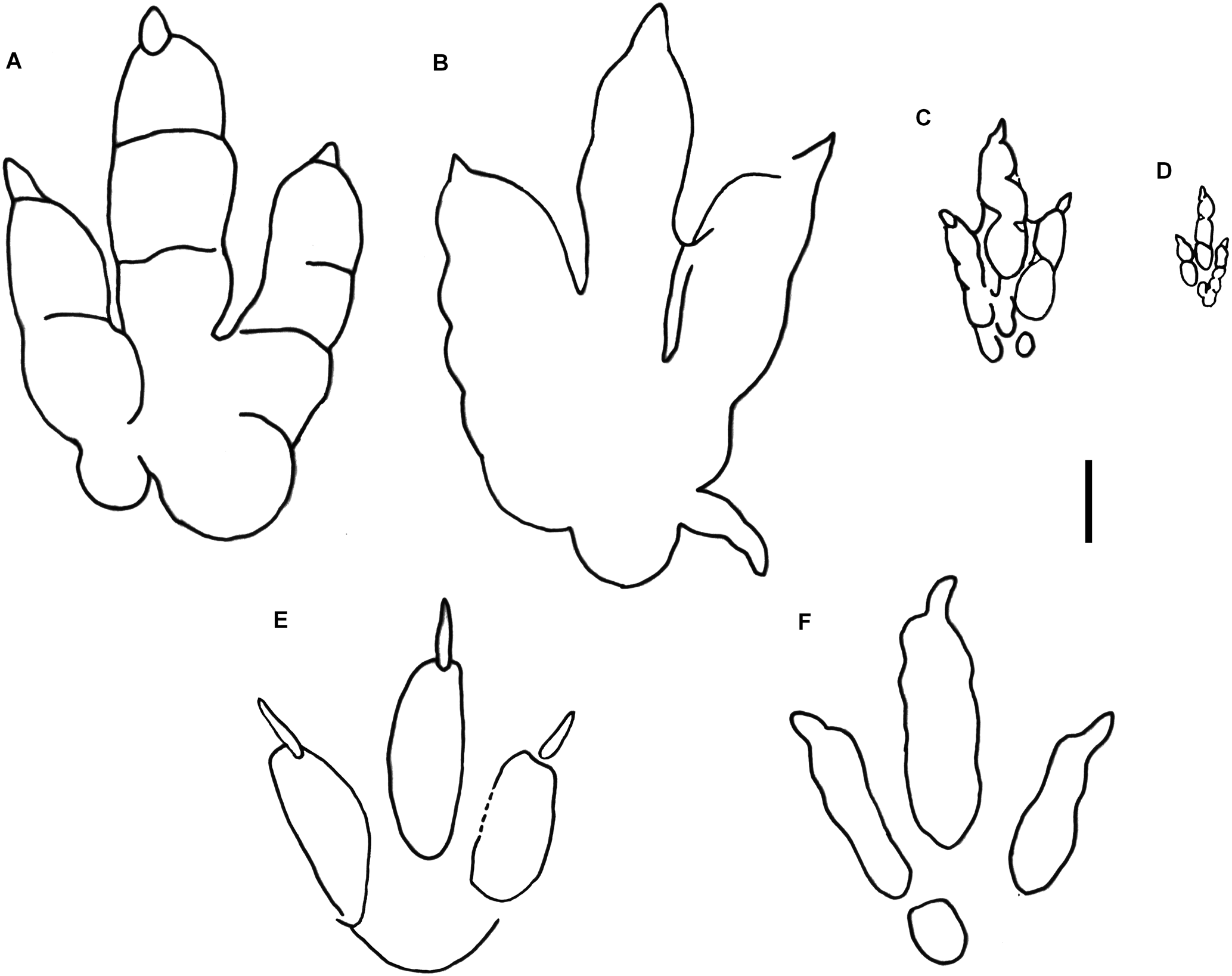
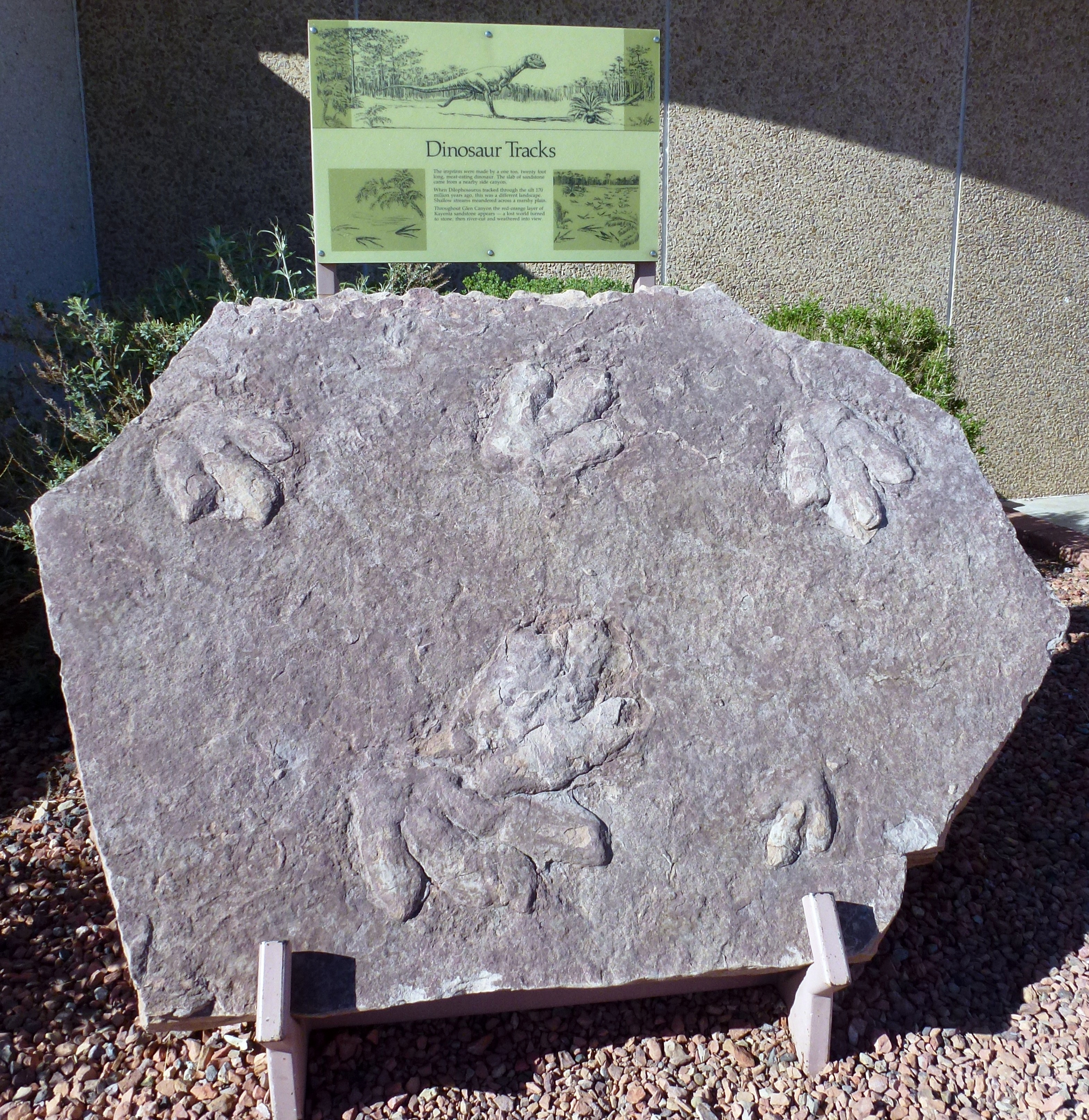
Diagrams of fossil tracks from the Late Triassic-Early Jurassic (left), several of which have been attributed to theropods similar to Dilophosaurus, including Eubrontes (A), Dilophosauripus (E), and Kayentapus (F), and tracks attributed to this genus in Glen Canyon National Recreation Area, Arizona (right)

Various ichnotaxa (taxa based on trace fossils) have been attributed to Dilophosaurus or similar theropods. In 1971, Welles reported dinosaur footprints from the Kayenta Formation of northern Arizona, on two levels 14 m (45 ft) and 112 m (367 ft) below where the original Dilophosaurus specimens were found. The lower footprints were tridactyl (three-toed), and could have been made by Dilophosaurus; Welles created the new ichnogenus and species Dilophosauripus williamsi based on them, in honor of Williams, the discoverer of the first Dilophosaurus skeletons. The type specimen is a cast of a large footprint catalogued as UCMP 79690-4, with casts of three other prints included in the hypodigm. In 1984, Welles conceded that no way had been found to prove or disprove that the footprints belonged to Dilophosaurus. In 1996, the paleontologists Michael Morales and Scott Bulkey reported a trackway of the ichnogenus Eubrontes from the Kayenta Formation made by a very large theropod. They noted it could have been made by a very large Dilophosaurus individual, but found that unlikely, as they estimated the trackmaker would have been 2.83–2.99 m (9 ft 3 1/2 in – 9 ft 9 3/4 in) tall at the hips, compared to the 1.50–1.75 m (4 ft 11 in – 5 ft 9 in) of Dilophosaurus.

The paleontologist Gerard Gierliński examined tridactyl footprints from the Holy Cross Mountains in Poland and concluded in 1991 that they belonged to a theropod like Dilophosaurus. He named the new ichnospecies Grallator (Eubrontes) soltykovensis based on them, with a cast of footprint MGIW 1560.11.12 as the holotype. In 1994 Gierliński also assigned footprints from the Höganäs Formation in Sweden discovered in 1974 to G. (E.) soltykovensis. In 1996, Gierliński attributed track AC 1/7 from the Turners Falls Formation of Massachusetts, a resting trace he believed to show feather impressions, to a theropod similar to Dilophosaurus and Liliensternus, and assigned it to the ichnotaxon Grallator minisculus. The paleontologist Martin Kundrát agreed that the track showed feather impressions in 2004, but this interpretation was disputed by the paleontologist Martin Lockley and colleagues in 2003 and the paleontologist Anthony J. Martin and colleagues in 2004, who considered them as sedimentological artifacts. Martin and colleagues also reassigned the track to the ichnotaxon Fulicopus lyellii. Gierliński and Karol Sabath responded at a conference talk in 2005, pointing out that the algae mat imprint would not only have been present on the stomach, but also the footprints. Based on detailed photos and experiments, they found the traces similar to those left by the fibrous feathers (semiplumes) of modern birds, and different from those left by a scaly body.

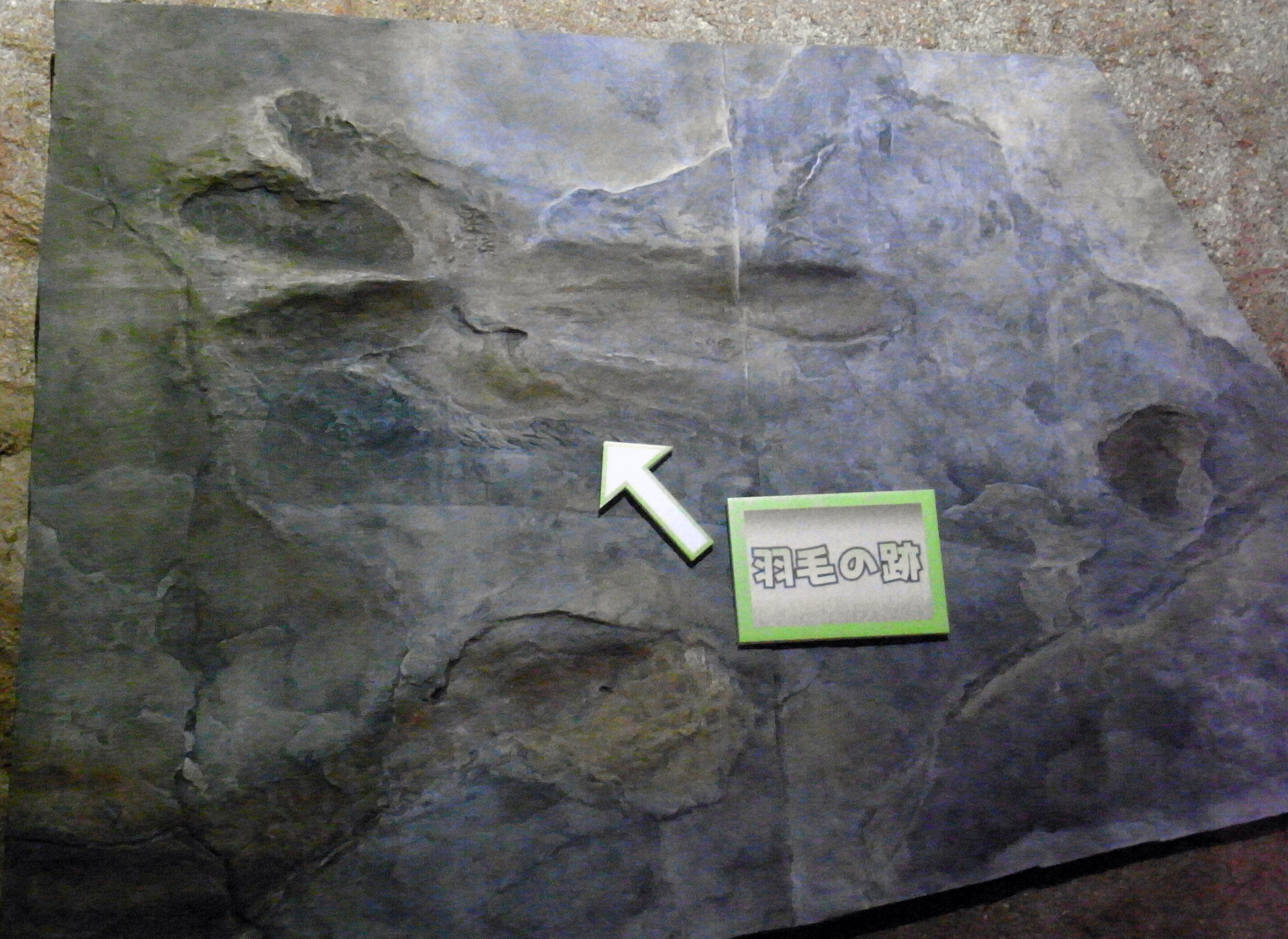
Cast in Japan of a resting trace from Massachusetts, which was argued to have been made by a theropod like Dilophosaurus and to include feather impressions around the belly (arrow), but this has been questioned

The paleontologist Robert E. Weems proposed in 2003 that Eubrontes tracks were not produced by a theropod, but by a sauropodomorph similar to Plateosaurus, excluding Dilophosaurus as a possible trackmaker. Instead, Weems proposed Kayentapus hopii, another ichnotaxon named by Welles in 1971, as the best match for Dilophosaurus. The attribution to Dilophosaurus was primarily based on the wide angle between digit impressions three and four shown by these tracks, and the observation that the foot of the holotype specimen shows a similarly splayed-out fourth digit. Also in 2003, paleontologist Emma Rainforth argued that the splay in the holotype foot was merely the result of distortion, and that Eubrontes would indeed be a good match for Dilophosaurus. The paleontologist Spencer G. Lucas and colleagues stated in 2006 that virtually universal agreement existed that Eubrontes tracks were made by a theropod like Dilophosaurus, and that they and other researchers dismissed Weems' claims.

In 2006, Weems defended his 2003 assessment of Eubrontes, and proposed an animal like Dilophosaurus as the possible trackmaker of numerous Kayentapus trackways of the Culpeper Quarry in Virginia. Weems suggested rounded impressions associated with some of these trackways to represent hand impressions lacking digit traces, which he interpreted as a trace of quadrupedal movement. Milner and colleagues used the new combination Kayentapus soltykovensis in 2009, and suggested that Dilophosauripus may not be distinct from Eubrontes and Kayentapus. They suggested that the long claw marks that were used to distinguish Dilophosauripus may be an artifact of dragging. They found that Gigandipus and Anchisauripus tracks may likewise also just represent variations of Eubrontes. They pointed out that differences between ichnotaxa may reflect how the trackmaker interacted with the substrate rather than taxonomy. They also found Dilophosaurus to be a suitable match for a Eubrontes trackway and resting trace (SGDS 18.T1) from the St. George Dinosaur Discovery Site in the Moenave Formation of Utah, though the dinosaur itself is not known from the formation, which is slightly older than the Kayenta Formation.

Weems stated in 2019 that Eubrontes tracks do not reflect the gracile feet of Dilophosaurus, and argued they were instead made by the bipedal sauropodomorph Anchisaurus. In a 2024 review of Jurassic tracks, the paleontologist John R. Foster and colleagues stated that few other ichnologists had accepted Weems' sauropodomorph interpretation of Eubrontes, partially because such tracks are abundant in places where no sauropodomorph fossils have been found.

== Paleobiology ==
=== Feeding and diet ===
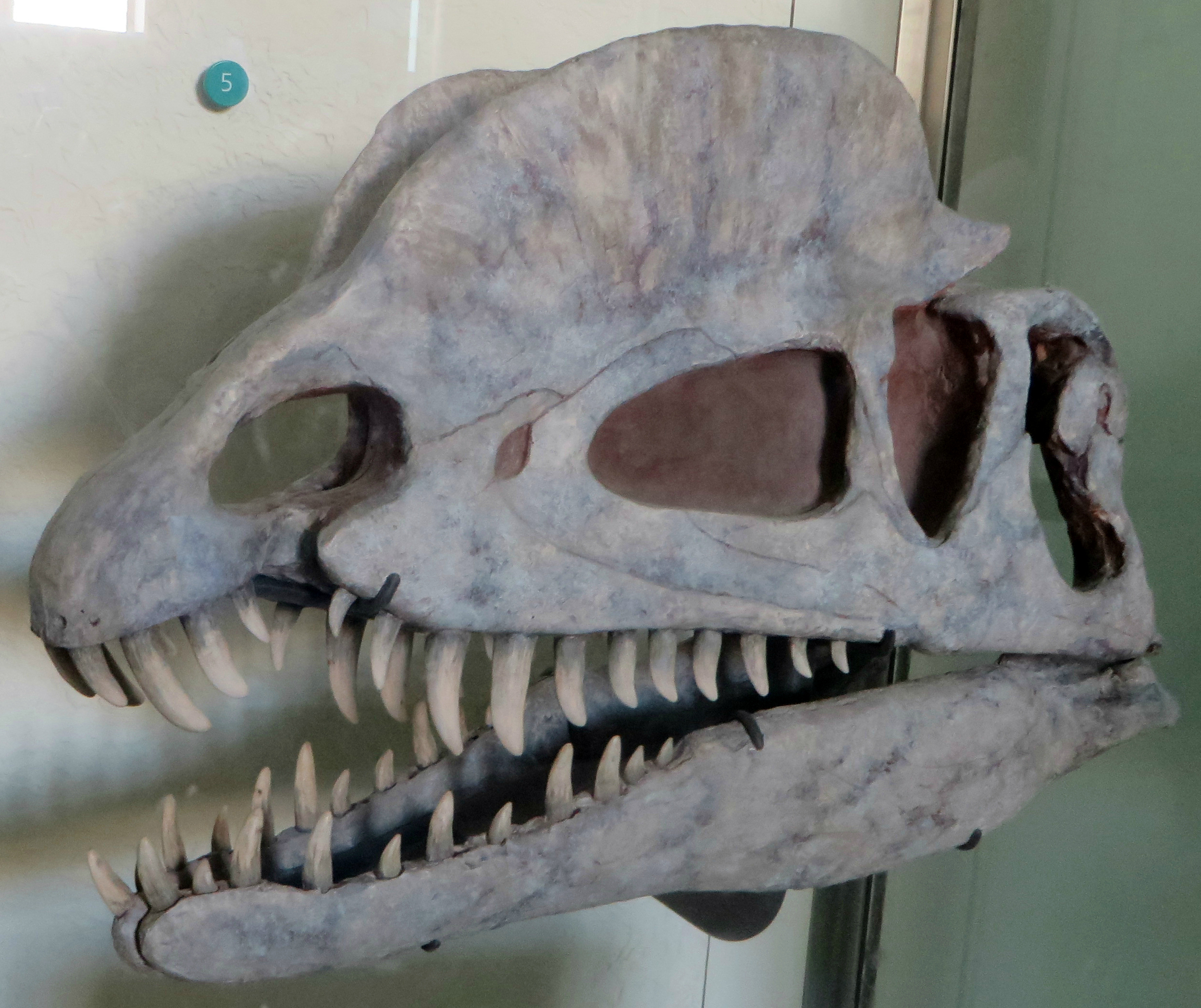
Reconstructed skull in semi-profile, American Museum of Natural History; note the subnarial gap, large upper teeth, and slender mandible

Welles found that Dilophosaurus did not have a powerful bite, due to weakness caused by the subnarial gap. He thought that it used its front premaxillary teeth for plucking and tearing rather than biting, and the maxillary teeth further back for piercing and slicing. He thought that it was probably a scavenger rather than a predator, and that if it did kill large animals, it would have done so with its hands and feet rather than its jaws. Welles did not find evidence of cranial kinesis in the skull of Dilophosaurus, a feature that allows individual bones of the skull to move in relation to each other. In 1986, the paleontologist Robert T. Bakker instead found Dilophosaurus, with its massive neck and skull and large upper teeth, to have been adapted for killing large prey, and strong enough to attack any Early Jurassic herbivores. In 1988, Paul dismissed the idea that Dilophosaurus was a scavenger, and claimed that strictly scavenging terrestrial animals are a myth. He stated that the snout of Dilophosaurus was better braced than had been thought previously, and that the very large, slender maxillary teeth were more lethal than the claws. Paul suggested that it hunted large animals such as prosauropods, and that it was more capable of snapping small animals than other theropods of a similar size.

A 2005 beam-theory study by the palaeontologist François Therrien and colleagues found that the bite force in the mandible of Dilophosaurus decreased rapidly hindwards in the tooth-throw. This indicates that the front of the mandible, with its upturned chin, "rosette" of teeth, and strengthened symphyseal region (similar to spinosaurids), was used to capture and manipulate prey, probably of relatively smaller size. The properties of its mandibular symphysis were similar to those of felids and crocodilians that use the front of their jaws to deliver a powerful bite when subduing prey. The loads exerted on the mandibles were consistent with struggle of small prey, which may have been hunted by delivering slashing bites to wound it, and then captured with the front of the jaws after being too weakened to resist. The prey may then have been moved further back into the jaws, where the largest teeth were located, and killed by slicing bites (similar to some crocodilians) with the sideways-compressed teeth. The authors suggested that if Dilophosaurus indeed fed on small prey, possible hunting packs would have been of limited size.

Milner and paleontologist James I. Kirkland suggested in 2007 that Dilophosaurus had features that indicate it may have eaten fish. They pointed out that the ends of the jaws were expanded to the sides, forming a "rosette" of interlocking teeth, similar to those of spinosaurids, known to have eaten fish, and gharials, which is the modern crocodile that eats the most fish. The nasal openings were also retracted back on the jaws, similar to spinosaurids, which have even more retracted nasal openings, and this may have limited water splashing into the nostrils during fishing. Both groups also had long arms with well-developed claws, which could help when catching fish. Lake Dixie, a large lake that extended from Utah to Arizona and Nevada, would have provided abundant fish in the "post-cataclysmic", biologically more impoverished world that followed the Triassic–Jurassic extinction event (wherein about three quarters of life on Earth vanished), 5 to 15 million years before Dilophosaurus appeared.

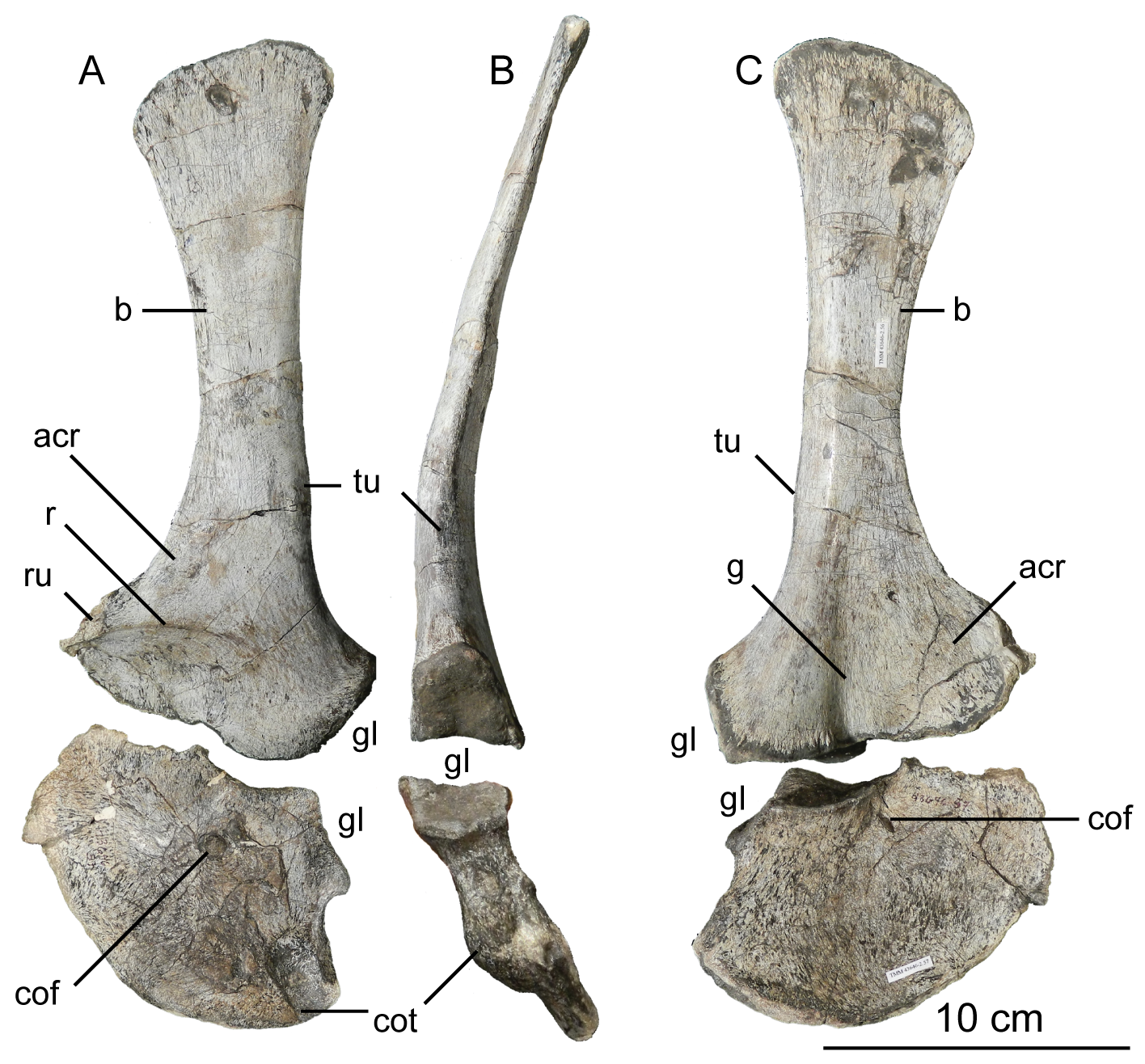
Scapula of Sarahsaurus with a probable tooth mark on its outer surface (C) possibly left by a scavenging Dilophosaurus

In 2018, Marsh and Rowe reported that the holotype specimen of the sauropodomorph Sarahsaurus bore possible tooth marks scattered across the skeleton that may have been left by Dilophosaurus (Syntarsus was too small to have produced them) scavenging the specimen after it died (the positions of the bones may also have been disturbed by scavenging). An example of such marks can be seen on the left scapula, which has an oval depression on the surface of its upper side, and a large hole on the lower front end of the right tibia. The quarry where the holotype and paratype specimens of Sarahsaurus were excavated also contained a partial immature Dilophosaurus specimen. Marsh and Rowe suggested in 2020 that many of the features that distinguished Dilophosaurus from earlier theropods were associated with increased body size and macropredation (preying on large animals). While Marsh and Rowe agreed that Dilophosaurus could have fed on fish and small prey in the fluvial system in its environment, they pointed out that the articulation between the premaxilla and maxilla of the upper jaw was immobile and much more robust than previously thought, and that large-bodied prey could have been grasped and manipulated with the forelimbs during predation and scavenging. They considered the large bite marks on Sarahsaurus specimens alongside shed teeth and the presence of a Dilophosaurus specimen within the same quarry as support for this idea.

In a 2021 article, paleontologist Matthew A. Brown and Rowe stated that these remains showed that Dilophosaurus had jaws strong enough to puncture bone. The fleshy air sacs from its respiratory system that grew into the vertebrae both strengthened and lightened the skeleton, and allowed unidirectional airflow through its lungs, similar to birds and crocodiles, and thereby more oxygen than a bidirectional respiratory system of mammals (wherein the air flows in and out of the lungs). Unidirectional breathing indicates relatively high metabolic rates and therefore high levels of activity, indicating that Dilophosaurus was likely a fast, agile hunter. Brown and Rowe considered Dilophosaurus to have been an apex predator in its ecosystem, and not a scavenger.

=== Motion ===
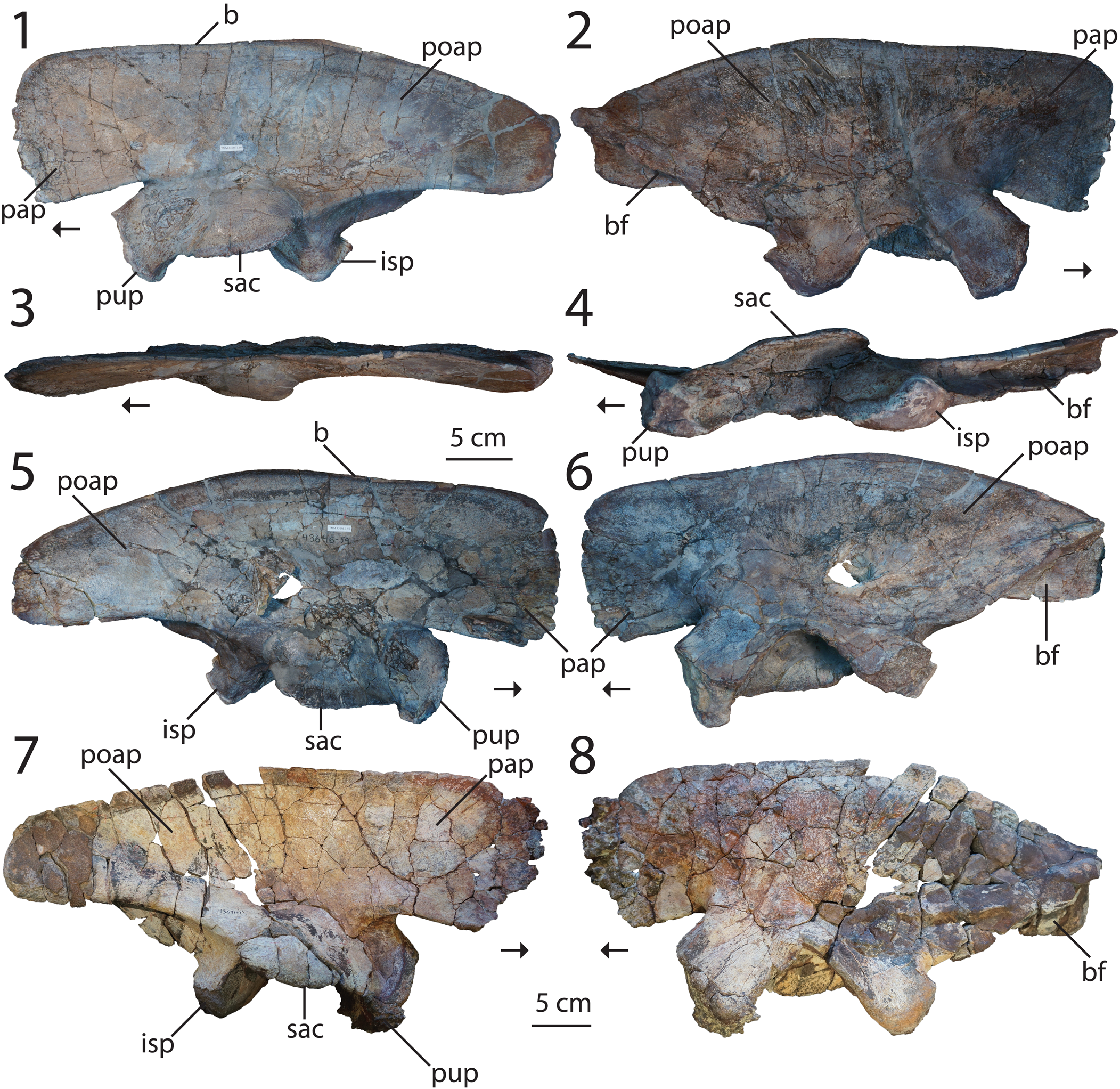
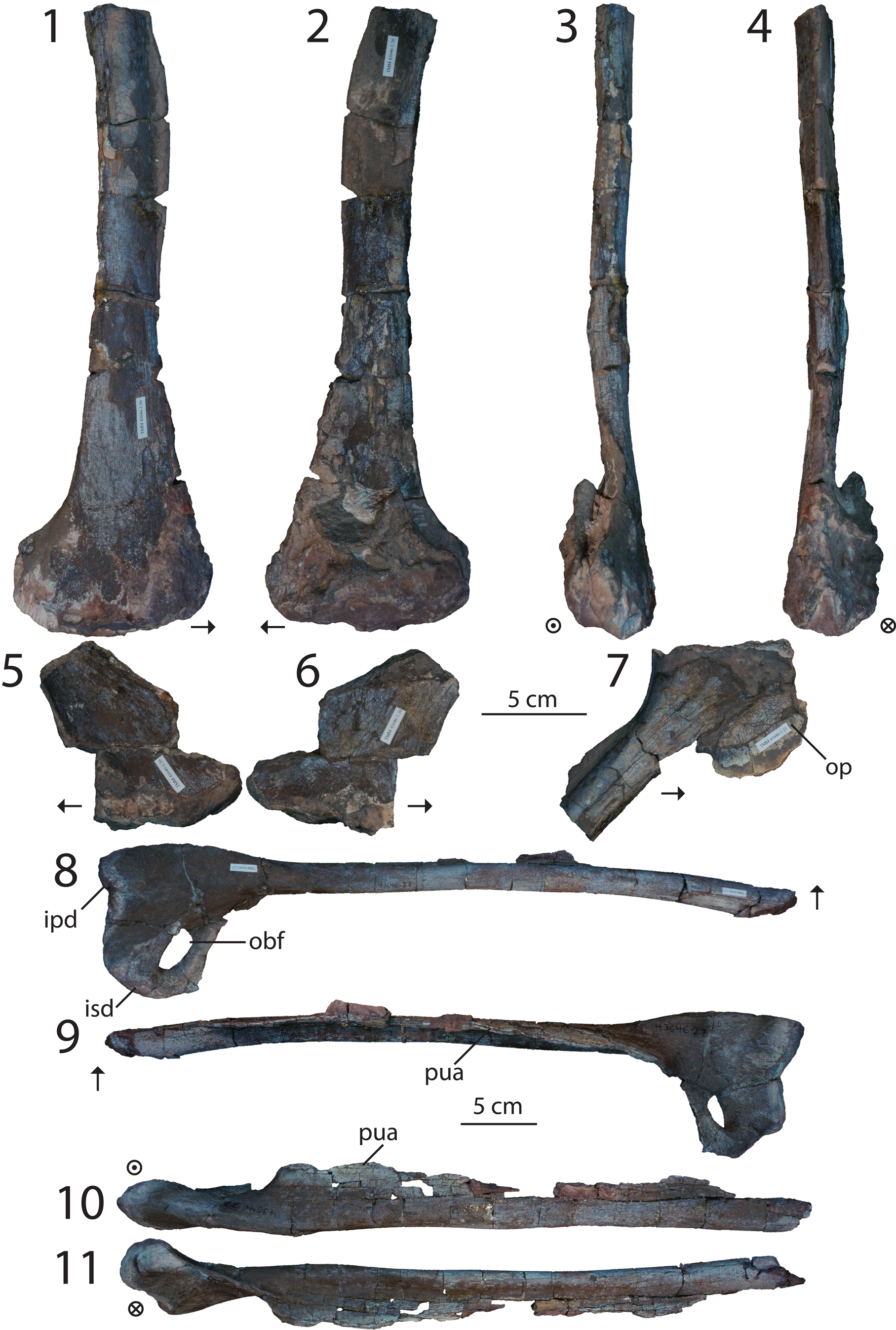
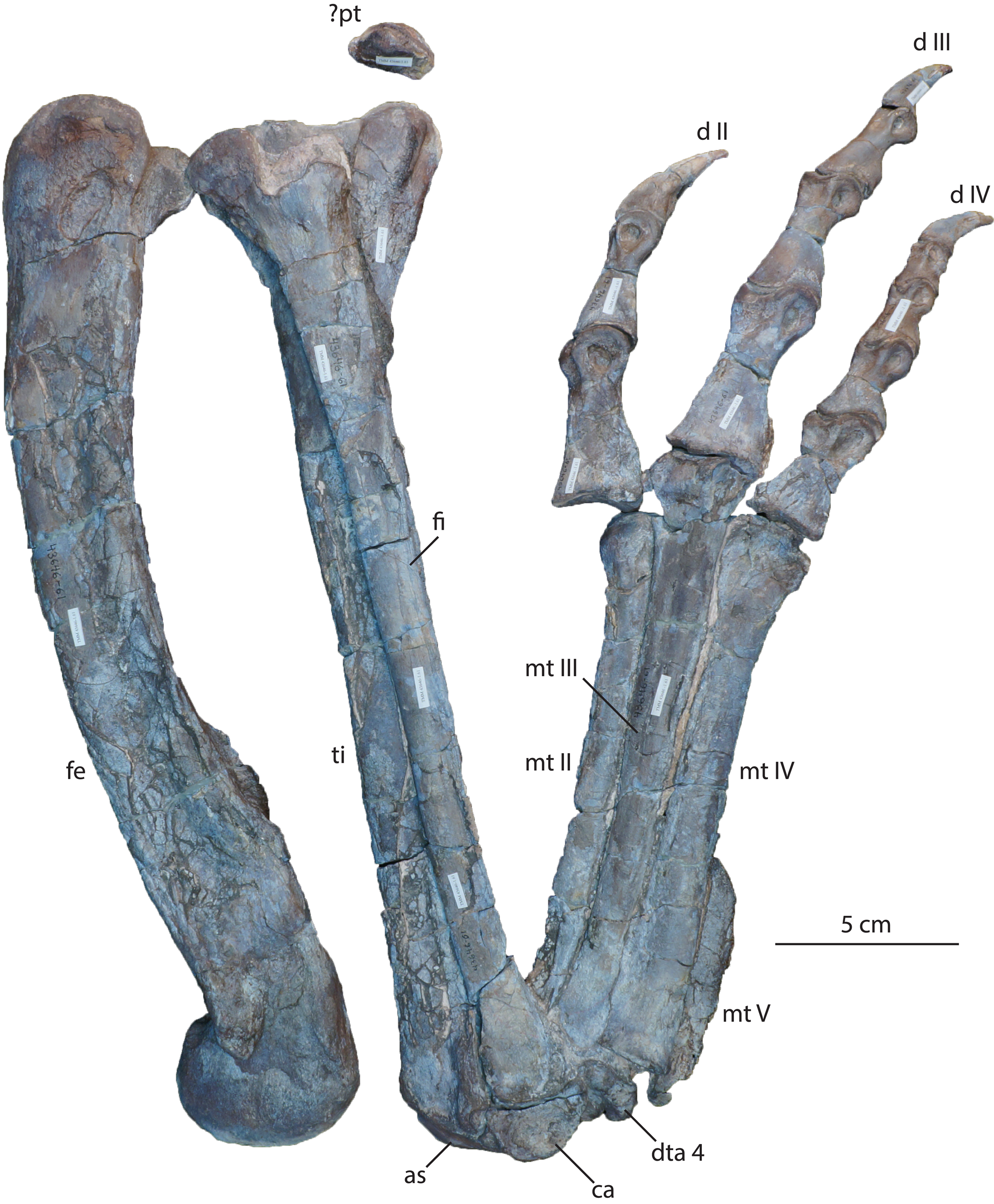
Hand bones (upper left), ilia (upper middle), ischia and pubes (upper right), right leg (lower left), femora (lower middle), and foot bones (lower right) of assigned specimen TMM 43646-1

Welles envisioned Dilophosaurus as an active, clearly bipedal animal, similar to an enlarged ostrich. He found the forelimbs to have been powerful weapons, strong and flexible, and not used for locomotion. He noted that the hands were capable of grasping and slashing, of meeting each other, and reaching two-thirds up the neck. He proposed that in a sitting posture, the animal would rest on the large "foot" of its ischium, as well as its tail and feet. In 1990, paleontologists Stephen and Sylvia Czerkas suggested that the weak pelvis of Dilophosaurus could have been an adaptation for an aquatic lifestyle, where the water would help support its weight, and that it could have been an efficient swimmer. They found it doubtful that it would have been restricted to a watery environment, though, due to the strength and proportions of its hind limbs, which would have made it fleet-footed and agile during bipedal locomotion. In 1998, paleontologist Per Christiansen estimated the top speed of Dilophosaurus to have been 43–69 km (27–43 mi) per hour. Paul depicted Dilophosaurus in 2000 bouncing on its tail while lashing out at an enemy, similar to a kangaroo.

In 2005, paleontologists Phil Senter and James H. Robins examined the range of motion in the forelimbs of Dilophosaurus and other theropods. They found that Dilophosaurus would have been able to draw its humerus backward until it was almost parallel with the scapula, but could not move it forwards to a more than vertical orientation. The elbow could approach full extension and flexion at a right angle, but not achieve it completely. The fingers do not appear to have been voluntarily hyperextensible (able to extend backwards, beyond their normal range), but they may have been passively hyperextensible, to resist dislocation during violent movements by captured prey. A 2015 article by Senter and Robins gave recommendations for how to reconstruct the fore limb posture in bipedal dinosaurs, based on examination of various taxa, including Dilophosaurus. The scapulae were held very horizontally, the resting orientation of the elbow would have been close to a right angle, and the orientation of the hand would not have deviated much from that of the lower arm.

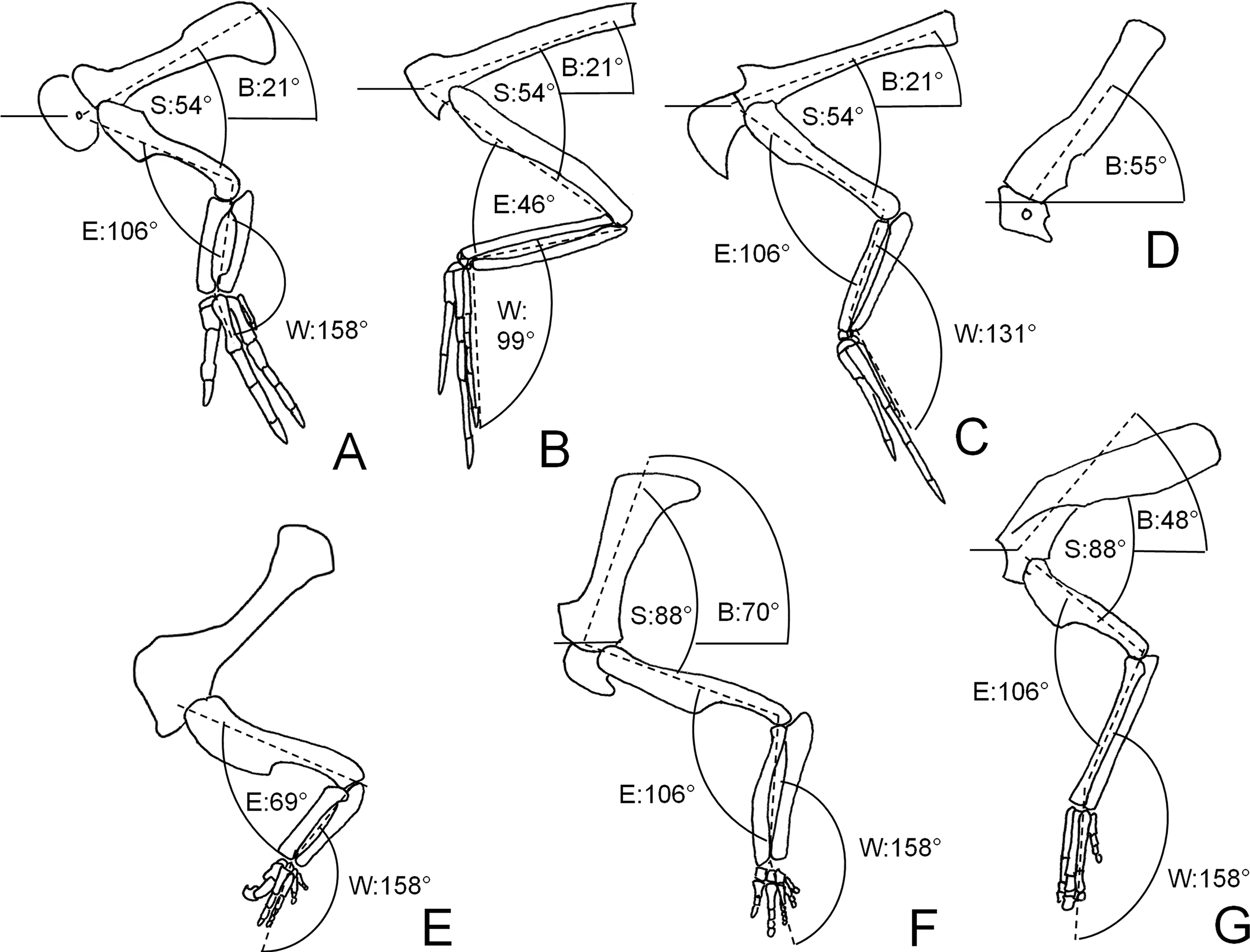
Diagram showing the forelimbs of Dilophosaurus (A) and other dinosaurs in hypothesized resting posture

In 2018, Senter and Corwin Sullivan examined the range of motion in the fore limb joints of Dilophosaurus by manipulating the bones, to test hypothesized functions of the fore limbs. They also took into account that experiments with alligator carcasses show that the range of motion is greater in elbows covered in soft tissue (such as cartilage, ligaments, and muscles) than what would be indicated by manipulation of bare bones. They found that the humerus of Dilophosaurus could be retracted into a position that was almost parallel with the scapula, protracted to an almost vertical level, and elevated 65°. The elbow could not be flexed past a right angle to the humerus. Pronation and supination of the wrists (crossing the radius and ulna bones of the lower arm to turn the hand) was prevented by the radius and ulna joints not being able to roll, and the palms, therefore, faced medially, towards each other. The inability to pronate the wrists was an ancestral feature shared by theropods and other dinosaur groups. The wrist had limited mobility, and the fingers diverged during flexion, and were very hyperextensible.

Senter and Sullivan concluded that Dilophosaurus was able to grip and hold objects between two hands, to grip and hold small objects in one hand, to seize objects close beneath the chest, to bring an object to the mouth, to perform a display by swinging the arms in an arc along the sides of the ribcage, to scratch the chest, belly, or the half of the other forelimb farthest from the body, to seize prey beneath the chest or the base of the neck, and to clutch objects to the chest. Dilophosaurus was unable to perform scratch-digging, hook-pulling, to hold objects between two fingertips of one hand, to maintain balance by extending the arms outwards to the sides, or to probe small crevices like the modern aye-aye does. The hyperextensibility of the fingers may have prevented the prey's violent struggle from dislocating them, since it would have allowed greater motion of the fingers (with no importance to locomotion). The limited mobility of the shoulder and shortness of the forelimbs indicates that the mouth made first contact with the prey rather than the hands. Capture of prey with the forelimbs would only be possible for seizing animals small enough to fit beneath the chest of Dilophosaurus, or larger prey that had been forced down with its mouth. The great length of the head and neck would have enabled the snout to extend much further than the hands.

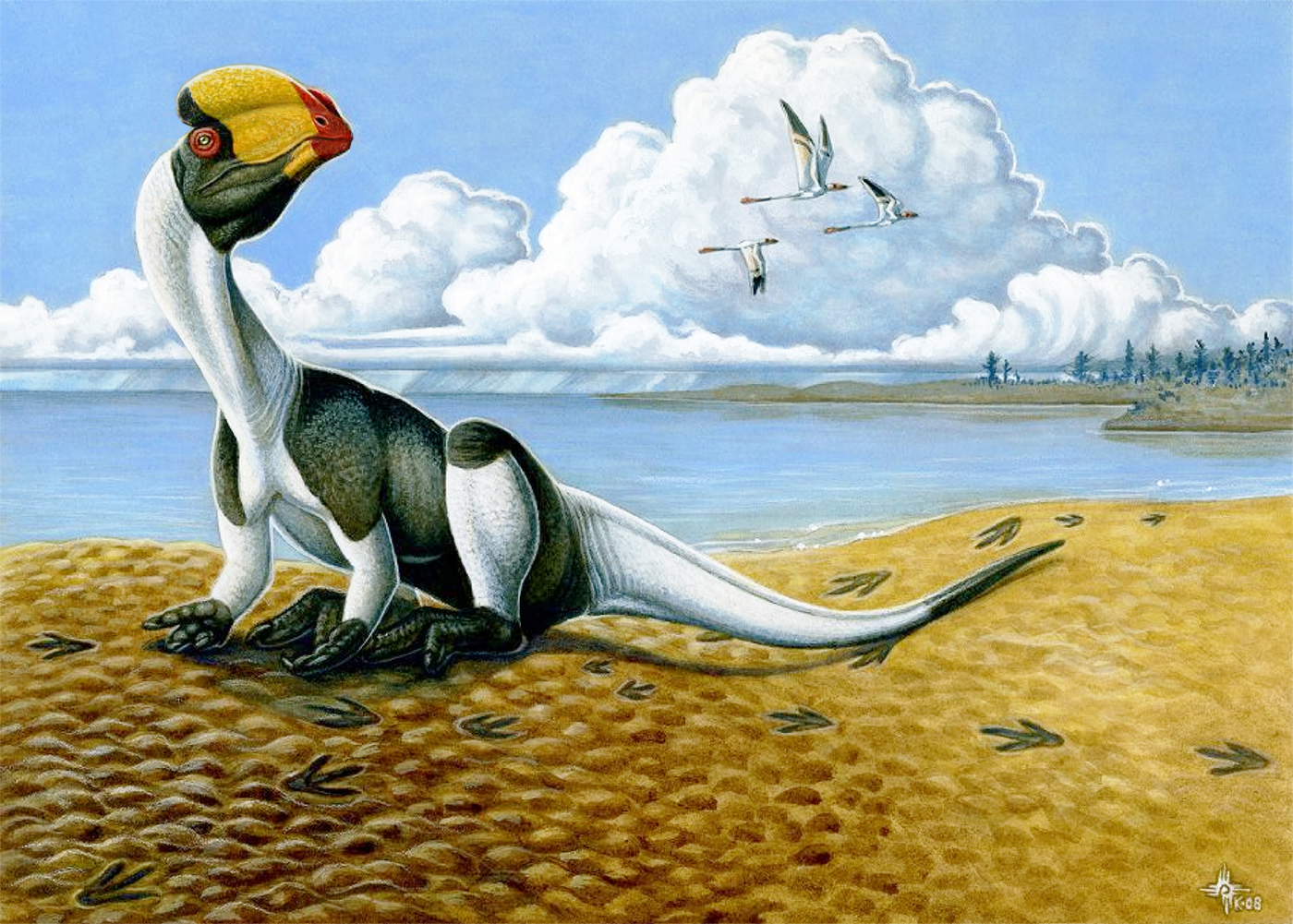
Restoration of Dilophosaurus in a bird-like resting pose, based on a resting trace at the St. George Dinosaur Discovery Site, Utah

The Dilophosauripus footprints reported by Welles in 1971 were all on the same level, and were described as a "chicken yard hodge-podge" of footprints, with few forming a trackway. The footprints had been imprinted in mud, which allowed the feet to sink down 5–10 cm (2–4 in). The prints were sloppy, and the varying breadth of the toe prints indicates that mud had clung to the feet. The impressions varied according to differences in the substrate and the manner in which they were made; sometimes, the foot was planted directly, but often a backward or forward slip occurred as the foot came down. The positions and angles of the toes also varied considerably, which indicate they must have been quite flexible. The Dilophosauripus footprints had an offset second toe with a thick base, and very long, straight claws that were in line with the axes of the toe pads. One of the footprints was missing the claw of the second toe, perhaps due to injury. In 1984, Welles interpreted the fact that three individuals were found close together, and the presence of criss-crossed trackways nearby, as indications that Dilophosaurus traveled in groups. Gay agreed that they may have traveled in small groups, but noted that no direct evidence supported this, and that flash floods could have picked up scattered bones from different individuals and deposited them together.

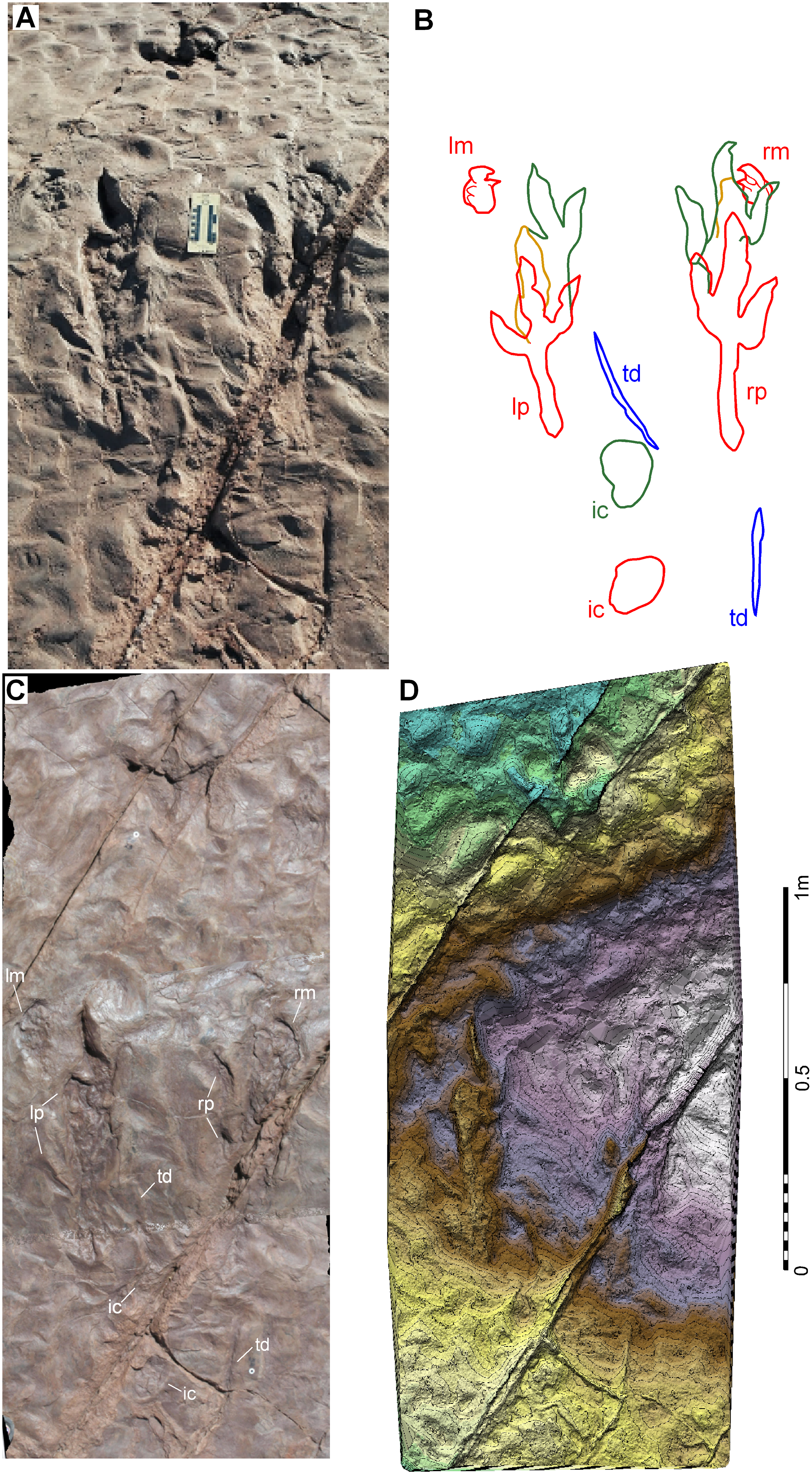
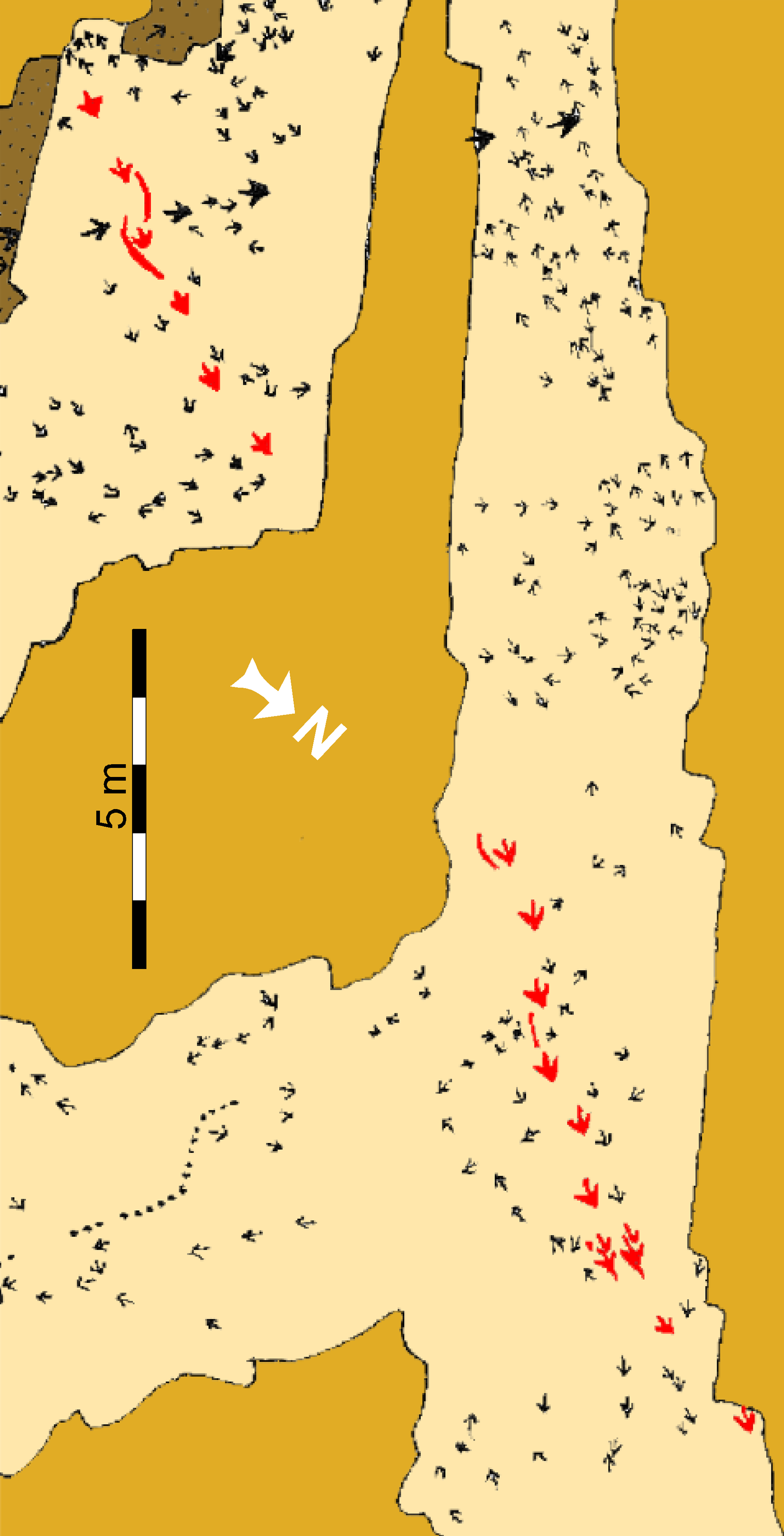
Eubrontes resting trace (left) of a theropod similar to Dilophosaurus, SGDS 18.T1, and map of the site (right) with this Eubrontes trackway in red

Milner and colleagues examined the possible Dilophosaurus trackway SGDS 18.T1 in 2009, which consists of typical footprints with tail drags and a more unusual resting trace, deposited in lacustrine beach sandstone. The trackway began with the animal first oriented approximately in parallel with the shoreline, and then stopping by a berm with both feet in parallel, whereafter it lowered its body, and brought its metatarsals and the callosity around its ischium to the ground; this created impressions of symmetrical "heels" and circular impressions of the ischium. The part of the tail closest to the body was kept off the ground, whereas the end further away from the body made contact with the ground. The fact that the animal rested on a slope is what enabled it to bring both hands to the ground close to the feet. After resting, the dinosaur shuffled forwards, and left new impressions with its feet, metatarsals, and ischium, but not the hands. The right foot now stepped on the print of the right hand, and the second claw of the left foot made a drag mark from the first resting position to the next. After some time, the animal stood up and moved forwards, with the left foot first, and once fully erect, it walked across the rest of the exposed surface, while leaving thin drag marks with the end of the tail.

Crouching is a rarely captured behavior of theropods, and SGDS 18.T1 is the only such track with unambiguous impressions of theropod hands, which provides valuable information about how they used their forelimbs. The crouching posture was found to be very similar to that of modern birds, and shows that early theropods held the palms of their hands facing medially, towards each other. As such a posture therefore evolved early in the lineage, it may have characterized all theropods. Theropods are often depicted with their palms facing downwards, but studies of their functional anatomy have shown that they, like birds, were unable to pronate or supinate their arms. The track showed that the legs were held symmetrically with the body weight distributed between the feet and the metatarsals, which is also a feature seen in birds such as ratites. Milner and colleagues also dismissed the idea that the Kayentapus minor track reported by Weems showed a palm imprint made by a quadrupedally walking theropod. Weems had proposed the trackmaker would have been able to move quadrupedally when walking slowly, while the digits would have been habitually hyperextended so only the palms touched the ground. Milner and colleagues found the inferred pose unnecessary, and suggested the track was instead made in a similar way as SGDS 18.T1, but without leaving traces of the digits.

=== Crest function ===
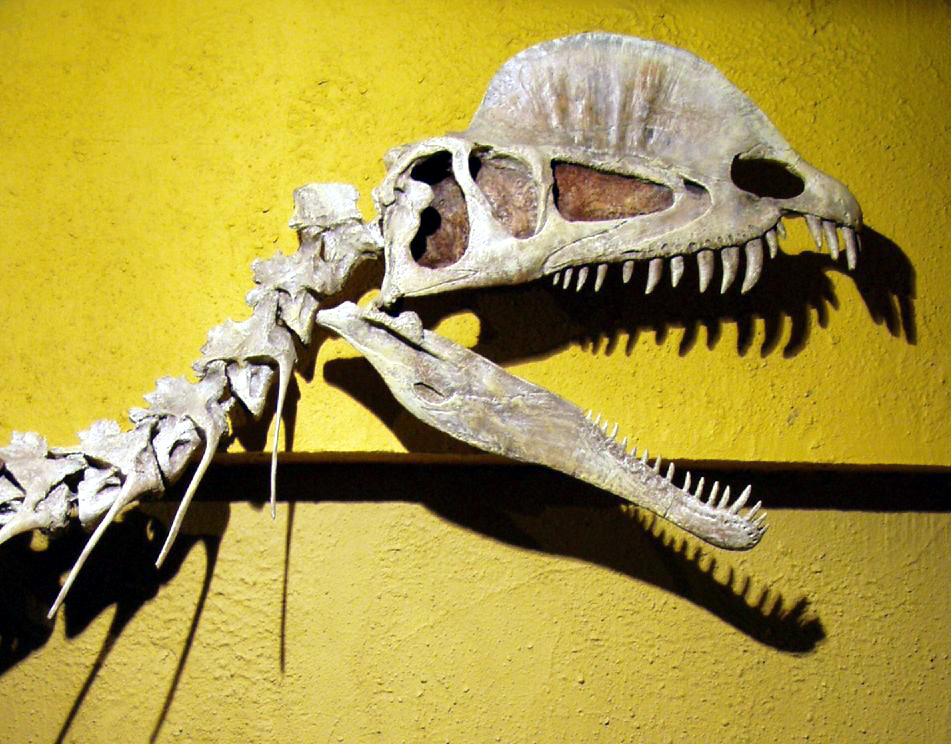
Reconstructed skull and neck, RTM

Welles conceded that suggestions as to the function of the crests of Dilophosaurus were conjectural, but thought that, though the crests had no grooves to indicate vascularization, they could have been used for thermoregulation. He also suggested they could have been used for species recognition or ornamentation. Bakker considered the crests sexual adornments in 1986, noting they were so thin that they could only have been for visual effect, unlike the heavier crests of allosaurs, which could have been used for head-butting. The Czerkas pointed out in 1990 that the crests could not have been used during battle, as their delicate structure would have been easily damaged. They suggested that they were a visual display for attracting a mate, and even thermoregulation. In 1990, paleontologist Walter P. Coombs stated that the crests may have been enhanced by colors for use in display.

In 2011 the paleontologists Kevin Padian and John R. Horner proposed that "bizarre structures" in dinosaurs in general (including crests, frills, horns, and domes) were primarily used for species recognition, and dismissed other explanations as unsupported by evidence. They noted that too few specimens of cranially ornamented theropods, including Dilophosaurus, were known to test their evolutionary function statistically, and whether they represented sexual dimorphism or sexual maturity. In a response to Padian and Horner the same year, the paleontologists Rob J. Knell and Scott D. Sampson argued that species recognition was not unlikely as a secondary function for "bizarre structures" in dinosaurs, but that sexual selection (used in display or combat to compete for mates) was a more likely explanation, due to the high cost of developing them, and because such structures appear to be highly variable within species.

In 2013, paleontologists David E. Hone and Darren Naish criticized the "species recognition hypothesis", and argued that no extant animals use such structures primarily for species recognition, and that Padian and Horner had ignored the possibility of mutual sexual selection (where both sexes are ornamented). Marsh and Rowe agreed in 2020 that the crests of Dilophosaurus likely had a role in species identification or intersexual/intrasexual selection, as in some modern birds. It is unknown if the air sacs in the crests supported such functions.

=== Development ===
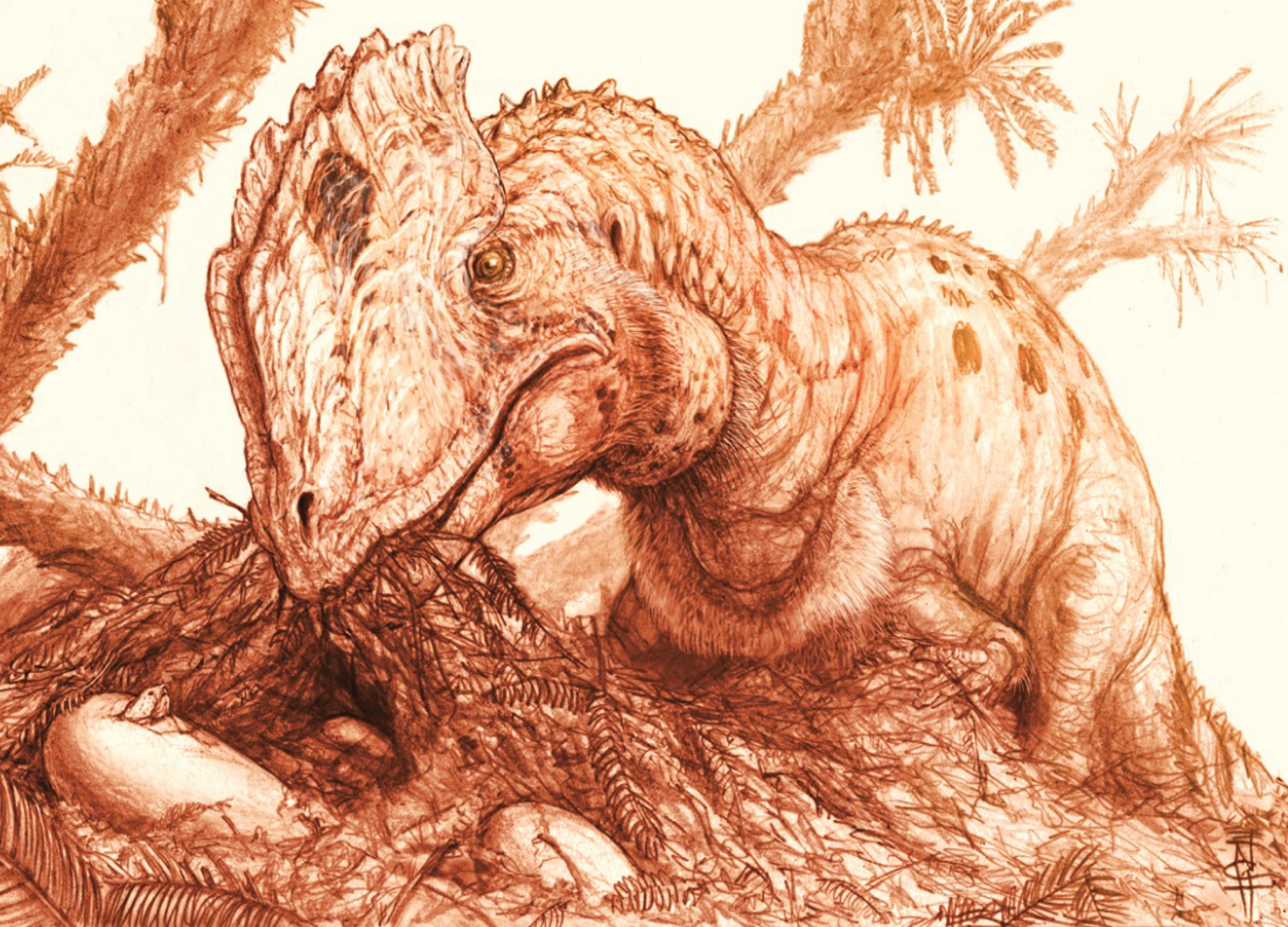
Restoration of an adult tending to its hatching clutch

Welles originally interpreted the smaller Dilophosaurus specimens as juveniles, and the larger specimen as an adult, later interpreting them as different species. Paul suggested that the differences between the specimens was perhaps due to sexual dimorphism, as was seemingly also apparent in Coelophysis, which had "robust" and "gracile" forms of the same size, that might otherwise have been regarded as separate species. Following this scheme, the smaller Dilophosaurus specimen would represent a "gracile" example.

In 2005 Tykoski found that most Dilophosaurus specimens known were juvenile individuals, with only the largest an adult, based on the level of co-ossification of the bones. In 2005 Gay found no evidence of the sexual dimorphism suggested by Paul (but supposedly present in Coelophysis), and attributed the variation seen between Dilophosaurus specimens to individual variation and ontogeny (changes during growth). There was no dimorphism in the skeletons, but he did not rule out that there could have been in the crests; more data was needed to determine this. Based on the tiny nasal crests on a juvenile specimen, Yates had tentatively assigned to the related genus Dracovenator, he suggested that these would have grown larger as the animal became adult.

The paleontologist J.S. Tkach reported a histological study (microscopical study of internal features) of Dilophosaurus in 1996, conducted by taking thin sections of long bones and ribs of specimen UCMP 37303 (the lesser preserved of the two original skeletons). The bone tissues were well vascularized and had a fibro-lamellar structure similar to that found in other theropods and the sauropodomorph Massospondylus. The plexiform (woven) structure of the bones suggested rapid growth, and Dilophosaurus may have attained a growth rate of 30 to 35 kilograms (66 to 77 lb) per year early in life.

Welles found that the replacement teeth of Dilophosaurus and other theropods originated deep inside the bone, decreasing in size the farther they were from the alveolar border. There were usually two or three replacement teeth in the alveoli, with the youngest being a small, hollow crown. The replacement teeth erupted on the outer side of the old teeth. When a tooth neared the gum line, the inner wall between the interdental plates was resorbed and formed a nutrient notch. As the new tooth erupted, it moved outwards to center itself in the alveolus, and the nutrient notch closed over.

=== Paleopathology ===
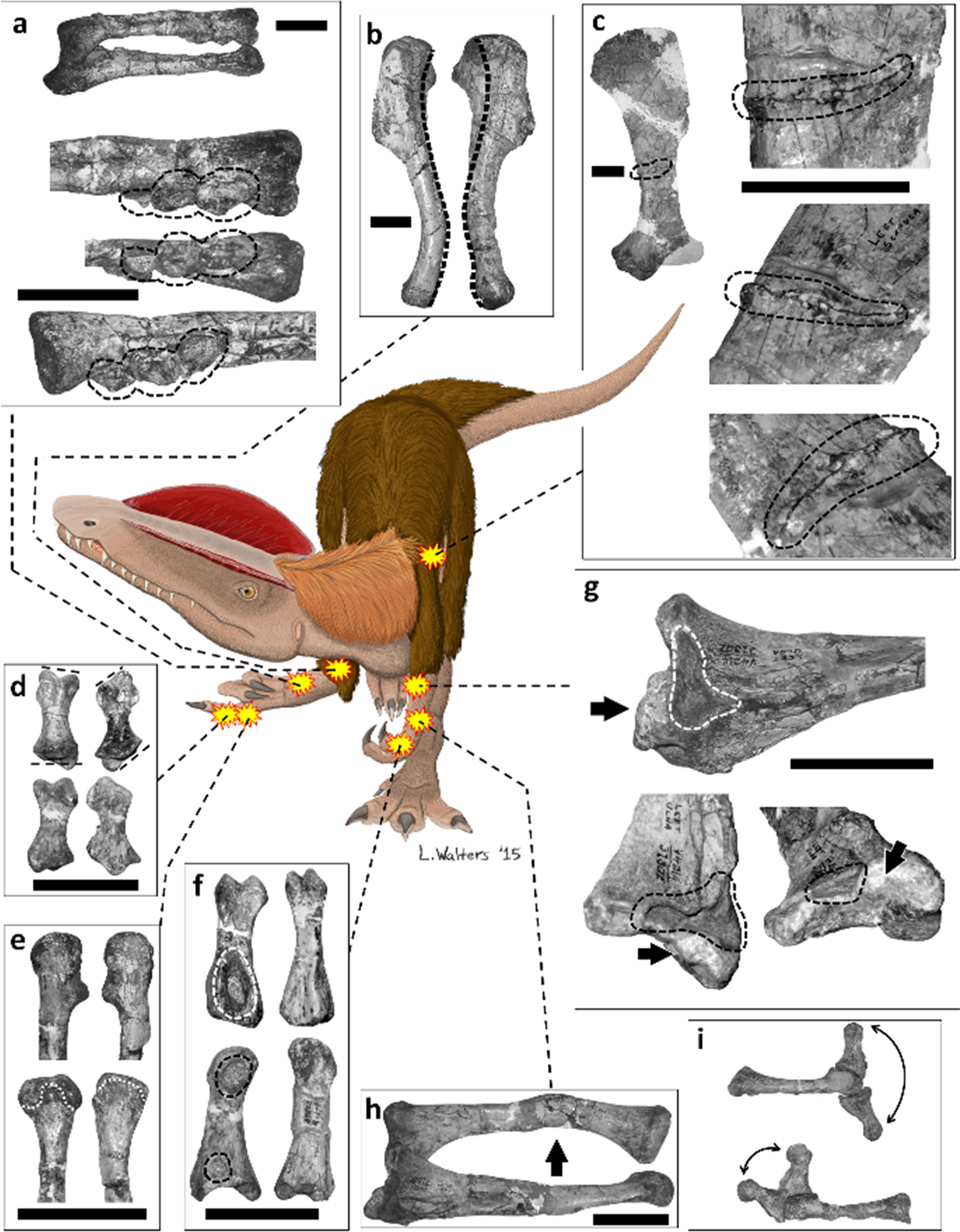
Paleopathologies in bones of the holotype, plotted onto a life restoration

Welles noted various paleopathologies (ancient signs of disease, such as injuries and malformations) in Dilophosaurus. The holotype had a sulcus (groove or furrow) on the neural arch of a cervical vertebra that may have been due to an injury or crushing, and two pits on the right humerus that may have been abscesses (collections of pus) or artifacts. Welles also noted that it had a smaller and more delicate left humerus than the right, but with the reverse condition in its forearms. In 2001, paleontologist Ralph Molnar suggested that this was caused by a developmental anomaly called fluctuating asymmetry. This anomaly can be caused by stress in animal populations, for example due to disturbances in their environment, and may indicate more intense selective pressure. Asymmetry can also result from traumatic events in early development of an animal, which would be more randomly distributed in time. A 2001 study conducted by paleontologist Bruce Rothschild and colleagues examined 60 Dilophosaurus foot bones for signs of stress fractures (which are caused by strenuous, repetitive actions), but none were found. Such injuries can be the result of very active, predatory lifestyles.

In 2016 Senter and Sara L. Juengst examined the paleopathologies of the holotype specimen and found that it bore the greatest and most varied number of such maladies on the pectoral girdle and forelimb of any theropod dinosaur so far described, some of which are not known from any other dinosaur. Only six other theropods are known with more than one paleopathology on the pectoral girdle and forelimbs. The holotype specimen had eight afflicted bones, whereas no other theropod specimen is known with more than four. On its left side, it had a fractured scapula and radius, and fibriscesses (like abscesses) in the ulna and the outer phalanx bone of the thumb. On the right side it had torsion of its humeral shaft, three bony tumors on its radius, a truncated articular surface of its third metacarpal bone, and deformities on the first phalanx bone of the third finger. This finger was permanently deformed and unable to flex. The deformities of the humerus and the third finger may have been due to osteodysplasia, which had not been reported from non-avian dinosaurs before, but is known in birds. Affecting juvenile birds that have experienced malnutrition, this disease can cause pain in one limb, which makes the birds prefer to use the other limb instead, which thereby develops torsion.

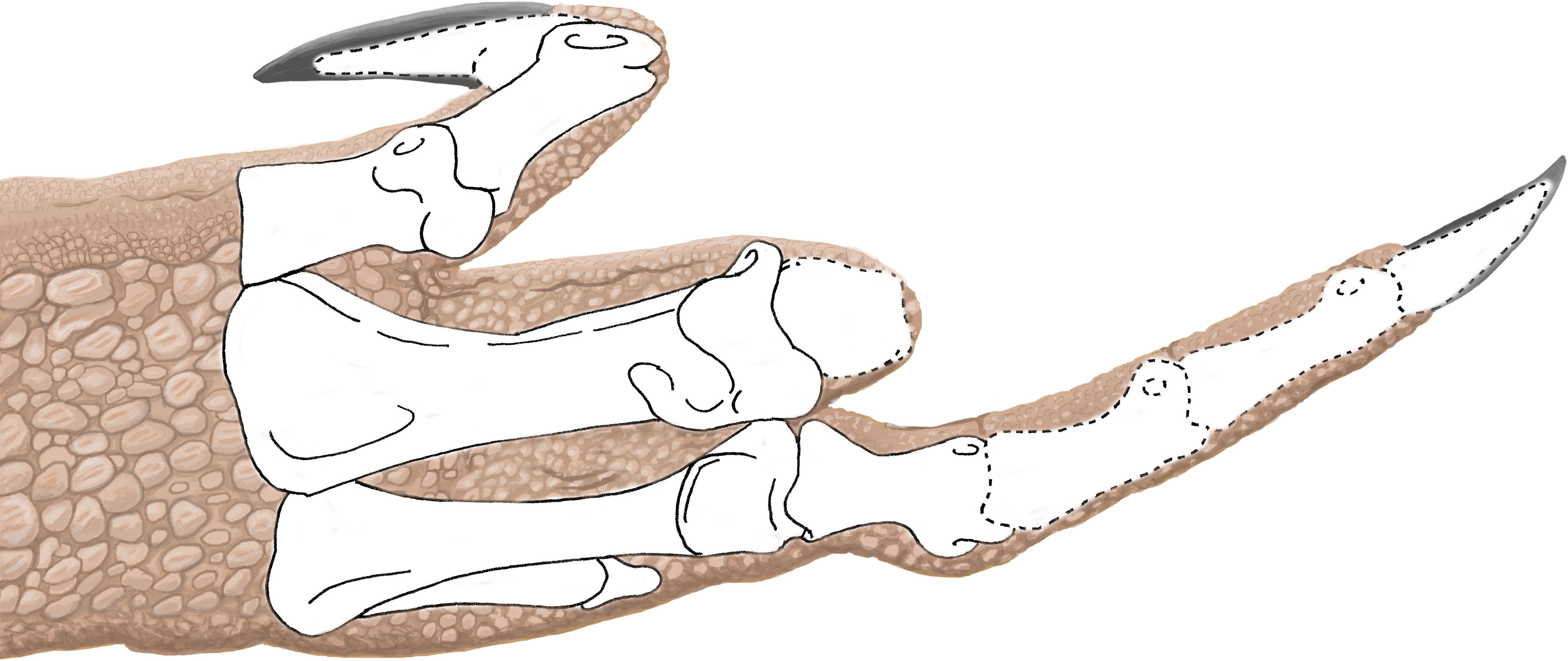
Restoration of the right hand of the holotype in flexion, with the deformed third finger (below) unable to flex

The number of traumatic events that led to these features is not certain, and it is possible that they were all caused by a single encounter, for example by crashing into a tree or rock during a fight with another animal, which may have caused puncture wounds with its claws. Since all the injuries had healed, it is certain that the Dilophosaurus survived for a long time after these events, for months, perhaps years. The use of the forelimbs for prey capture must have been compromised during the healing process. The dinosaur may therefore have endured a long period of fasting or subsisted on prey that was small enough for it to dispatch with the mouth and feet, or with one forelimb.

According to Senter and Juengst, the high degree of pain the dinosaur might have experienced in multiple locations for long durations also shows that it was a hardy animal. They noted that paleopathologies in dinosaurs are underreported, and that even though Welles had thoroughly described the holotype, he had mentioned only one of the pathologies found by them. They suggested that such features may sometimes be omitted because descriptions of species are concerned with their characteristics rather than abnormalities, or because such features are difficult to recognize. Senter and Sullivan found that the pathologies significantly altered the range of motion in the right shoulder and right third finger of the holotype, and that estimates for range of motion may therefore not match those made for a healthy forelimb.

== Paleoenvironment ==
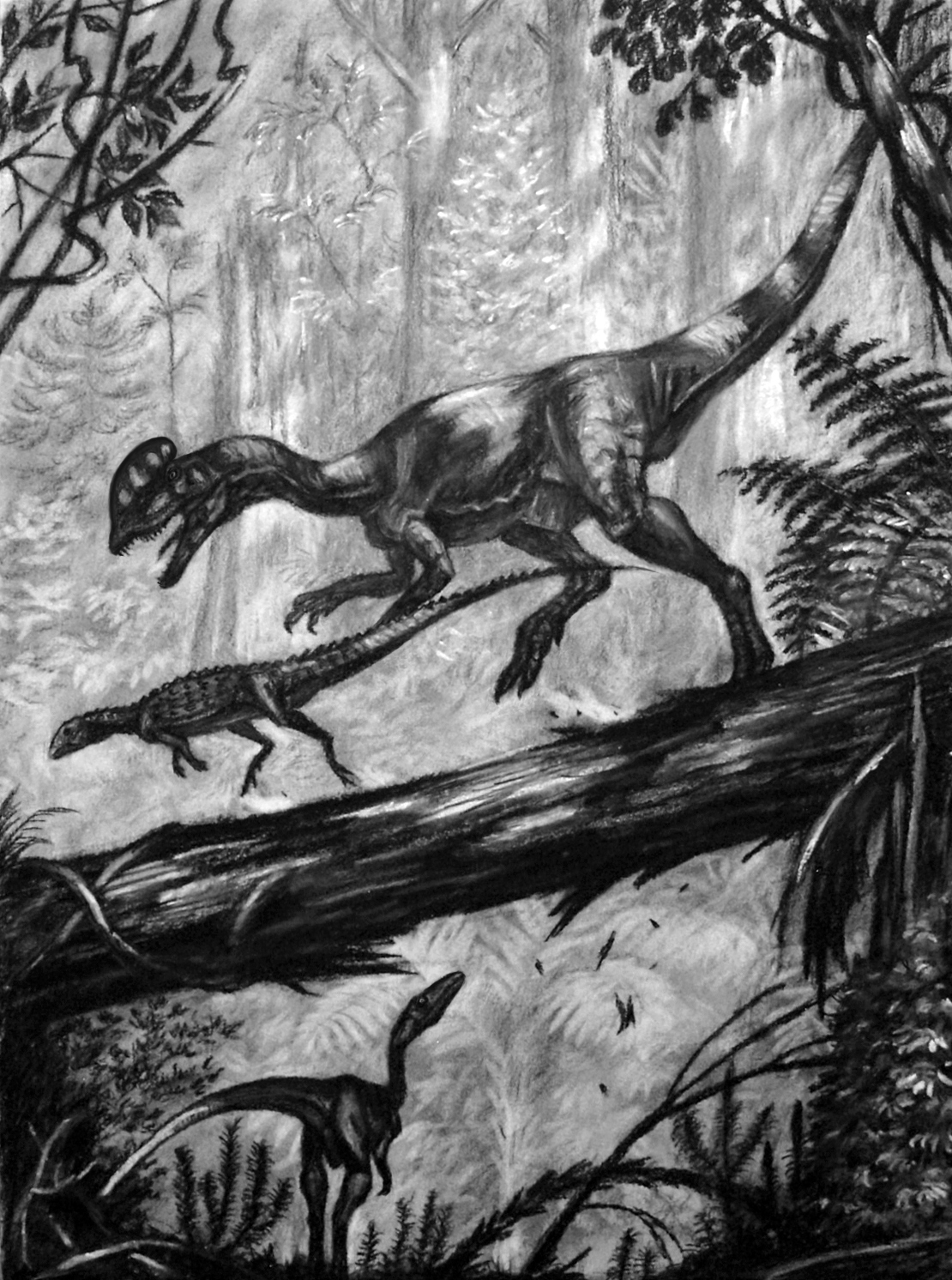
Restoration of Dilophosaurus chasing Scutellosaurus

Dilophosaurus is known from the Kayenta Formation, which dates to the Sinemurian-Toarcian stages of the Early Jurassic, approximately 196–186 million years ago (187–190 mya has also been suggested, and the age of the Kayenta is considered complex). As Dilophosaurus is known from the base to the middle of the formation, which is Pliensbachian in age, the taxon had a chronostratigraphic range of 15 million years. The Kayenta Formation is part of the Glen Canyon Group that includes formations in northern Arizona, parts of southeastern Utah, western Colorado, and northwestern New Mexico. It is composed mostly of two facies, one dominated by siltstone deposition and the other by sandstone. The siltstone facies is found in much of Arizona, while the sandstone facies is present in areas of northern Arizona, southern Utah, western Colorado, and northwestern New Mexico. The formation was primarily deposited by rivers, with the siltstone facies as the slower, more sluggish part of the river system. Kayenta Formation deposition was ended by the encroaching dune field that would become the Navajo Sandstone. The environment was seasonally dry, with sand dunes migrating in and out of the wet environments where animals lived, and has been likened to a river oasis; a waterway lined with conifers and surrounded by sand.

The Kayenta Formation has yielded a small but growing assemblage of organisms. Most fossils are from the siltstone facies. Most organisms known so far are vertebrates. Non-vertebrates include microbial or "algal" limestone, petrified wood, plant impressions, freshwater bivalves and snails, ostracods, and invertebrate trace fossils. Vertebrates are known from both body fossils and trace fossils. Vertebrates known from body fossils include hybodont sharks, indeterminate bony fish, lungfish, salamanders, the frog Prosalirus, the caecilian Eocaecilia, the turtle Kayentachelys, a sphenodontian reptile, lizards, and several early crocodylomorphs including Calsoyasuchus, Eopneumatosuchus, Kayentasuchus, and Protosuchus, and the pterosaur Rhamphinion. Apart from Dilophosaurus, several dinosaurs are known, including the theropods Megapnosaurus, and Kayentavenator, the sauropodomorph Sarahsaurus, a heterodontosaurid, and the thyreophoran Scutellosaurus. Synapsids include the tritylodontids Dinnebitodon, Kayentatherium, and Oligokyphus, morganucodontids, the possible early true mammal Dinnetherium, and a haramiyid mammal. The majority of these finds come from the vicinity of Gold Spring, Arizona. Vertebrate trace fossils include coprolites and the tracks of therapsids, lizard-like animals, and several types of dinosaur.

=== Taphonomy ===
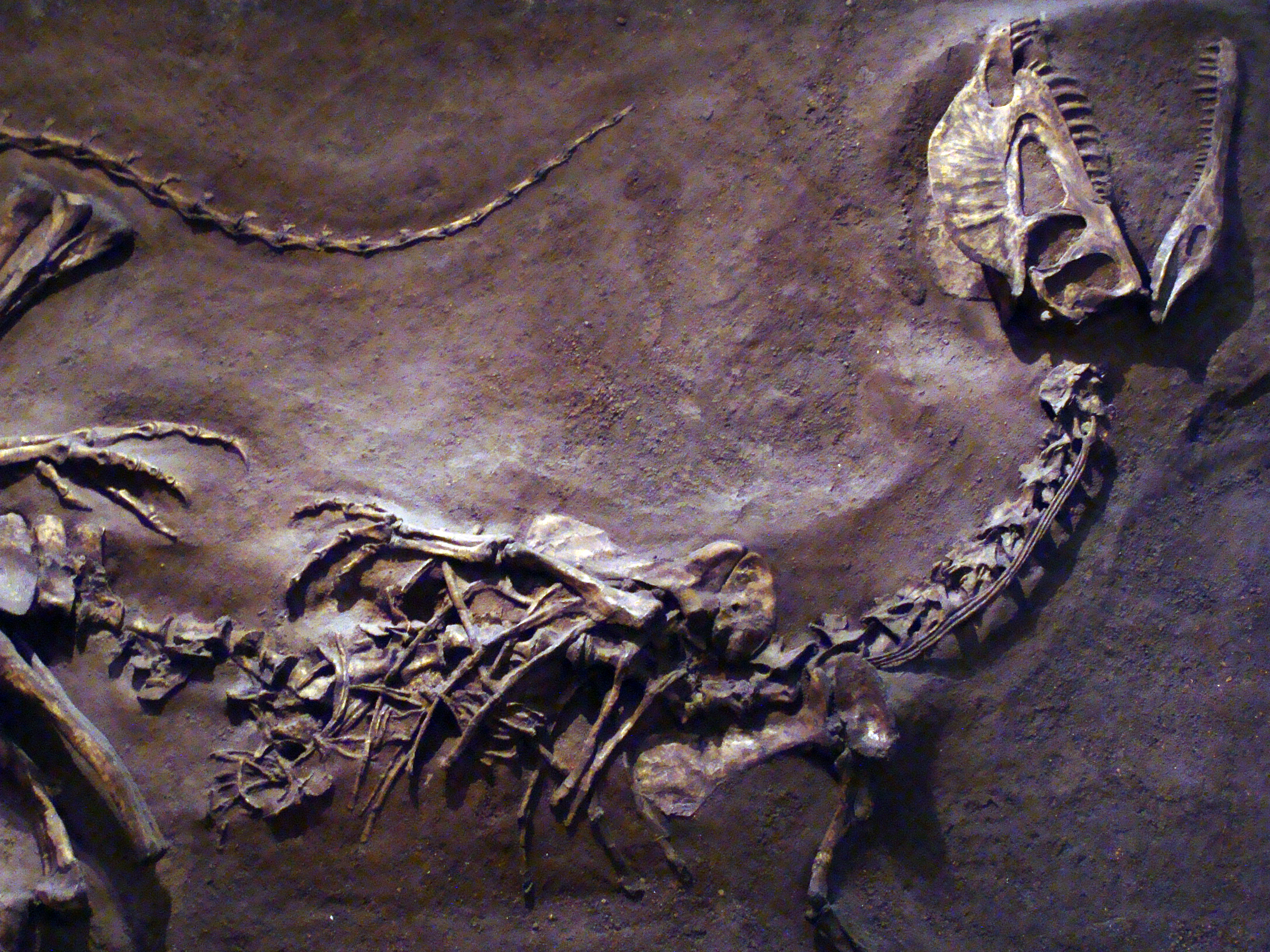
Holotype cast with recurved neck, ROM

Welles outlined the taphonomy of the original specimens, changes that happened during their decay and fossilization. The holotype skeleton was found lying on its right side, and its head and neck were recurved backwards in the "death pose" in which dinosaur skeletons are often found. This pose was thought to be opisthotonus (due to death-spasms) at the time, but may instead have been the result of how a carcass was embedded in sediments. The back was straight, and the hindmost dorsal vertebrae were turned on their left sides. The caudal vertebrae extended irregularly from the pelvis, and the legs were articulated, with little displacement. Welles concluded that the specimens were buried at the place of their deaths, without having been transported much, but that the holotype specimen appears to have been disturbed by scavengers, indicated by the rotated dorsal vertebrae and crushed skull.

Gay noted that the specimens he described in 2001 showed evidence of having been transported by a stream. As none of the specimens were complete, they may have been transported over some distance, or have lain on the surface and weathered for some time before transport. They may have been transported by a flood, as indicated by the variety of animals found as fragments and bone breakage.

== Cultural significance ==
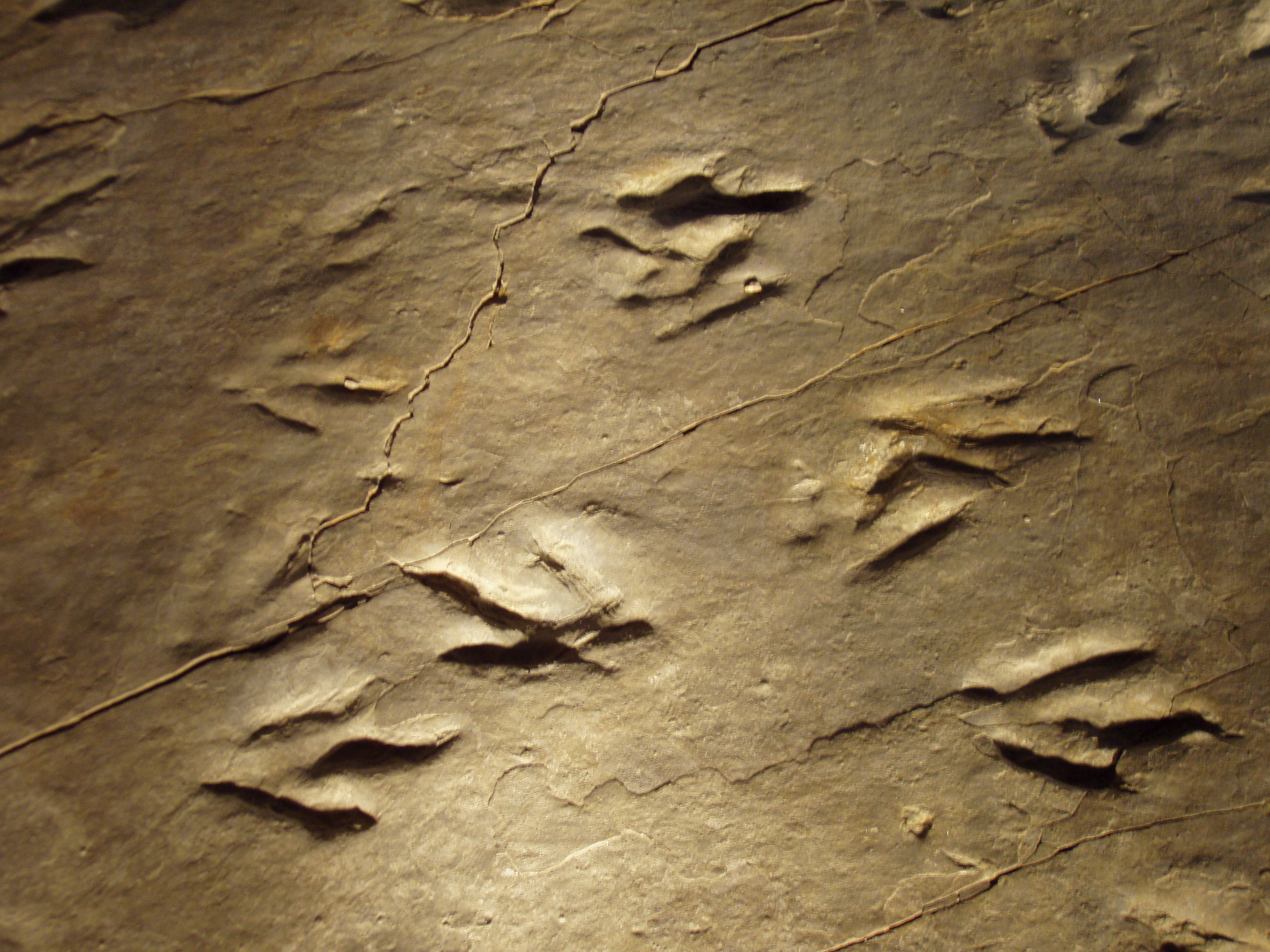
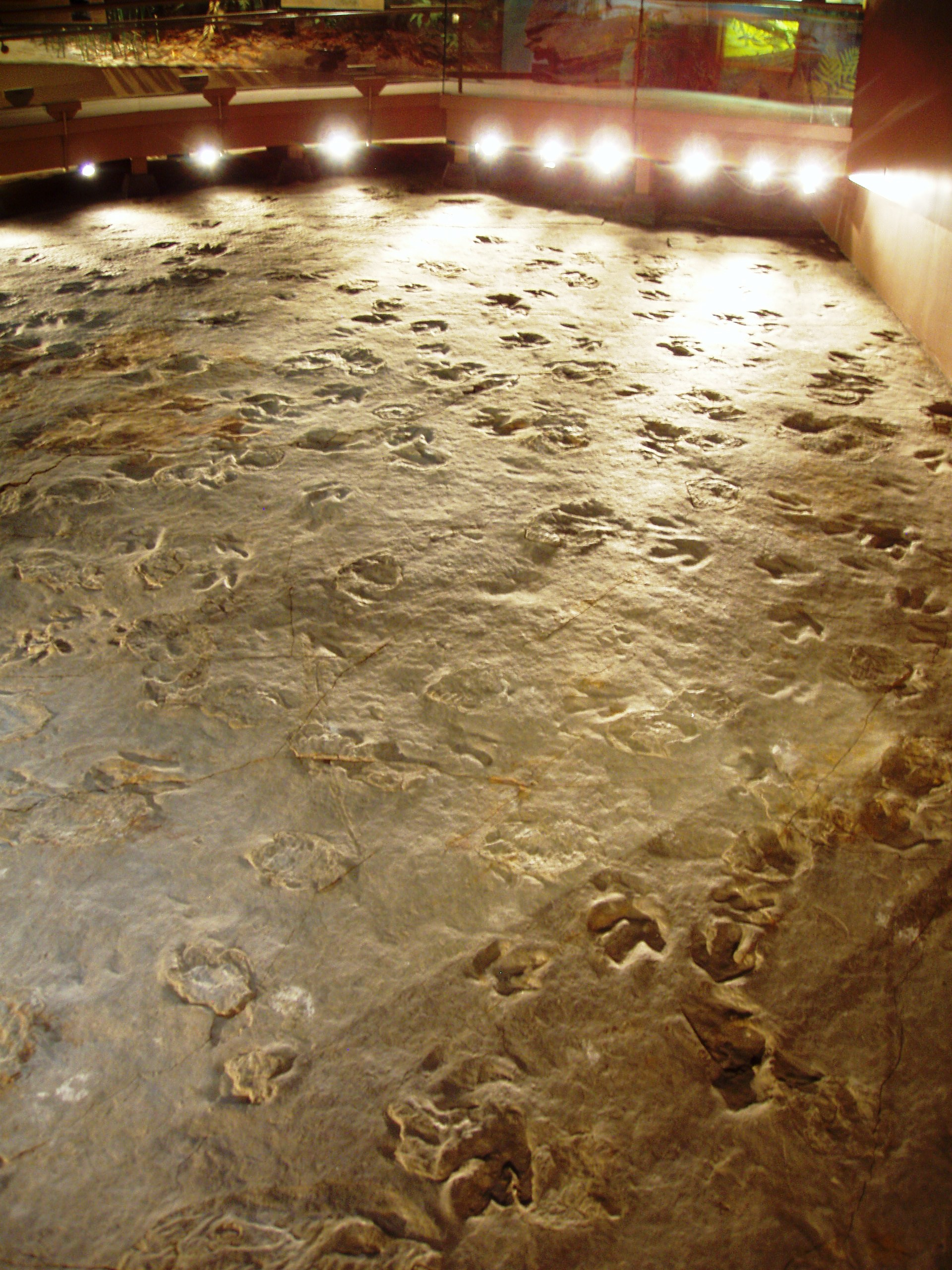
Eubrontes tracks in Dinosaur State Park, Connecticut, attributed to a dinosaur similar to Dilophosaurus; such tracks are the state's state fossil, and the reason why Dilophosaurus was designated its state dinosaur

According to Navajo myth, the carcasses of slain monsters were "beaten into the earth", but were impossible to obliterate, and fossils have traditionally been interpreted as their remains. While Navajo people have helped paleontologists locate fossils since the 19th century, traditional beliefs suggest that the ghosts of the monsters remain in their partially buried corpses, and have to be kept there through potent rituals. Likewise, some worry that the bones of their relatives would be dug up along with dinosaur remains, and that removing fossils shows disrespect to the past lives of these beings. In 2005, the historian Adrienne Mayor stated Welles had noted that during the original excavation of Dilophosaurus, the Navajo Williams disappeared from the excavation after some days, and speculated this was because Williams found the detailed work with fine brushes "beneath his dignity". Mayor instead pointed out that Navajo men do occupy themselves with detailed work, such as jewellery and painting, and that the explanation for Williams' departure may instead have been traditional anxiety as the skeletons emerged and were disturbed. Mayor also pointed to an incident in the 1940s when a Navajo man helped excavate a Pentaceratops skeleton as long as he did not have to touch the bones, but left the site when only a few inches of dirt were left covering them. In a 1994 book, Welles said Williams had come back some days later with two Navajo women saying "that's no man's work, that's squaw's work".

Restoration of Dilophosaurus leaving tracks in the Navajo Sandstone, made for National Fossil Day, 2024

The cliffs in Arizona that contained the bones of Dilophosaurus also have petroglyphs by ancestral Puebloans carved onto them, and the criss-crossing tracks of the area are called Naasho'illbahitsho Biikee by the Navajo, meaning "big lizard tracks". According to Mayor, Navajos used to hold ceremonies and make offerings to these monster tracks. Tridactyl tracks were also featured as decorations on the costumes and rock art of the Hopi and Zuni, probably influenced by such dinosaur tracks. In 2017 Dilophosaurus was designated as the state dinosaur of the US state of Connecticut, to become official with the new state budget in 2019. Dilophosaurus was chosen because tracks thought to have been made by similar dinosaurs were discovered in Rocky Hill in 1966, during excavation for the Interstate Highway 91. The six tracks were assigned to the ichnospecies Eubrontes giganteus, which was made the state fossil of Connecticut in 1991. The area they were found in had been a Triassic lake, and when the significance of the area was confirmed, the highway was rerouted, and the area made a state park named Dinosaur State Park. In 1981 a sculpture of Dilophosaurus, the first life-sized reconstruction of this dinosaur, was donated to the park.

Dilophosaurus was proposed as the state dinosaur of Arizona by a nine-year-old boy in 1998, but lawmakers suggested Sonorasaurus instead, arguing that Dilophosaurus was not unique to Arizona. A compromise was suggested that would recognize both dinosaurs, but the bill died when it was revealed that the Dilophosaurus fossils had been taken without permission from the Navajo Reservation, and because they did not reside in Arizona anymore (an 11-year-old boy again suggested Sonorasaurus as Arizona's state dinosaur in 2018). Navajo Nation officials subsequently discussed how to get the fossils returned. According to Mayor, one Navajo stated that they do not ask to get the fossils back anymore, but wondered why casts had not been made so the bones could be left, as it would be better to keep them in the ground, and a museum built so people could come to see them there. Further field work related to Dilophosaurus in the Navajo Nation was conducted with permission from the Navajo Nation Minerals Department.

=== Jurassic Park ===
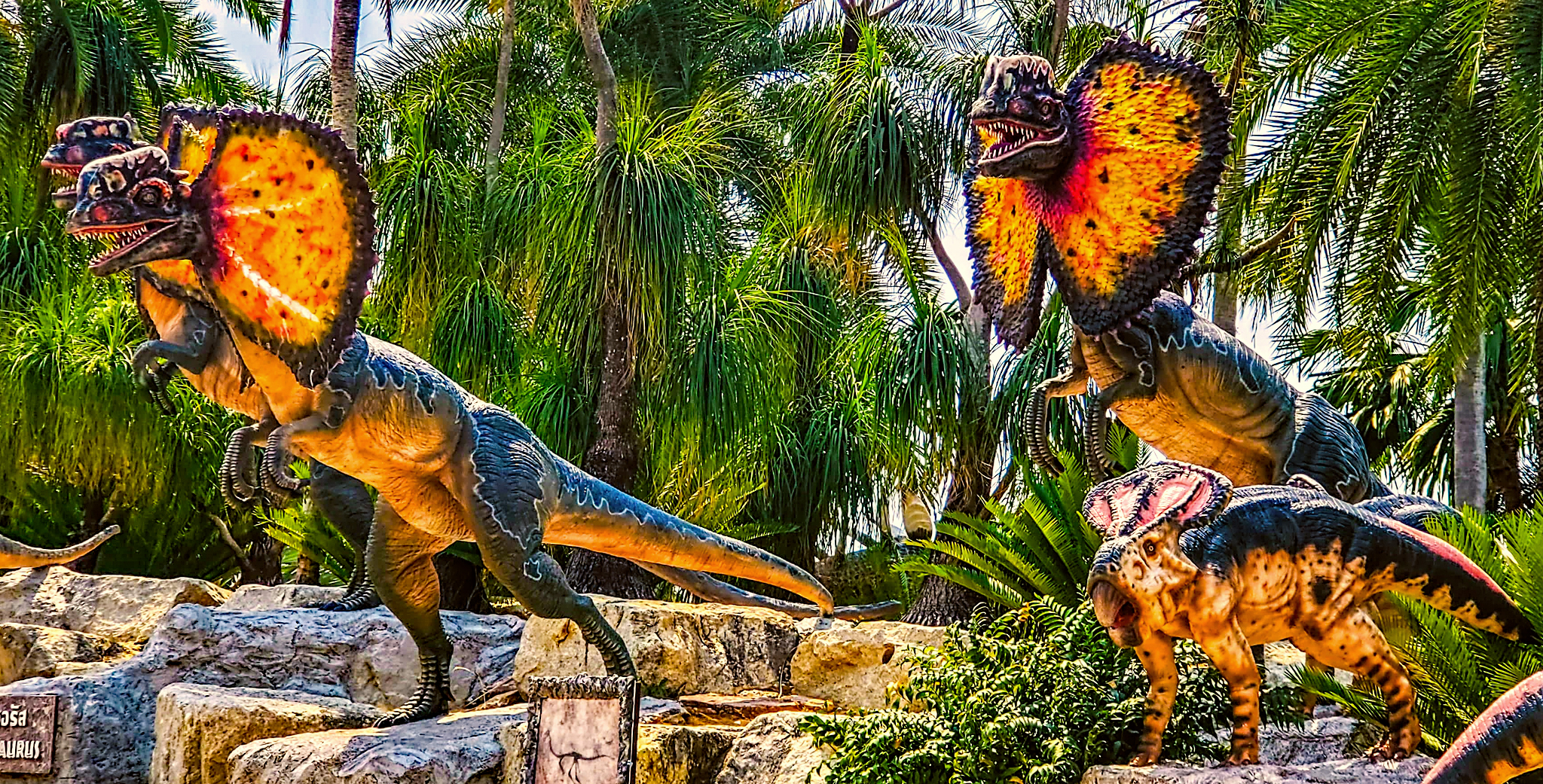
Models showing Jurassic Park style neck frills and outdated hand postures, Nong Nooch Dinosaur Valley

Dilophosaurus was featured in the 1990 novel Jurassic Park, by the writer Michael Crichton, and its 1993 movie adaptation by the director Steven Spielberg. The Dilophosaurus of Jurassic Park was acknowledged as the "only serious departure from scientific veracity" in the movie's making-of book, and as the "most fictionalized" of the movie's dinosaurs in a book about Stan Winston Studios, which created the animatronics effects. For the novel, Crichton invented the dinosaur's ability to spit venom (explaining how it was able to kill prey, in spite of its seemingly weak jaws). The art department added another feature, a neck frill or cowl folded against its neck that expanded and vibrated as the animal prepared to attack, similar to that of the frill-necked lizard. To avoid confusion with the Velociraptor as featured in the movie, Dilophosaurus was presented as only 1.2 meters (4 ft) tall, instead of its assumed true height of about 3.0 meters (10 ft). Nicknamed "the spitter", the Dilophosaurus of the movie was realized through puppeteering, and required a full body with three interchangeable heads to produce the actions required by the script. One head had its frill retracted, the second could expand and retract the frill, and the third had an extended, vibrating frill and could spit venom. Separate legs were also constructed for a shot where the dinosaur hops by. Unlike most of the other dinosaurs in the movie, no computer-generated imagery was employed when showing the Dilophosaurus.

The geologist J. Bret Bennington noted in 1996 that though Dilophosaurus probably did not have a frill and could not spit venom like in the movie, its bite could have been venomous, as has been claimed for the Komodo dragon. He found that adding venom to the dinosaur was no less allowable than giving a color to its skin, which is also unknown. If the dinosaur had a frill, there would have been evidence for this in the bones, in the shape of a rigid structure to hold up the frill, or markings at the places where the muscles used to move it were attached. He also added that if it did have a frill, it would not have used it to intimidate its meal, but rather a competitor (he speculated it may have responded to a character in the movie pulling a hood over his head). In a 1997 review of a book about the science of Jurassic Park, the paleontologist Peter Dodson likewise pointed out the wrong scale of the film's Dilophosaurus, as well as the improbability of its venom and frill. Bakker pointed out in 2014 that the movie's Dilophosaurus lacked the prominent notch in the upper jaw, and concluded that the movie-makers had done a good job at creating a frightening chimaera of different animals, but warned it could not be used to teach about the real animal. Brown and Marsh stated that while these traits were fictitious, they were made believable by being based on the biology of real animals. Welles himself was "thrilled" to see Dilophosaurus in Jurassic Park: he noted the inaccuracies, but found them minor points, enjoyed the movie, and was happy to find the dinosaur "an internationally known actor".
