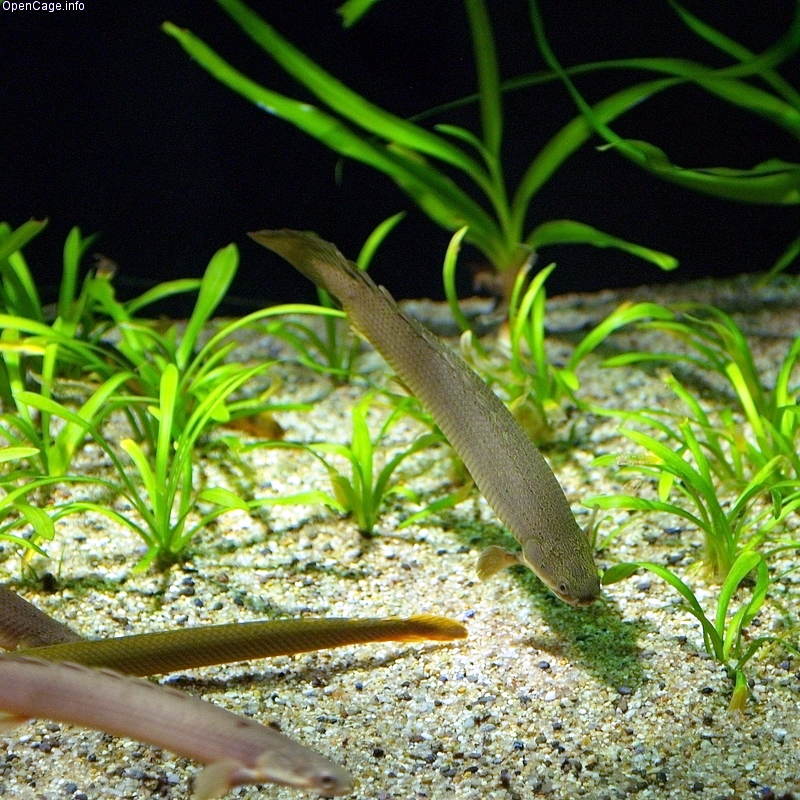
- Polypterus senegalus

Scientific classification
- Kingdom: Animalia
- Phylum: Chordata
- Class: Actinopterygii
- Subclass: Cladistia; Pander 1860 emend. Cope 1871 sensu Lund 2000

Orders
- Polypteriformes Bleeker, 1859; †Scanilepiformes Sytchevskaya, 1999; †Guildayichthyiformes? Lund, 2000

= Cladistia =

Cladistia Temporal range: Early Triassic–present (Possible Permian and Carboniferous records)

Clade of ray-finned fishes

Cladistia is a subclass of bony fishes whose only living members are the bichirs of tropical Africa. Their major synapomorphies are a dorsal fin with independent rays, and a posteriorly elongated parasphenoid.

Cladistia are the earliest diverging branch of living Actinopterygii, and are thought to have diverged from the Actinopteri, the group which includes all other living ray finned fish, by the Carboniferous. However, the fossil range for the only extant order (Polypteriformes) is comparatively young, only reaching as far back as the mid-Cretaceous of South America and Africa, and the two extant genera of bichir only diverged around the Miocene.

Aside from bichirs, other extinct fish groups thought to be members of the group include the Scanilepiformes, known from Triassic (and possibly Permian) of the Northern Hemisphere. The Guildayichthyiformes of Carboniferous North America are also sometimes considered cladistians, but this is thought to be dubious, with other authorities placing them as a stem-group to Neopterygii.

== Taxonomy ==
Based on work done by Near et al (2017) and Lund (2000):

- Order Polypteriformes Bleeker 1859
  - Genus †Latinopollia Meunier and Gayet 1998
    - Species †Latinopollia suarezi (Meunier & Gayet 1996) Meunier & Gayet 1998
  - Genus †Dagetella Gayet & Meunier 1991
    - Species †Dagetella sudamericana Gayet & Meunier 1991
  - Genus †Bartschichthys Gayet & Meunier 1996 [Bartschia Gayet & Meunier 1996 non Rehder 1943]
    - Species †B. arnoulti (Gayet & Meunier 1996) [Bartschia arnoulti Gayet & Meunier 1996]
    - Species †B. napatensis Werner & Gayet 1997
    - Species †B. tubularis (Gayet & Meunier 1996) [Bartschia tubularis Gayet & Meunier 1996]
  - Genus †Sudania Werner & Gayet 1997
    - Species †S. gracilis Werner & Gayet 1997
    - Species †S. oblonga Werner & Gayet 1997
  - Genus †Saharichthys Werner & Gayet 1997
    - Species †S. nigeriensis (Gayet & Meunier 1996) [Sainthilairia nigeriensis Gayet & Meunier 1996]
    - Species †S. africanus (Gayet & Meunier 1996) [Sainthilairia africana Gayet & Meunier 1996]
  - Genus †Sainthilairia Gayet & Meunier 1996
    - Species †S. beccussiformis Gayet & Meunier 1996
    - Species †S. elongata Werner & Gayet 1997
    - Species †S. falciformis Gayet & Meunier 1996
    - Species †S. grandis Gayet & Meunier 1996
    - Species †S. intermedia Werner & Gayet 1997
  - Genus †Inbecetemia Werner & Gayet 1997
    - Species †I. torta (Gayet & Meunier 1996) [Sainthilairia torta Gayet & Meunier 1996]
    - Species †I. tortissima (Gayet & Meunier 1996) [Sainthilairia tortissima Gayet & Meunier 1996]
  - Genus †Nagaia Werner & Gayet 1997
    - Species †Nagaia extrema Werner & Gayet 1997
  - Family Polypteridae Lacépède 1803 sensu stricto
    - Genus †Bawitius Grandstaff et al. 2012
      - Species †Bawitius bartheli (Schaal 1984) Grandstaff et al. 2012 [Polypterus bartheli Schaal 1984]
    - Genus †Serenoichthys Dutheil 1999
      - Species †Serenoichthys kemkemensis Dutheil 1999
    - Genus Erpetoichthys Smith 1865 [Calamoichthys Smith 1866]
      - Species Erpetoichthys calabaricus
    - Genus Polypterus Lacepède 1803
      - Species Polypterus ansorgii Boulenger, 1910
      - Species Polypterus bichir Lacépède, 1803
      - Species Polypterus congicus Boulenger, 1898
      - Species Polypterus delhezi Boulenger, 1899
      - Species Polypterus endlicherii Heckel, 1847
      - Species Polypterus mokelembembe Schliewen & Schäfer, 2006
      - Species Polypterus ornatipinnis Boulenger, 1902
      - Species Polypterus palmas Ayres, 1850
      - Species Polypterus polli J. P. Gosse, 1988
      - Species Polypterus retropinnis Vaillant, 1899
      - Species Polypterus senegalus Cuvier, 1829
      - Species Polypterus teugelsi Britz, 2004
      - Species Polypterus weeksii Boulenger, 1898
- Order †Scanilepiformes Sytchevskaya, 1999
  - Genus †Beishanichthys Xu and Gao, 2011
    - Species †Beishanichthys brevicaudalis Xu and Gao, 2011
  - Genus †Fukangichthys Su, 1978
    - Species †Fukangichthys longidorsalis Su, 1978
  - Genus †Mizhilepis Liu & Shen, 2006
    - Species †Mizhilepis zhangyaensis Liu & Shen, 2006
  - Genus †Tanaocrossus Schaeffer, 1967
    - Species †Tanaocrossus kalliokoskii Schaeffer, 1967
  - Family †Scanilepididae Aldinger, 1935
    - Genus †Scanilepis Aldinger, 1935
      - Species †Scanilepis dubius (Woodward, 1893)
      - ?Species †Scanilepis spitzbergensis Aldinger, 1935
  - Family †Evenkiidae Selezneva, 1985
    - Genus †Evenkia Berg, 1941
      - Species †Evenkia eunotoptera Berg, 1941
    - Genus †Oshiaichthys Schultze et al., 2021
      - Species †Oshiaichthys ferganica Schultze et al., 2021
    - Genus †Toyemia Minikh, 1990
      - Species †Toyemia blumentalis Minikh, 1995
      - Species †Toyemia tverdochlebovi Minikh, 1990

=== Disputed members ===
- Order †Guildayichthyiformes Lund 2000
  - Family †Guildayichthyidae Lund 2000
    - Genus †Guildayichthys Lund 2000
      - Species †Guildayichthys carnegiei Lund 2000
    - Genus †Discoserra Lund 2000
      - Species †Discoserra pectinodon Lund 2000

== See also ==
- Orexin, a hormone found in most vertebrates, including cladistia, suggesting an ancestral link
