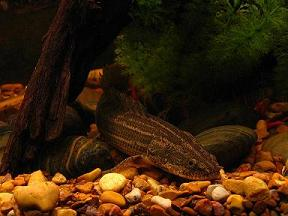

Scientific classification
- Domain: Eukaryota
- Kingdom: Animalia
- Phylum: Chordata
- Class: Actinopterygii
- Order: Polypteriformes
- Family: Polypteridae
- Genus: Polypterus
- Species: P. bichir
- Subspecies: P. b. lapradei

Trinomial name
- Polypterus bichir lapradei Steindachner, 1869

Synonyms
- Polypterus bichir lapradii Steindachner, 1869; Polypterus lapradei (non Steindachner, 1869)

= Polypterus bichir lapradei =

Subspecies of fish

Polypterus bichir lapradei is a subspecies of freshwater fish in the family Polypteridae. P. bichir lapradei are demersal, primitive, and popular with experienced aquarists.

== Morphology ==
Polypterus bichir lapradei is visually similar to its close relative, Polypterus bichir. Its body is elongated and subcylindrical, and covered in ganoid scales. As its name suggests (Poly = "many" and -terus = "finned"), P. bichir lapradei's most striking asset is the row of dorsal finlets along its back. These finlets, which can number up to 15 in some specimens, constitute a single dorsal fin. This fin is divided by rigid spines, which can be raised or lowered at will (often in response to a threat, or for stability).

This is a "lower jaw" bichir, meaning that its lower jaw is somewhat longer than its upper jaw (i.e. an underbite). Other "lower jaw" bichir species include P. endlicherii and P. ansorgii. A commonly encountered "upper jaw" species is P. senegalus.

They have prominent external nostrils, which they use to great effect in compensating for their relatively weak eyesight.

Polypterus bichir lapradei's coloration and patterning varies quite a bit region-to-region, but certain characteristics are almost always present. These include:

- Dark, longitudinal bands, punctuated by irregular, vertical stripes.
- Grayish green lateral and dorsal scales.
- Grey to white ventral coloration.

These bichirs use a coordinated network of fins for locomotion. Their pectoral fins are used for general navigation---they help the fish turn, "brake", and "walk" across the bottom of their environment. When held rigid, the pectoral fins are strong enough to allow for short-distance travel across dry land. The ventral fins act as a keel would on a ship, keeping the bichir's subcylindrical body level. The caudal fin, which connects directly to the dorsal fin, is the fish's primary means of propulsion. Although not a particularly fast species, P. bichir lapradei is capable of achieving quick bursts in pursuit of its prey (usually by folding all of its fins tightly against its body, and vigorously thrusting its caudal fin).

Bichirs are sexually dimorphic; the males are characterized by a fleshy, wide anal fin, while the females' anal fin is thin and "sharp."

One of the most interesting characteristics of this (and every) bichir is the presence of a modified swim bladder, which has evolved into a primitive lung structure. The "lung" is divided into two sections, and enables the bichirs to supplement their oxygen intake by taking gulps at the surface of the water. This function has enabled them to survive in a great variety of water conditions. It also enables them to survive out of water, albeit for relatively brief periods of time.

Polypterus bichir lapradei is a fairly large bichir species, reaching around 30" total length in adulthood.

== Distribution ==
As with all of the bichir species, P. bichir lapradei is endemic to Africa, where it can be found inhabiting numerous river systems throughout the continent.
