= Scanilepis =

Scanilepis Temporal range: Rhaetian-Hettangian ~203–199 Ma

Scientific classification
- Kingdom: Animalia
- Phylum: Chordata
- Class: Actinopterygii
- Order: †Scanilepiformes
- Family: †Scanilepididae; Aldinger, 1935
- Genus: †Scanilepis; Aldinger, 1935

Type species
- †Gyrolepis dubius Woodward, 1893

Other species
- †S. spitzbergensis Aldinger, 1935 (nomen nudum)

Synonyms
- †Gyrolepis dubius Woodward, 1893

Extinct genus of fishes

Scanilepis is an extinct genus of prehistoric bony fish that lived during the Rhaetian-?Hettangian ages (Late Triassic-?Lower Jurassic boundary). The type species, S. dubia, is known from the Rhaetian freshwater deposits of the Bjuv member of the Höganäs Formation, southwestern Sweden. A second species, S. spitzbergensis was mentioned from the Hettangian of the Festning section of the Grøfjorden area in Spitsbergen, Norway but was never described.

== Description ==
The original material of this genus, described by Aldinger in 1937, was destroyed during WW2 in Germany. Latter, new material was recovered from Bjuv locality, including skull and postcraneal material. This taxon represents a relatively large fish, up to 110 cm, with an isolated isolated caudal suggesting a fish of at least 2 m. The head presents unusual relative small eyes and a correlative maxilla with very large posterior plate and bony craneal top. This taxon presents a relatively elongated bodyplan with an odd dorsal fin, exceptionally long, beginning behind the head and reaching the caudal. Pectoral fins weren't found, and are assumed to be small and only played a reduced role.

== Classification ==
This fish was originally identified as a member of the genus Gyrolepis, as Gyrolepis dubius, but was later assigned to its own genus (Scanilepis) and family (Scanilepididae), and classified as a member of Palaeonisciformes. Later works placed it as a taxon close to the origin of the family Amiidae, until it was found later to belong to its own order, Scanilepiformes, closely related with the genus Evenkia. Regarding to the microstructure of its scales, Scanilepis approaches the condition of Polypterus or Erpetoichthys more than any other genera.

== See also ==
- Prehistoric fish
- List of prehistoric bony fish
