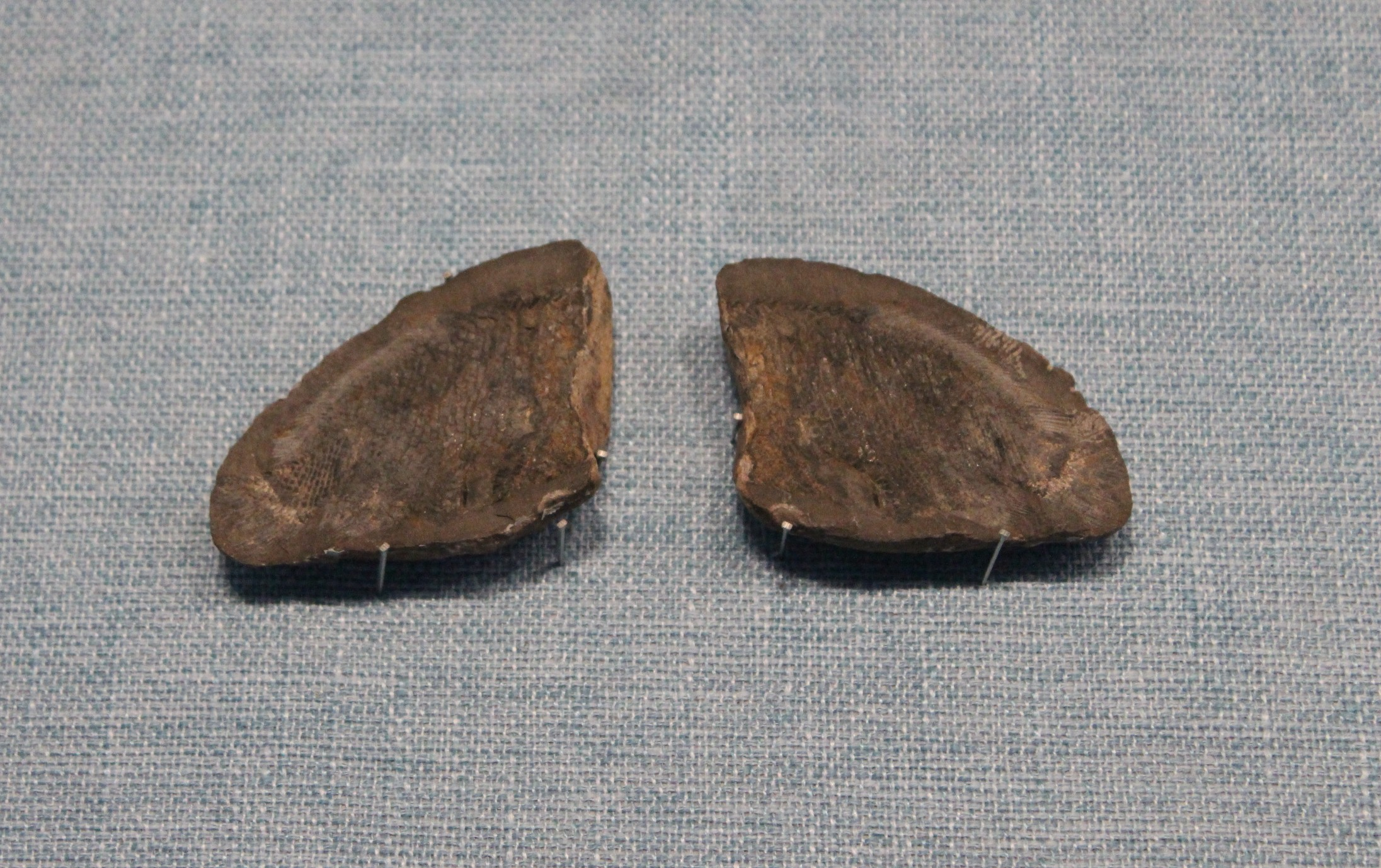
- Fossil specimen at the Baoding Natural History Museum

Scientific classification
- Kingdom: Animalia
- Phylum: Chordata
- Class: Actinopterygii
- Order: †Scanilepiformes
- Genus: †Fukangichthys; Su, 1978
- Species: †F. longidorsalis

Binomial name
- †Fukangichthys longidorsalis Su, 1978

= Fukangichthys =

Fukangichthys Temporal range: Anisian

Extinct genus of fishes

Fukangichthys is an extinct genus of prehistoric freshwater ray-finned fish that lived during the Middle Triassic epoch. It contains a single species, F. longidorsalis from the Anisian-aged Kelamayi Formation of Xinjiang, China. It is a member of the Scanilepiformes, a group of basal ray-finned fish that were previously placed in the Neopterygii, but are now generally thought to be cladistians related to the modern bichirs.

== See also ==
- Prehistoric fish
- List of prehistoric bony fish
