= Tanaocrossus =

Tanaocrossus Temporal range: Carnian–Rhaetian

Scientific classification
- Kingdom: Animalia
- Phylum: Chordata
- Class: Actinopterygii
- Order: †Scanilepiformes
- Genus: †Tanaocrossus; Schaeffer, 1967
- Species: †T. kalliokoskii

Binomial name
- †Tanaocrossus kalliokoskii Schaeffer, 1967

Extinct genus of fishes

Tanaocrossus (Ancient Greek for "outstretched fringe", referring to its distinctive dorsal fin) is an extinct genus of primitive freshwater ray-finned fish that inhabited southwestern and eastern North America during the Late Triassic period. It contains a single known species, T. kalliokoskii, known from the United States, with indeterminate species also known.

It is primarily known from the Norian to Rhaetian of the Chinle Formation of Colorado and Utah. Indeterminate remains are known from the Dockum Group of Texas and New Mexico (Bull Canyon Formation). A single fragmentary but distinctive fossilized fin from the earlier Carnian-aged Doswell Formation of Virginia, which shares the genus's distinctive fin rays, was long the only record from the eastern United States, but a partial specimen was also later identified from the Manassas Sandstone.

Morphologically, it can be easily distinguished from other co-occurring fishes by its highly elongated dorsal fin that stretches across its body. Its taxonomic affiliations have long been enigmatic since its description due to its unusual morphology. More recent studies have found it to be a scanilepiform, an enigmatic order of fish which were later found to most likely be basal cladistians, which would make it a distant relative of modern bichirs. A 2008 study questioned this assignment and instead reclassified it to the Perleidiformes, but this has been disputed by later studies.

It was likely a slow-moving fish that inhabited quiet waters, with its dorsal fin allowing for undulation while swimming.
