= Bawitius =

Bawitius Temporal range: Late Cretaceous, 99.7–94.3 Ma
- Restoration of Bawitius

Scientific classification
- Domain: Eukaryota
- Kingdom: Animalia
- Phylum: Chordata
- Class: Actinopterygii
- Order: Polypteriformes
- Family: Polypteridae
- Genus: †Bawitius; Grandstaff et al. 2012
- Species: †B. bartheli

Binomial name
- †Bawitius bartheli Grandstaff et al. 2012, (Schaal, 1984)

Synonyms
- Polypterus bartheli Schaal, 1984

Extinct genus of fishes

Bawitius is an extinct genus of giant polypterid from the Upper Cretaceous (lower Cenomanian) Bahariya Formation of Egypt. The type species is B. bartheli, named as a species of Polypterus in 1984, and the genus etymology comes from Bawiti, the principal settlement of the Bahariya Oasis in Egypt. It is known from the holotype TU-B SFB 69 Vb 003 (= Bah 5/12-016): left ectopterygoid scales and some sparse scales.

== Morphology ==
Compared to modern polypterids, Bawitius was enormous: the Bawitius holotype ectopterygoid is five times larger than the one of Polypterus and the scales are unusually large, too: these remains suggest the living animal may have been up to 300 centimeters (9.8 feet) in length.

The morphology of Bawitius is different enough to justify its assignment to a new genus apart from Polypterus. Unique features of the genus are, for example, an anterioposteriorly elongated contact between the lateral process and the maxilla, a high, narrow ectopterygoid and the presence of 14 teeth in the main tooth row.

The scales are different, too, apart from size, from those of modern polypterids: they feature a discontinuous ganoine layer, a rectilinear shape, and small articular processes.

== Ecological relevance ==
The existence of drastically different polypterids such as Bawitius and Serenoichthys corroborates the existence of a variety of polypterid fishes in the ecosystems of Late Cretaceous of North Africa and Brazil.
