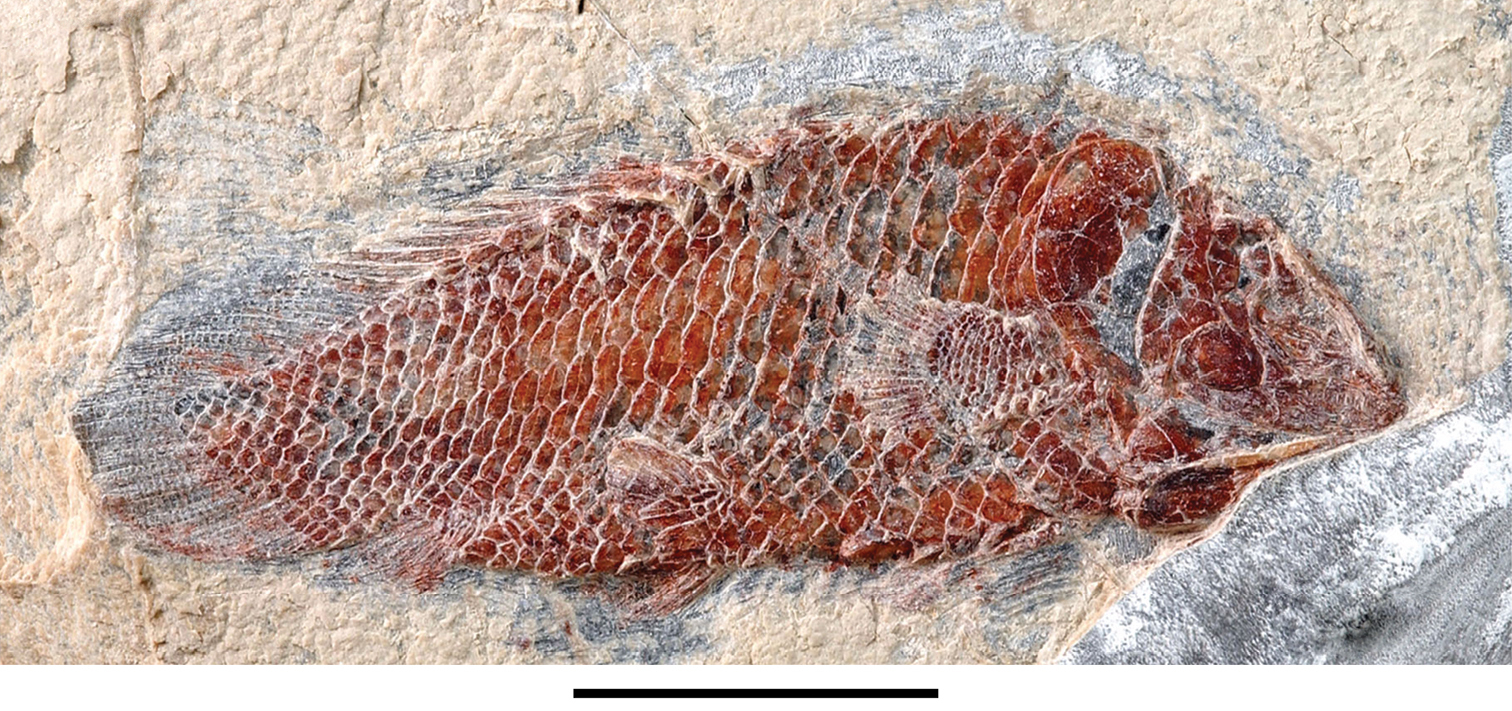
- Fossil specimen (scale bar 1 cm)

Scientific classification
- Kingdom: Animalia
- Phylum: Chordata
- Class: Actinopterygii
- Order: Polypteriformes
- Family: Polypteridae
- Genus: †Serenoichthys; D. B. Dutheil, 1999
- Species: †S. kemkemensis

Binomial name
- †Serenoichthys kemkemensis D. B. Dutheil, 1999

= Serenoichthys =

Serenoichthys Temporal range: Cenomanian

Extinct genus of fishes

Serenoichthys is an extinct genus of small bichir from the Late Cretaceous (Cenomanian) of southeastern Morocco. The genus is monotypic, the type and only species being Serenoichthys kemkemensis. Only known at first from postcranial skeletons, complete specimens were later discovered.

== Etymology ==
The generic name Serenoichthys (Sereno's fish) was given after the leader of the team responsible for the discovery, Paul C. Sereno. The species name, kemkemensis, refers to the Kem Kem locality in Morocco where the fossils were discovered.

== Description ==
Serenoichthys was comparatively small, with the fossils discovered reaching at most 5 cm (2.0 in) in length — in comparaison, the contemporary polypterid Bawitius could reach up to 300 cm (9.8 ft). Its body was relatively short and tall compared to modern polypterids, closer to the original actinopterygian body plan.

Like modern-day polypterids, Serenoichthys possessed a dorsal fin divided into a series of independent finlets each supported by a spine, a defining synapomorphy of the Cladistia.
