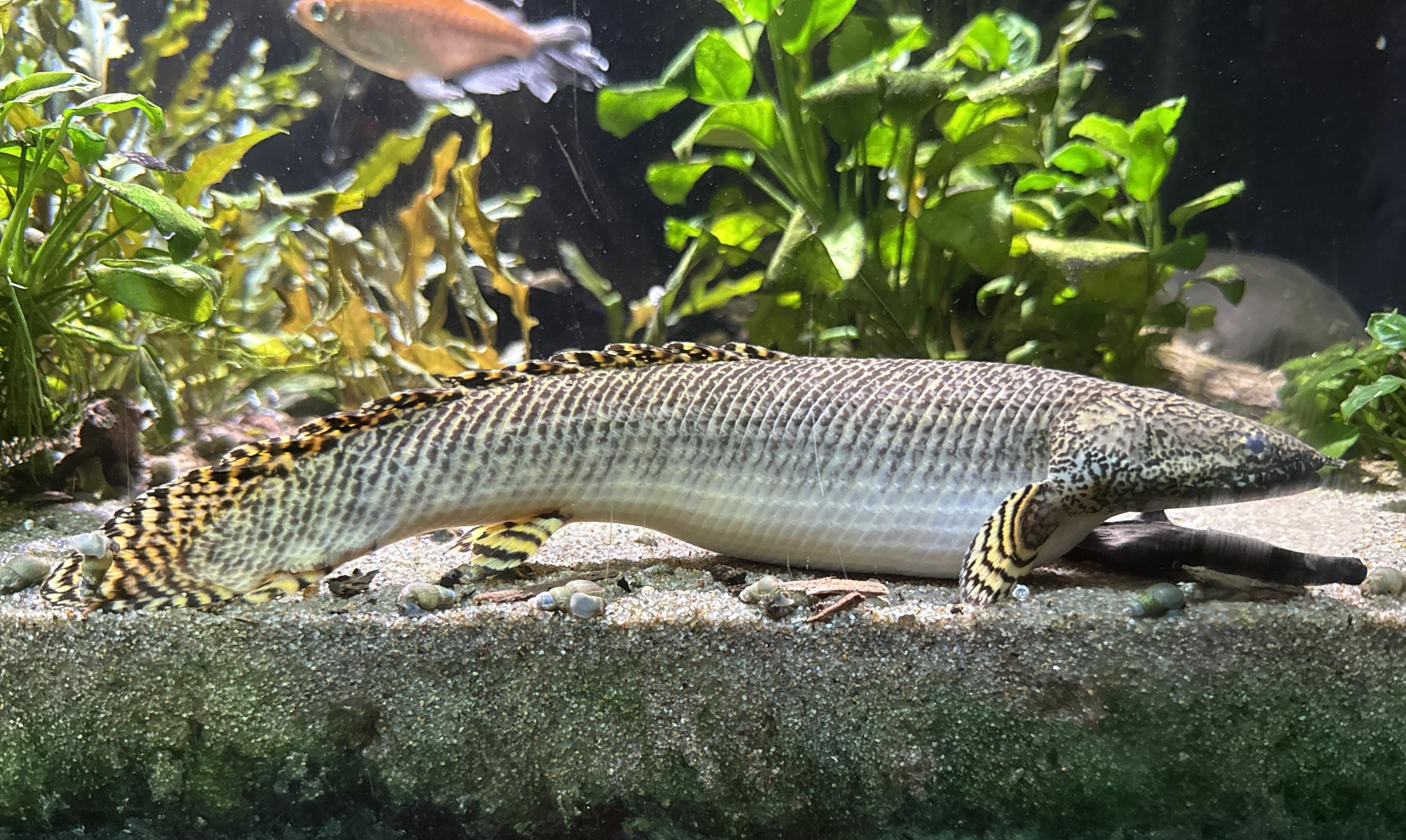
- At the Vancouver Aquarium
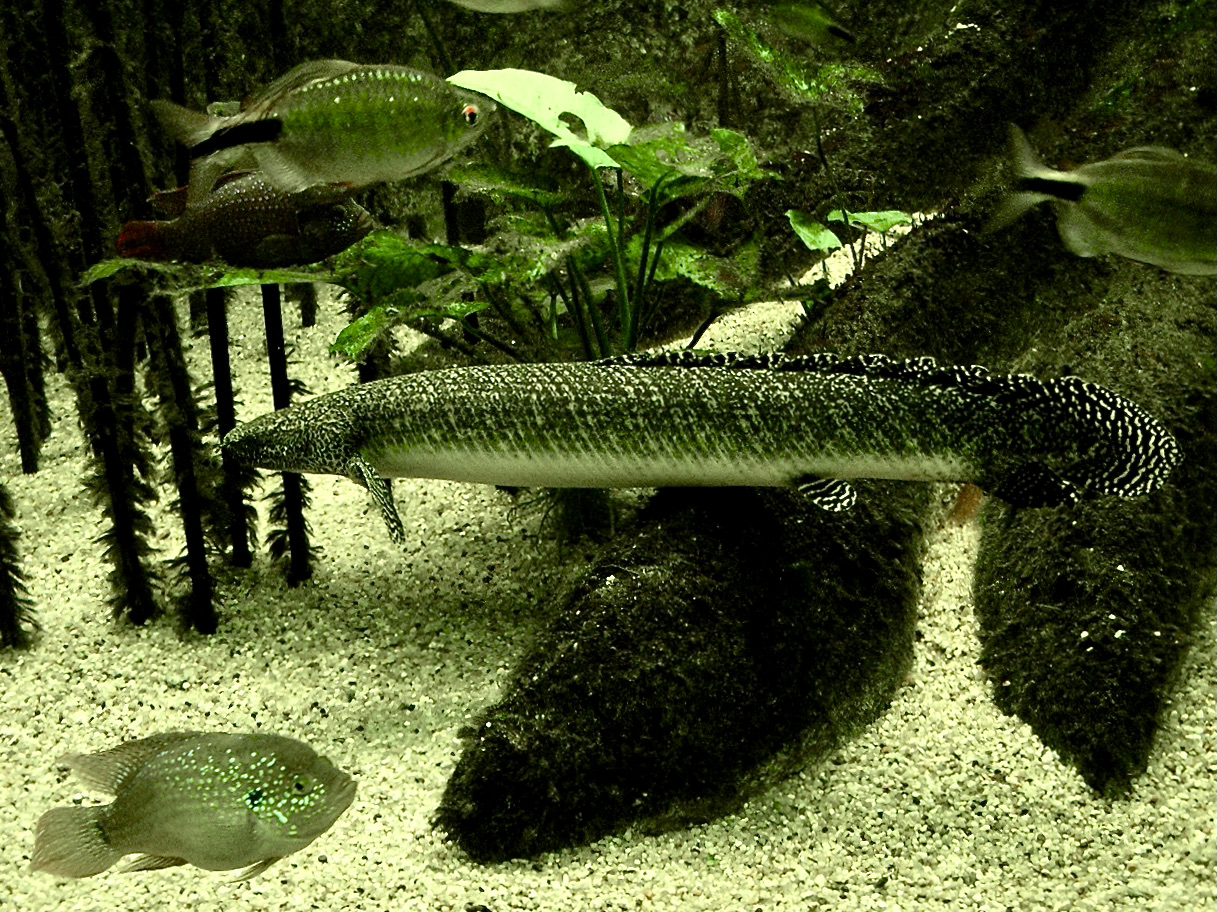
- At the Wilhelma Zoological Garden, Stuttgart.

Conservation status
- Least Concern (IUCN 3.1)

Scientific classification
- Kingdom: Animalia
- Phylum: Chordata
- Class: Actinopterygii
- Order: Polypteriformes
- Family: Polypteridae
- Genus: Polypterus
- Species: P. ornatipinnis

Binomial name
- Polypterus ornatipinnis Boulenger, 1902
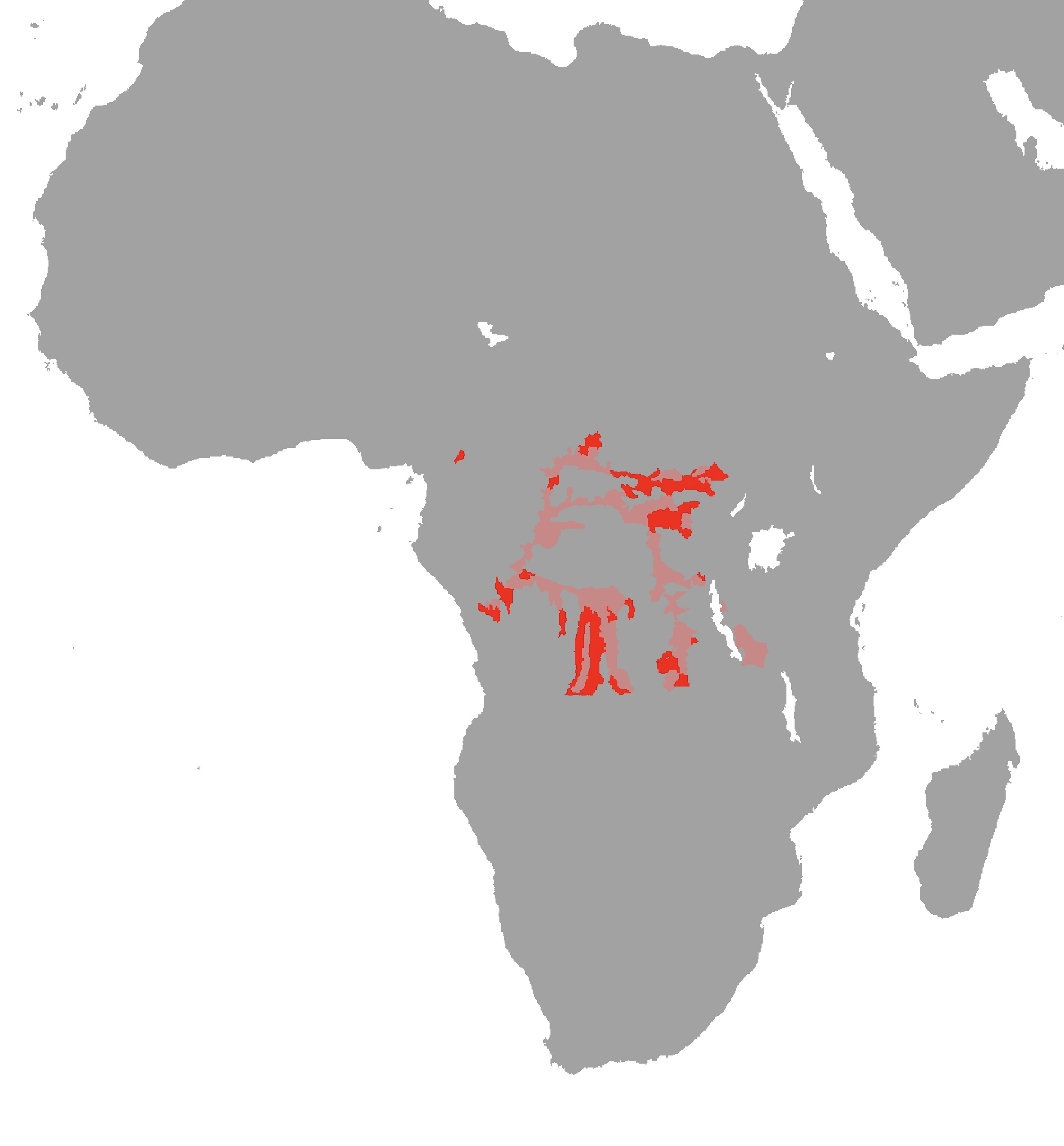

= Polypterus ornatipinnis =

Species of fish

Polypterus ornatipinnis, the ornate bichir, is a bony fish of the family Polypteridae found in Lake Tanganyika and the Congo River basin in Central and East Africa. It is known from the Central African Republic, the Democratic Republic of the Congo, and Tanzania.

== Description ==
P. ornatipinnis has black and yellow patterning on its body, head, and fins, with 9 to 11 dorsal spines. It is the largest of the "upper jaw bichirs", and reaches 60 cm (24 in) in length. (Other larger bichir species such as Polypterus congicus do not have a clearly protruding upper jaw.) This fish can range in colour from dark brown to brownish grey, and is very common in the aquarium trade, like many other bichirs. This fish has a primitive pair of lungs, enabling it to breathe air in hypoxic waters and even survive out of water for extended periods of time. It has eyes on the sides on its head and two pectoral fins, and is considered to be one of the more attractive of the bichirs.
