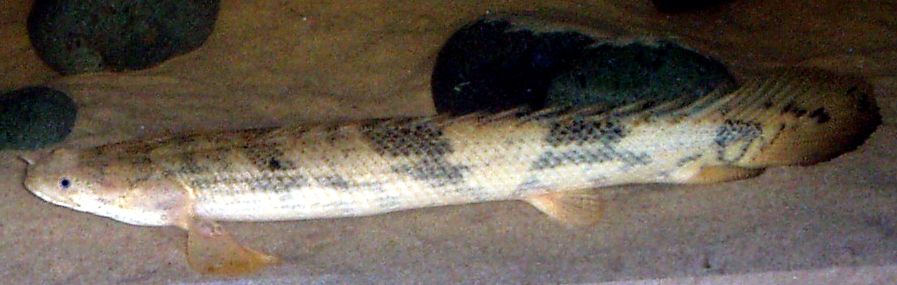

Conservation status
- Least Concern (IUCN 3.1)

Scientific classification
- Kingdom: Animalia
- Phylum: Chordata
- Class: Actinopterygii
- Order: Polypteriformes
- Family: Polypteridae
- Genus: Polypterus
- Species: P. endlicherii

Binomial name
- Polypterus endlicherii Heckel, 1847
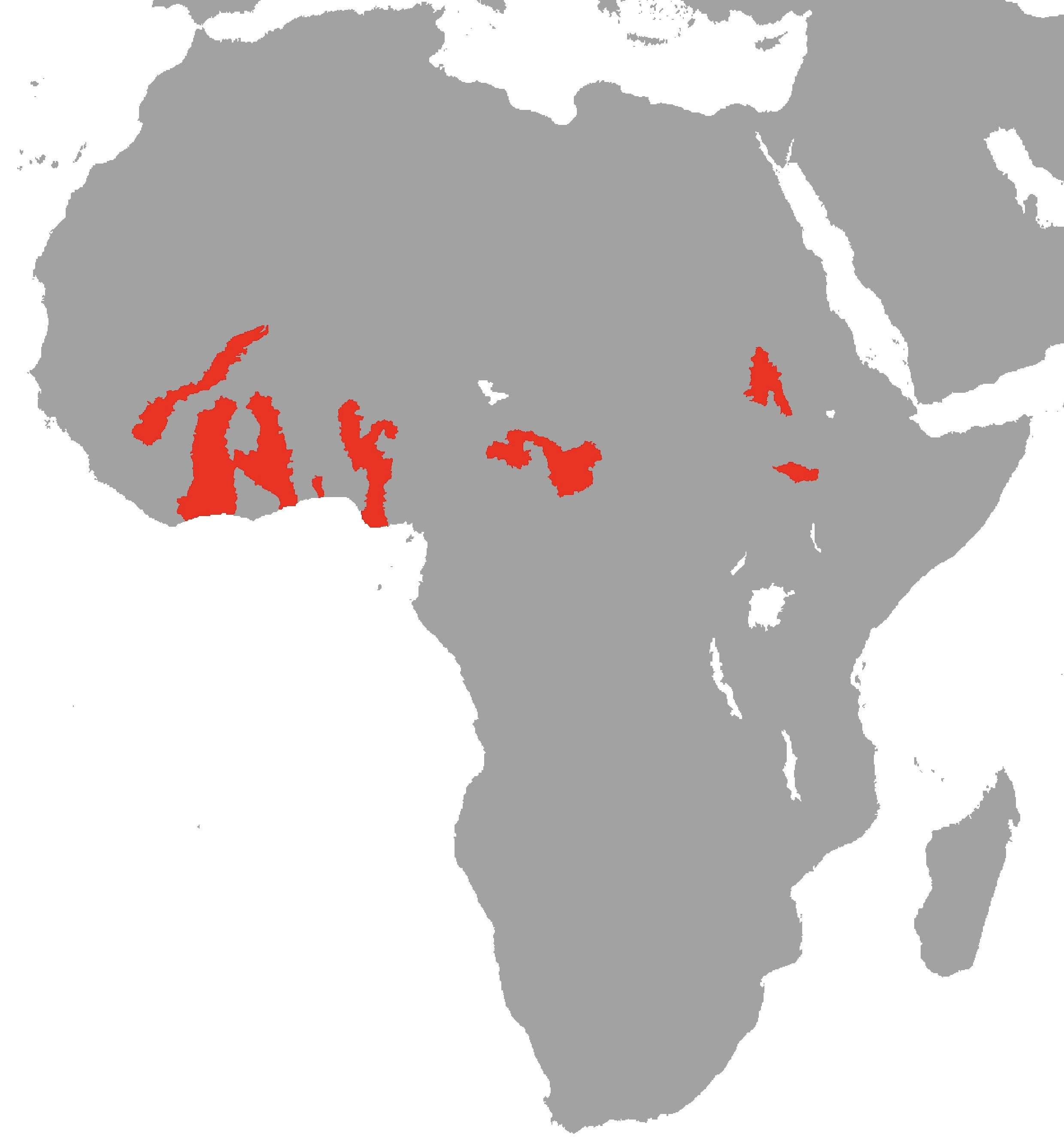

Synonyms
- Polypterus endlicheri endlicheri Heckel 1847

= Polypterus endlicherii =

Species of fish

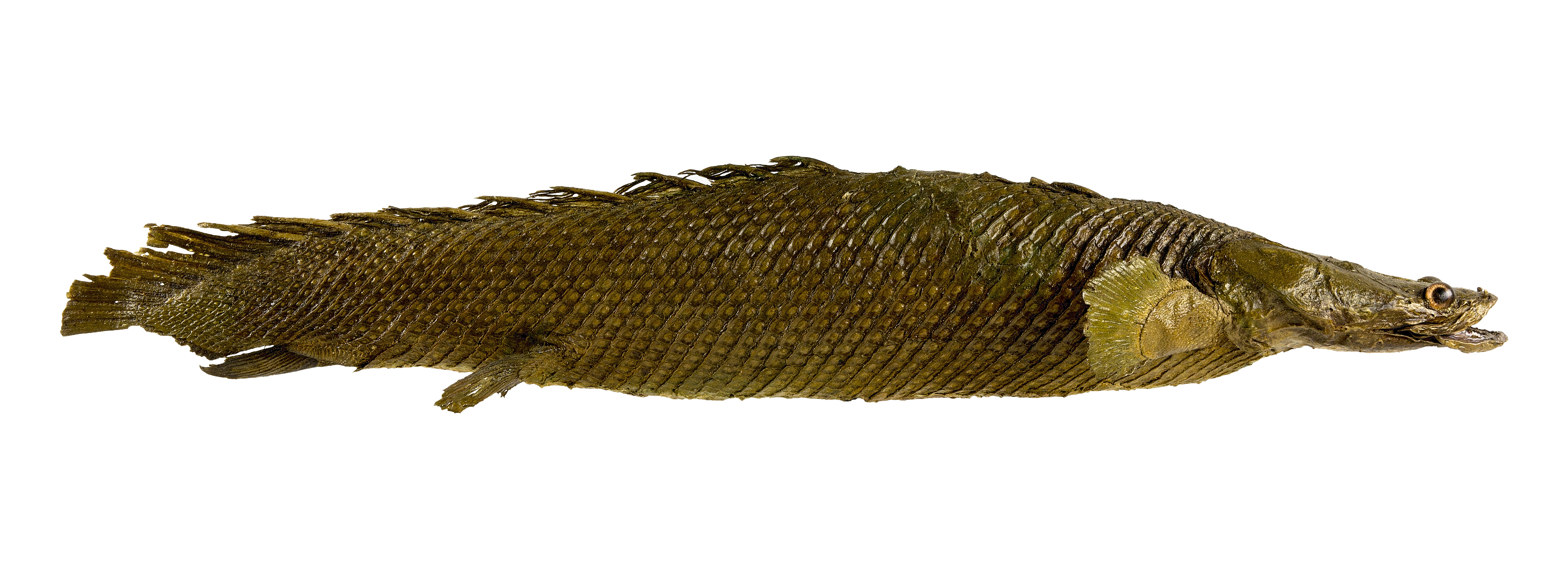
Polypterus endlicherii - MHNT

Polypterus endlicheri, the saddled bichir, is one of the fourteen extant species in the Polypteridae family. Polypterus comes from the Greek words poly and pteron, roughly translating to "many finned", while endlicheri is derived from the Austrian botanist Stephen Endlicher, who first identified the fish from a collection at the Naturhistorisches Museum in Vienna. The common name, saddled bichir, comes from the saddle-like patterns that line the dorsal side of the fish. P. endlicheri has also earned nicknames such as "dragonfin" or the "dinosaur bichir" because of its prehistoric appearance.

== Taxonomy ==
Polypterus endlicheri belongs to the order Polypteriformes and the family Polypteridae. The family was once heavily represented from the Devonian to the Cretaceous but now consists of two genera, Polypterus and Erpetoichthys. Historically, scientists have had trouble assigning Polypteridae to a specific taxonomic group. Shared traits such as gilled larvae, ganoid scales, and a modified heterocercal tail suggest a close relationship to multiple extant ancestral groups such as Chondrostei and Holostei. However, unique features such as their specialized dorsal, caudal, and paired fins separate them from these groups. Via genetic sequencing, as well as study of the jaw structure and early development, scientists have placed bichirs as some of the first ray-finned fishes to diverge from modern teleosts. In the early 2000s, after much debate, taxonomists began to widely recognize Polypteriforms as their own monophyletic group called Cladistia, a subclass first named by Christian Heindrich Pandor in 1860 based on fossil records. Cladistia is a sister group to Chondrostei and Neopterygii.

== Description ==
Polypterus endlicheri are long, slender, fusiform fish. On average, adults grow to lengths between 24 and 30 inches (61 and 76 cm), with females typically growing larger than males. The maximum recorded weight was about 3.3 kg (7.3 lb). P. endlicheri are some of the largest growing bichirs in the Polypteridae family with only Polypterus congicus, once believed to be a subspecies of P. endlicheri, growing larger.

They predominantly possess a tannish yellow color with four to six striking black bands running vertically from the dorsal toward the ventral. These bands may become splotchy along the lateral and ventral sides. Black spots or vermiculation may be found on the head and fins. P. endlicheri have relatively flat heads with a mouth that does not extend past the anterior third of the head, and a lower jaw that projects slightly beyond the upper jaw.

Polypterus are easily identified by the series of dorsal finlets that run along the top of the fish, replacing a true dorsal fin. P. endlicheri possesses between 11 and 14 dorsal finlets, the first of which starts 11–15 scales behind the occiput. Each finlet consists of a single bifid spine along with five to nine articulated rays which protrude horizontally from the spine. Connected to the dorsal finlets is a large, rounded caudal fin containing 18–21 rays. Internally, the caudal has a slightly asymmetrical heterocercal structure though, externally, the tail often appears diphycercal.

The anal fin has 15–18 rays and is distinctly separate from the caudal, but is used in correlation with the caudal while swimming. The anal fin can also be used to sex P. endlicheri, as males possess a thicker anal fin than females, as well as an enlarged scaly fold at the base of the fin. The pelvic fins are toward the posterior end of the fish near the anal fin. Each pelvic fin contains 13–16 rays.

The pectoral fins have 40–45 rays and are fairly large and fanlike, extending just to or beyond the vertical of the first dorsal spine. These paddle-like pectorals allow the fish to "walk" along the bottom of their environment and even across short distances on land. P. endlicheri are covered in smooth ganoid scales. Roughly 50–58 scales run longitudinally down the length of the body and 42–46 run around the circumference of the body.

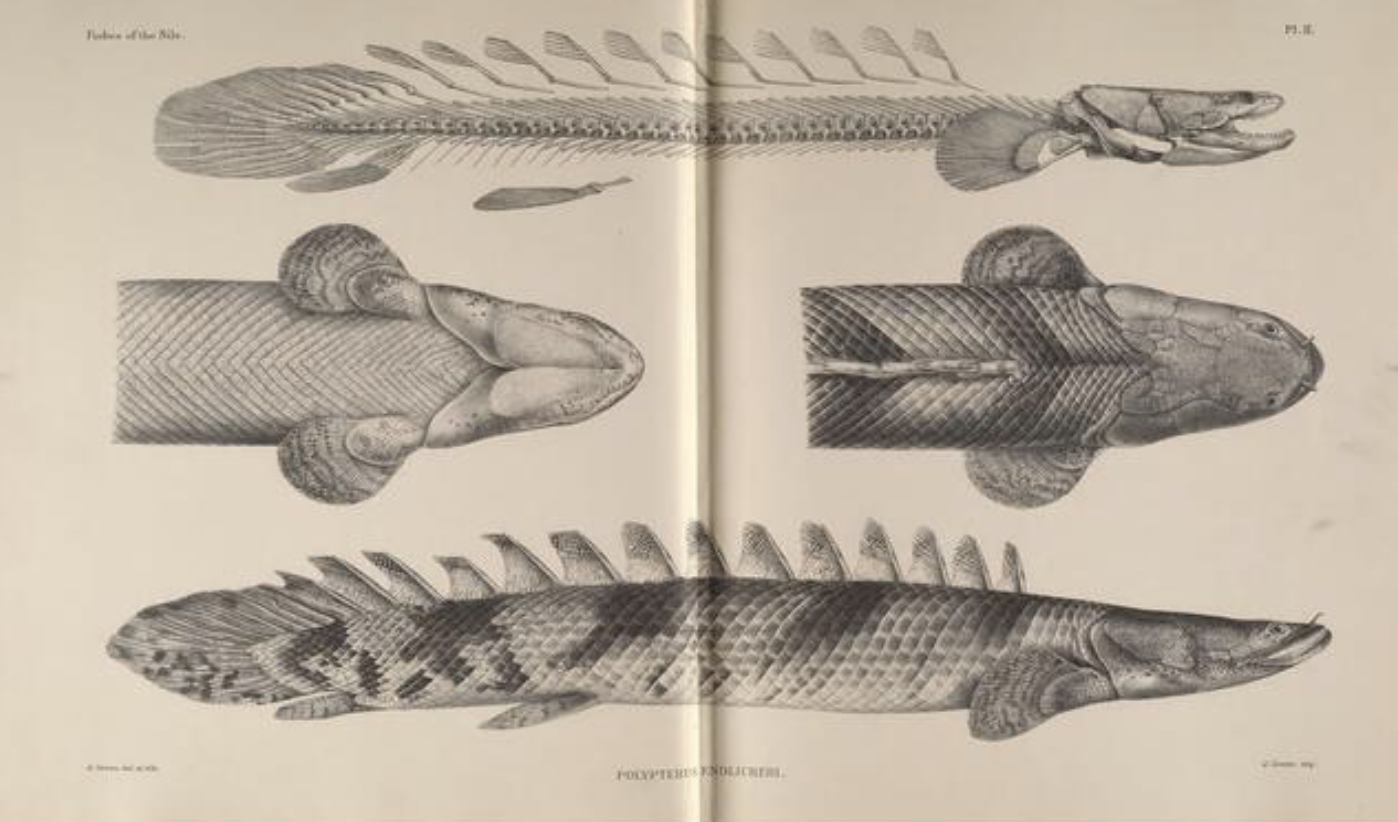
Lateral, ventral, dorsal, and skeletal structure of Polypterus endlicheri

== Habitat and distribution ==
Polypterus endlicheri are commonly found in rivers, lakes, marshes, swamps, and even brackish water systems throughout central and western Africa. Currently, no population estimates have been made, but the IUCN listed P. endlicheri as a species of least concern in 2019 because of their widespread range across Africa. They are native to Benin, Burkina Faso, Cameroon, Central African Republic, Chad, Côte d'Ivoire (Ivory Coast), Ethiopia, Ghana, Guinea, Mali, Nigeria, and Sudan. In central Africa, P. endlicheri are known to inhabit the White Nile, including the Bahr al-Ghazal and Bahr al-Jabal tributary systems, as well as the Baro River. In western Africa, they can be found in the Niger, Comoé, Bandama, Volta and Ouémé Rivers, and the Chad Basin.

P. endlicheri prefer slow-moving waters with heavy vegetation or other forms of cover to support their ambush hunting style. The range of P. endlicheri overlaps those of many other bichir species such as P. senegalus (Gray bichir) and P. bichir (Nile bichir). Despite their overlapping ranges, these bichir species often avoid direct competition by inhabiting slightly different ecological niches. For instance, P. endlicheri and P. senegalus exhibit different thermal preferences, potentially explaining why P. senegalus are often found in shallower waters near banks while P. endlicheri can more often be found in deeper water when they inhabit the same bodies of water.

== Ecology and life history ==
Polypterus endlicheri are estimated to live to around 20 years old in the wild, but have been recorded to live upwards of 20 years in captivity with proper care. Little has been recorded about wild spawning behavior though some captive breeding has been successful. Spawning takes place during the rainy season in response to certain changes in water temperature and chemistry. During mating season, males will "cup" their enlarged anal fin, signaling that they are ready to mate. They will then follow females and repeatedly nudge or bump the females with their body and cupped anal fin. Breaching is also a recorded behavior during courtship rituals. When the female is ready, the male will place its cupped anal fin beneath the female's genital papilla, catching and fertilizing eggs with its milt as they are released. The fertilized eggs are then scattered amongst vegetation. After about three days, fry, roughly 5 millimetres (0.20 in) long, hatch from the eggs.

Larvae are born with external gills which they use until the internal lungs are fully developed, at which point the external gills are shed. This usually occurs during the transition from the larval to juvenile stage but captive specimens have been recorded with external gills well into their juvenile growth. Their internal lungs are derived from a modified swim bladder and allow them to gulp atmospheric air. Adult specimens still primarily depend on gills for oxygen exchange but can supplement with atmospheric air, allowing them to survive in stagnant waters and other oxygen-depleted aquatic environments. These primitive lungs also allow them to survive out of water for short periods.

P. endlicheri are primarily nocturnal, doing most of their hunting and traversing at night, using their elevated sense of smell to track down prey. They are generally piscivorous, feeding on fish such as tilapia and catfish. However, they are opportunistic and will feed on crustaceans, mollusks and even scavenge off large carcasses. P. endlicheri do not face many threats as adults but may still be eaten by crocodiles, fish-eating birds, and larger predatory fish such as Nile perch and Vundu catfish.

== Cultural importance ==
Like many other Polyptidae species, P. endlicheri are very popular among aquarium hobbyists. As a result, they are extensively traded as exotic pets, most of which are wild-caught, potentially threatening natural populations. Additionally, their popularity as pets has resulted in released specimens forming small populations outside of their native range in other tropical environments such as Florida. P. endlicheri are locally caught and harvested for food in central and western Africa but are not typically traded for consumption outside of their natural range. Surprisingly, although regionally significant to many Nile-dependent African communities today, Polypteri have not been found to be depicted by ancient Egyptians.

== See also ==
- List of freshwater aquarium fish species
