= Beishanichthys =

Beishanichthys Temporal range: Early Triassic, 251–247 Ma

Scientific classification
- Domain: Eukaryota
- Kingdom: Animalia
- Phylum: Chordata
- Class: Actinopterygii
- Order: †Scanilepiformes
- Genus: †Beishanichthys; Xu & Gao, 2011
- Species: †B. brevicaudalis

Binomial name
- †Beishanichthys brevicaudalis Xu & Gao, 2011

Extinct genus of fishes

Beishanichthys is an extinct genus of freshwater ray-finned fish which existed in Gansu Province, China during the Olenekian age of the early Triassic period. It contains a single species, B. brevicaudalis, first named by Guang-Hui Xu, Ke-Qin Gao in 2011 based on fossils from the Lower Triassic lake deposits exposed in northern Gansu, China. It is considered a scanilepiform, a group of early cladistians related to the modern bichirs, although Beishanichthys was not incorporated into the analyses that found this phylogenetic placement among the cladistians.
