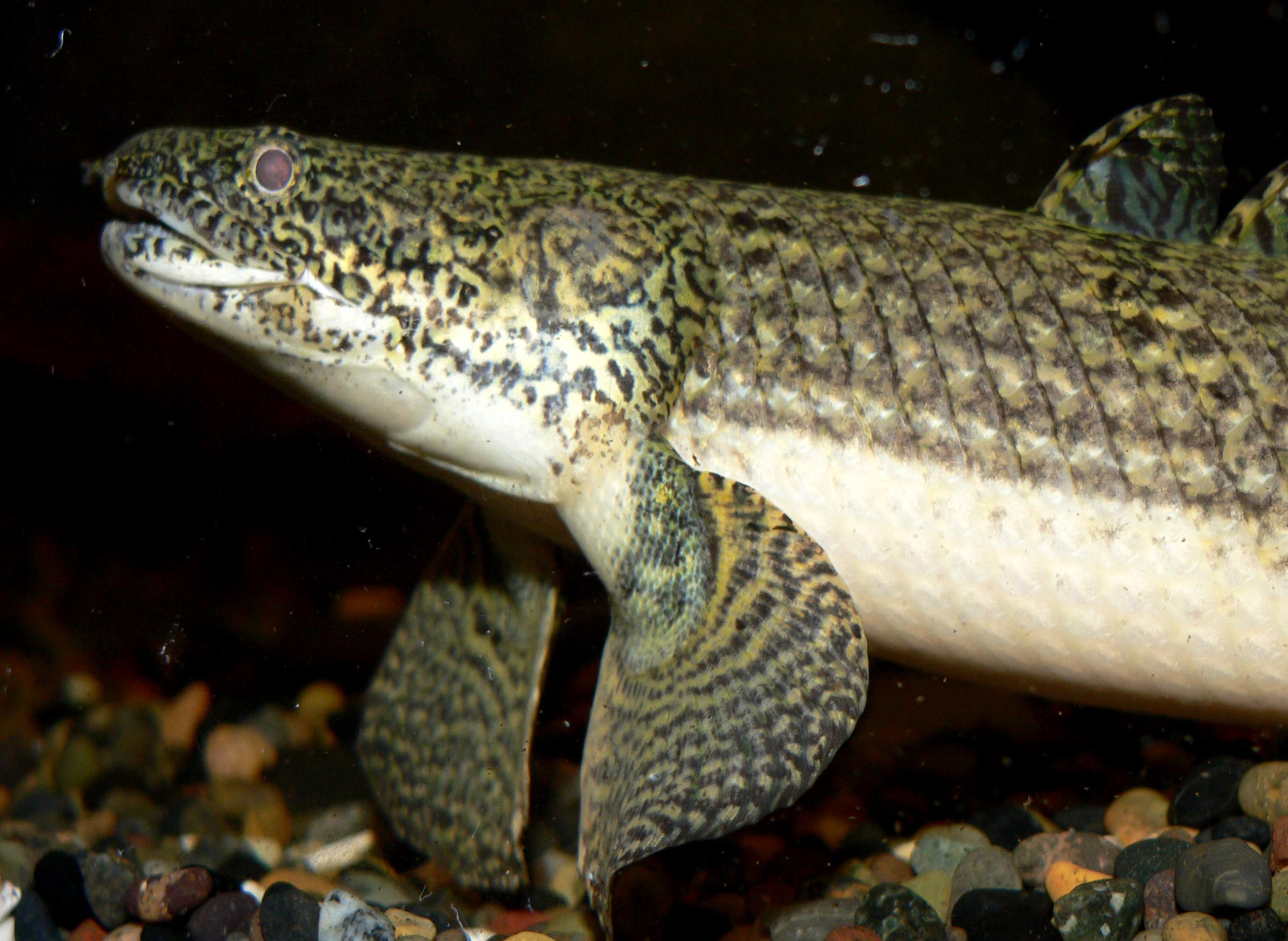

Conservation status
- Least Concern (IUCN 3.1)

Scientific classification
- Kingdom: Animalia
- Phylum: Chordata
- Class: Actinopterygii
- Order: Polypteriformes
- Family: Polypteridae
- Genus: Polypterus
- Species: P. weeksii

Binomial name
- Polypterus weeksii Boulenger, 1898
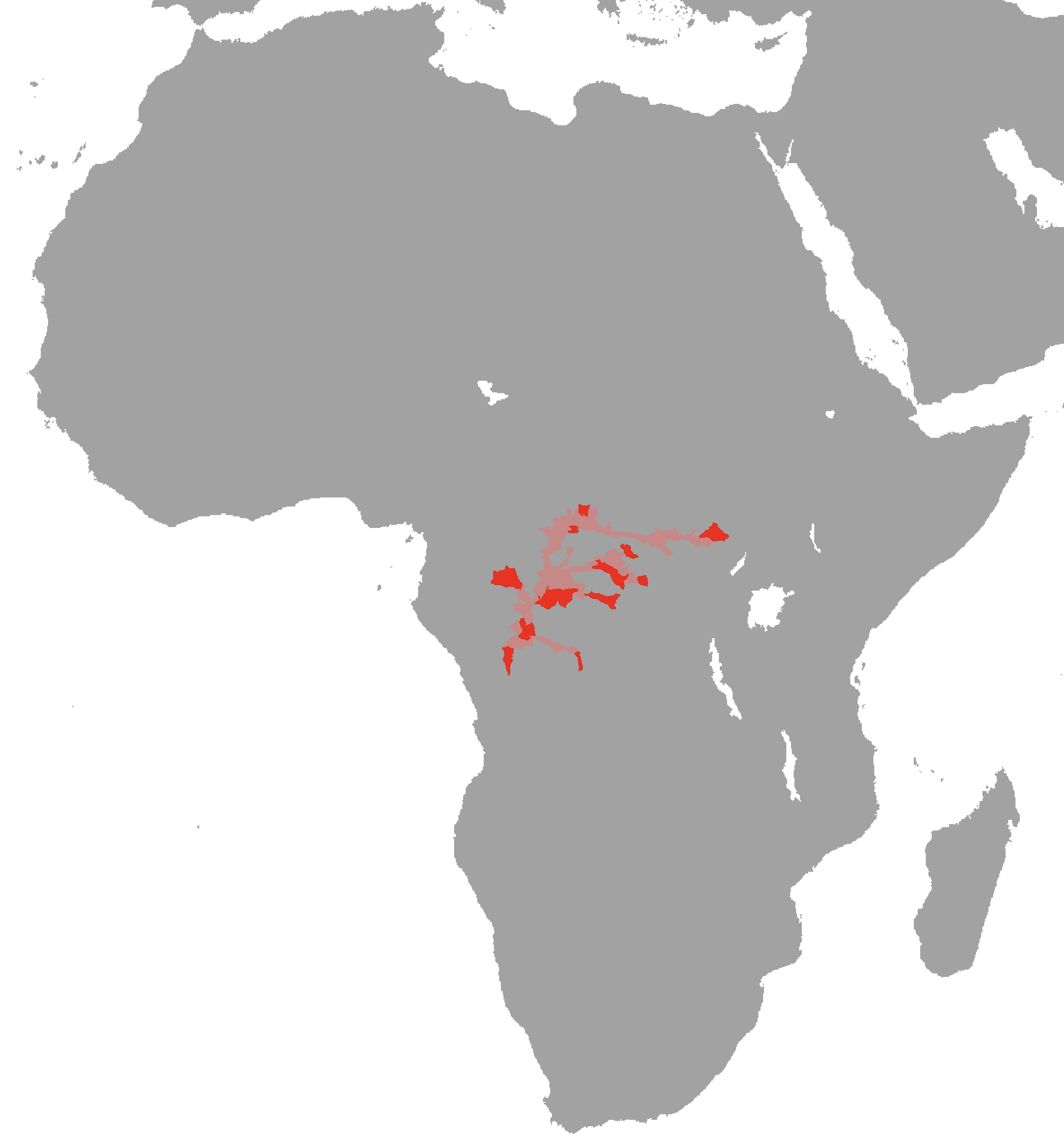

Synonyms
- Polypterus schoutedeni Pellegrin 1923

= Polypterus weeksii =

Species of fish

Polypterus weeksii, the mottled bichir, is a fish in the family Polypteridae found in the central basin of the Congo River. It grows to about 54 cm in head-to-tail length.

Named in honor of John Henry Weeks (1861-1924), Baptist missionary, ethnographer, explorer and diarist, who collected type at his mission station in Monsembe, upper Congo River, Zaire (now Democratic Republic of the Congo).
