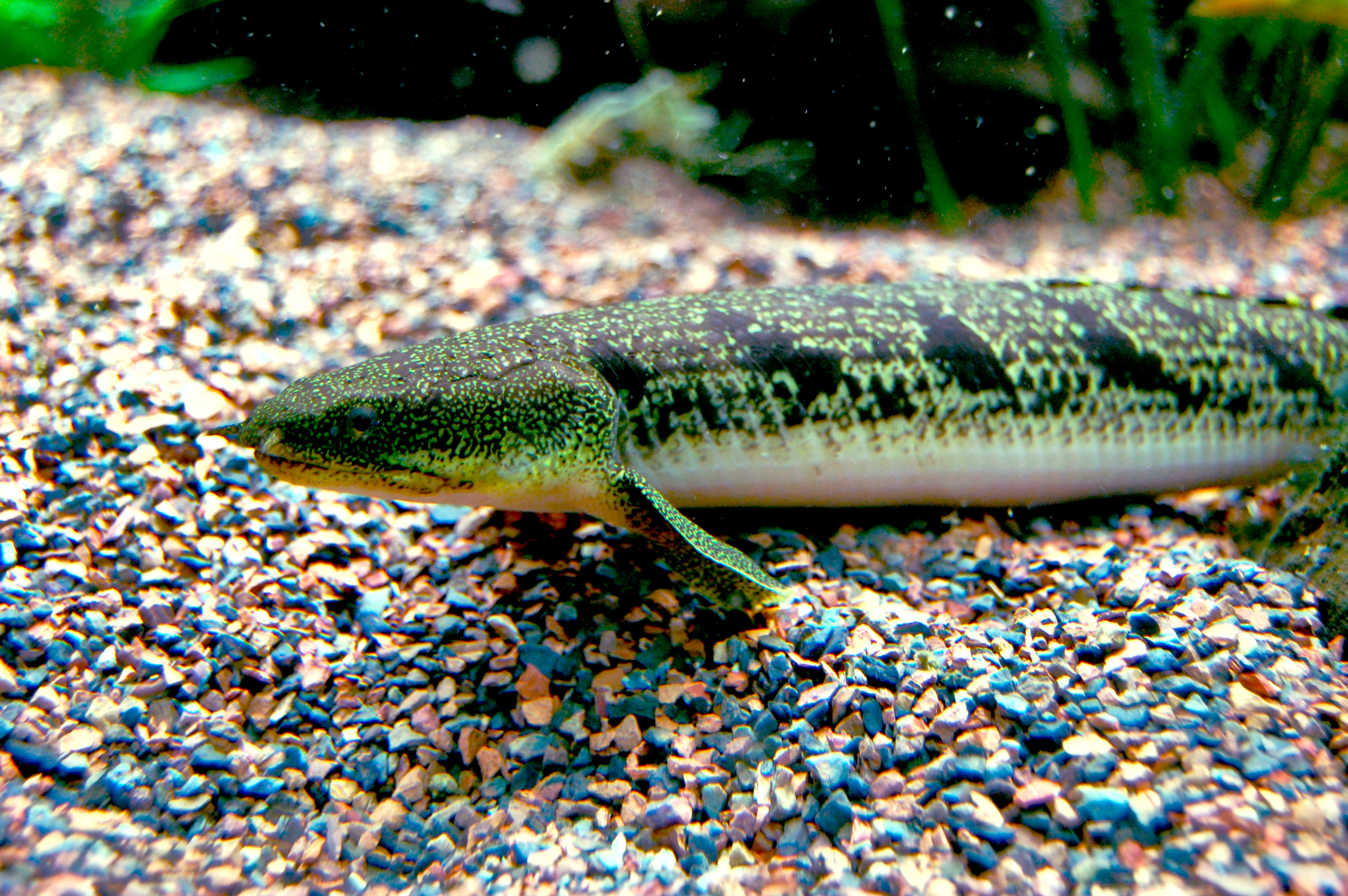
- Barred bichir at the New England Aquarium

Conservation status
- Least Concern (IUCN 3.1)

Scientific classification
- Kingdom: Animalia
- Phylum: Chordata
- Class: Actinopterygii
- Order: Polypteriformes
- Family: Polypteridae
- Genus: Polypterus
- Species: P. delhezi

Binomial name
- Polypterus delhezi Boulenger, 1899
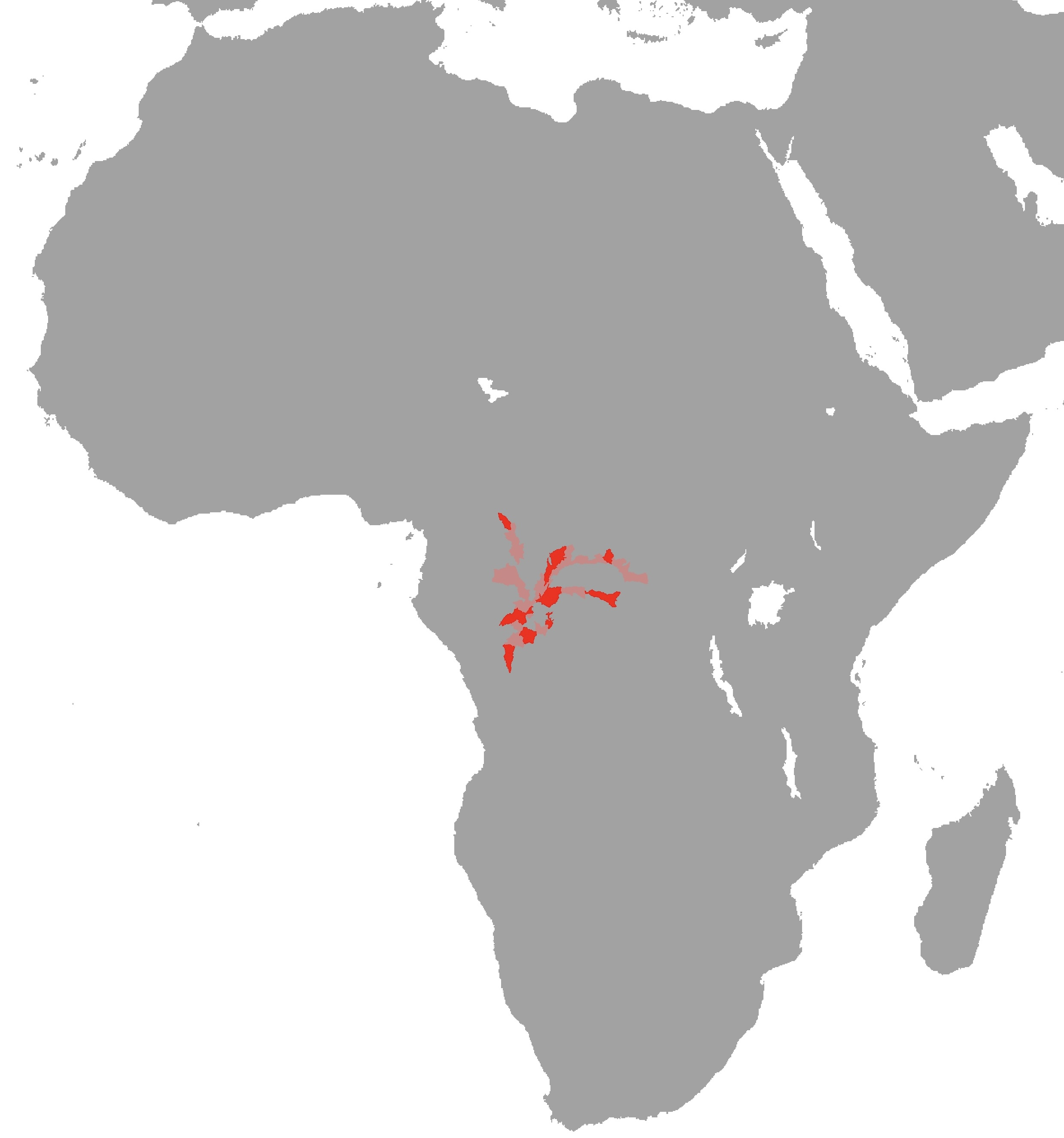

Synonyms
- Polypterus ansorgei delhezi (sic) (Boulenger 1899)

= Barred bichir =

Species of fish

The barred bichir, armoured bichir, bandback bichir, or banded bichir (Polypterus delhezi) is a species of fish belonging to the class Actinopterygii, or the ray-finned fish, which constitute an order of the class of the bony fish. an elongated fish found in the Congo River, specifically in the upper and middle portions. This species is one of the more commonly available in commercial pet stores.

The species was named in honor of Belgian artist and naturalist Henri Paul Delhez (1870–1900), who collected the type and provided life-history notes on bichirs based on interviews with locals; his collections and field observations were useful in the preparation of Boulenger's book on Congo fishes.

== Description ==
P. delhezi is greyish in color, and specks of yellow or green coloration have also been observed. Compared to the dorsal side, the ventral surface seems to be lighter in color. It is a rather unique species from a notably old group of fishes, possessing several traits than set them apart from their close relatives. The dorsal fin is very distinct in its shape, made up of a series of individual spines. They have a mostly cartilaginous body, like a shark's, and the primitive shape of its jawbones are more akin to that of a salamander's than a fish.

Another notable characteristic of P. delhezi is its modified swim bladder. In bony fish, the swim bladder is an internal, gas-filled chamber, an organ that likely evolved to help fish control their buoyancy and stay at their preferred water depth. In P. delhezi, the swim bladder also functions as a type of lung. The swim bladder is divided into 2 parts, of which the right hand section is considerably larger. This functions as an accessory breathing organ and means the fish can survive out of water for some time, provided it is kept moist. For this reason, Polypterus is the only known vertebrate to have lungs, but no trachea.

Another aspect of the barred bichir, which illuminates its primitive lineage and surviving characteristics, are its scales. Scales vary significantly in shape, size, and consistency, and the morphology of fish scales can generally be used to identify the species of fish that it came from. Its scales are primitive as well, each being covered with 'ganoin', a substance with similarities to tooth enamel. Similar to the type of scales found in sturgeons, paddlefishes, gars, and bowfin, bichirs also share the trait of ganoid scales. Deriving from cosmoid scales, they are thicker compared to other types of scales and consist of a layer of dentine and ganoine, an inorganic bone salt. They also connect with peg-and-socket like joints, thus ganoid scales do not overlap with each other.

Each scale is shaped like a rhombus and is non¬overlapping with those surrounding it delhezi also belongs to the "upper-jawed" subclass of Polypterus, meaning that its upper jaw protrudes out farther than the lower jaw. The cleaver-shaped cheek and maxilla (upper external jaw bone) bears an uncanny resemblance to early ray-finned fishes, suggestive of a shared primitive condition for bony fishes. Again, this jaw shape reiterates the bichir's eating capabilities and diet, which includes smaller animals capable of being sucked into their mouth.

== Distribution and habitat ==
The barred bichir was first discovered in the Congo River, and is commonly found especially in the upper and middle portions of the Congo River. Although only found in nature in this small region of Central Africa, this species has been bred in captivity and has become a common fish for aquariums or aquarists.

== Ecology and behaviour ==
A nocturnal species, P. delhezi relies significantly on their sense of smell, rather than their poor sense of sight when it comes to hunting and locating food. In the wild, the barred bichir will hide during the day, only emerging at night to hunt prey. Their diet is entirely carnivorous and includes more or less anything which can be sucked into their mouths, including small fish, insects, and worms. This preference for a meaty diet can be observed in both wild species as well as in those kept as aquatic pets, in which shrimp, prawn and mussels have been noted as the favored prey.
