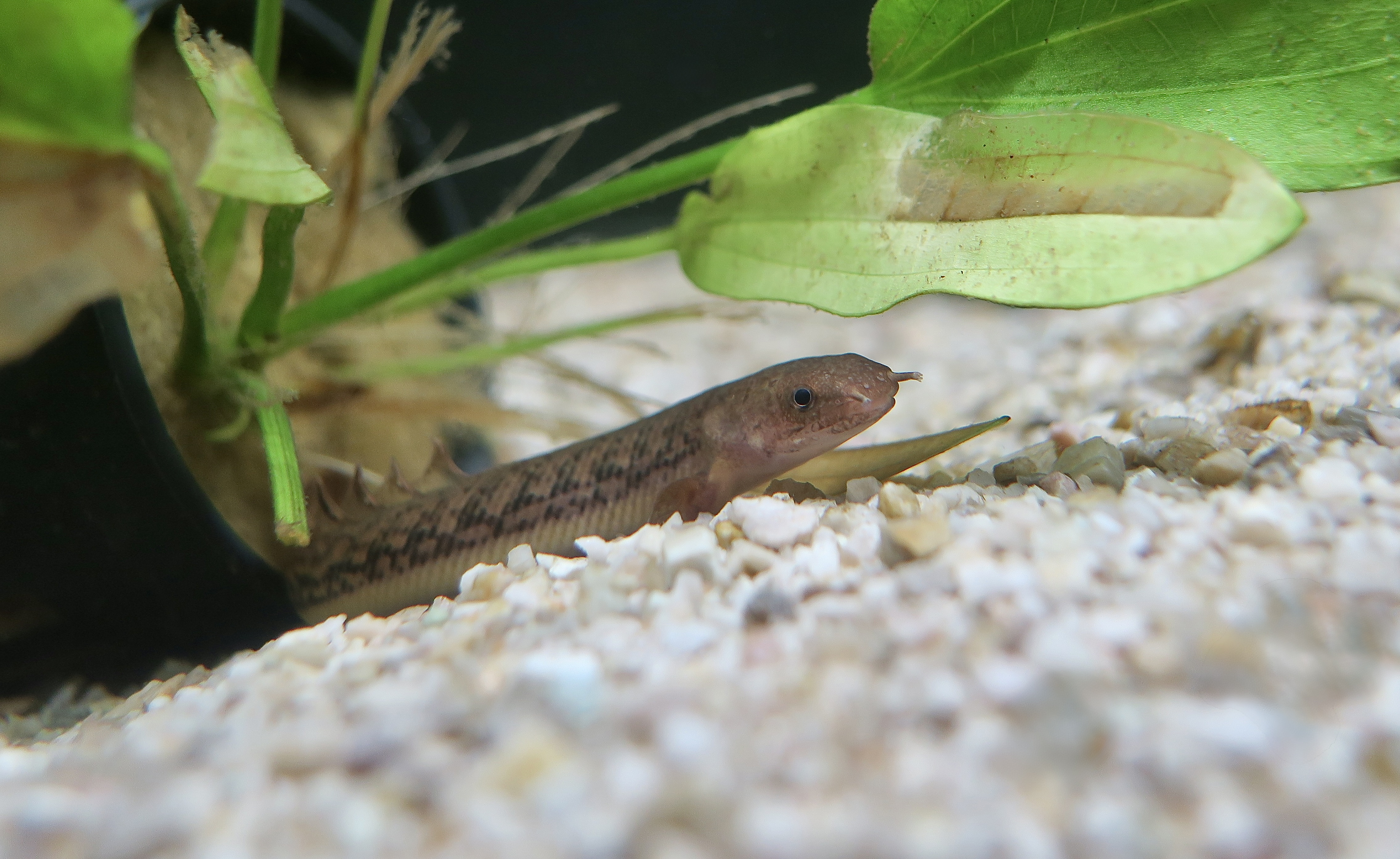

Conservation status
- Data Deficient (IUCN 3.1)

Scientific classification
- Kingdom: Animalia
- Phylum: Chordata
- Class: Actinopterygii
- Order: Polypteriformes
- Family: Polypteridae
- Genus: Polypterus
- Species: P. teugelsi

Binomial name
- Polypterus teugelsi Britz, 2004
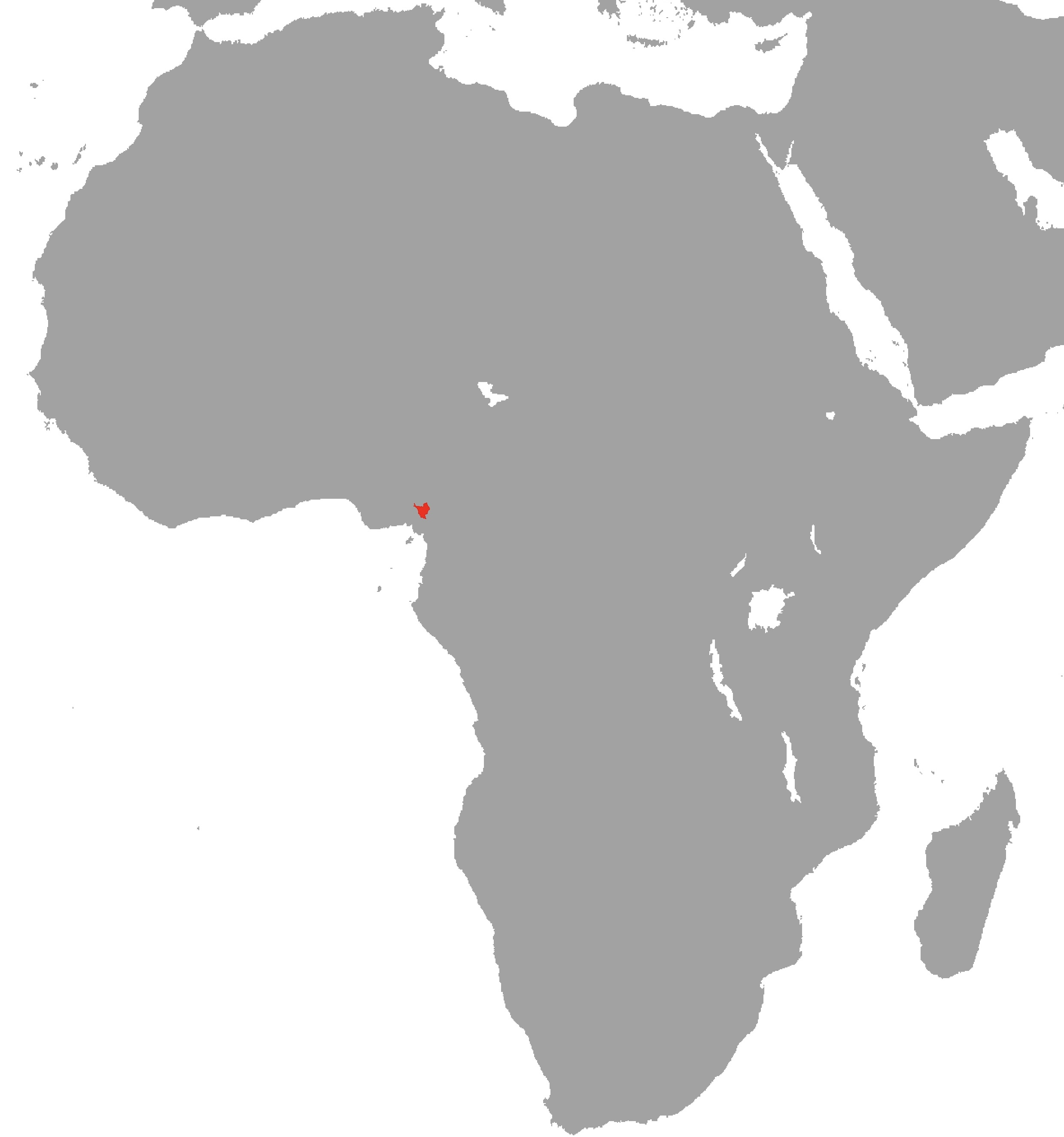

= Polypterus teugelsi =

Species of fish

Polypterus teugelsi (Teugelsi bichir) is a species of carnivorous, nocturnal bichir (a group of primitive ray-finned fishes) that lives in the Cross River drainage basin in the country of Cameroon. P. teugelsi was described in 2004 by Ralf Britz.

== Etymology ==
Named in honor of Guy Teugels (1954–2003), curator of fishes at the Musée Royale de l'Afrique Centrale.

== Description ==
Wild-caught P. teugelsi can reach lengths of 24-26 inches (60-66 cm), but captive-bred specimens rarely exceed 16 inches (40 cm). It has a network of black markings on the dorsal surface and the medial and pelvic fins, completely black pectoral fins, and an orange ventral surface. It can be distinguished from the similar-looking Polypterus palmas by its ruddier color, fuller and usually erect dorsal finlets and caudal fin, and elongated body.

The species is most commonly found in shady, slow-moving streams with lush foliage on the edge of the streams. It is a seasonal spawner and egg scatterer that does not exhibit parental care. The IUCN does not have enough data to evaluate the condition of this species.

Because bichirs diverged from other ray-finned fishes so early in their evolutionary history, P. teugelsi's morphology is unusually "primitive" when compared to other extant fishes. As a result, it is considered a living fossil. Because it retained true lungs, it is amphibious and can gulp air from the surface of the water in conditions with low dissolved oxygen. Similarly to stem-tetrapods, it uses a blowhole-like organ called a spiracle to take breaths of atmospheric oxygen. If their gills remain sufficiently wet, they can survive on land indefinitely. Juvenile P. teugelsi have external gills that resemble those of young amphibians. These gills are large and have branching, featherlike architecture to maximize surface area for oxygen exchange to compensate for the young fish's underdeveloped respiratory system. As the fish age and their lungs develop, they lose these external gill structures and take on the gill structure of a typical fish.

Like most bichirs, P. teugelsi's vision is somewhat lackluster, so it instead hunts using its lateral line and sense of smell. One of its notable stabilomorphic traits is its accessory olfactory organ—an internal structure that has become vestigial or nonexistent in most extant fishes. Due to its retention of this organ and elongate, nostril-like structures called nares, P. teugelsi has a very precise sense of smell.

== In the Aquarium ==
P. teugelsi can be found rarely in the aquarium trade. Despite being relatively recently discovered, captive breeding has been accomplished in this species; unlike Polypterus mokelembembe, another bichir species discovered in the 2000s, most specimens of P. teugelsi in the aquarium trade are tank raised. Their care requirements are similar to other bichirs—as large, nocturnal, obligate carnivores, a large aquarium with plenty of shade, places to hide, and a diet of live or frozen foods is necessary to raise this fish. Common dietary choices include bloodworms, blackworms, feeder fish, shrimp (in small quantities), and earthworms.

Like most bichirs, they are very hardy and can tolerate a wide range of water chemistries and dissolved oxygen levels due to their ability to process atmospheric oxygen. Adults should be kept in tanks with a volume of around 150 gallons, but smaller tank sizes are acceptable for growing out juveniles.
