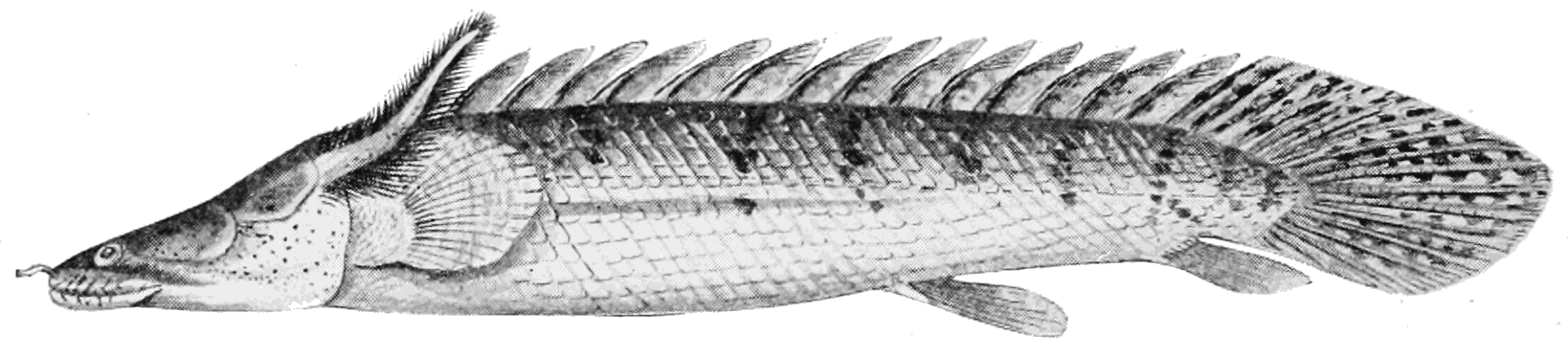

Conservation status
- Least Concern (IUCN 3.1)

Scientific classification
- Kingdom: Animalia
- Phylum: Chordata
- Class: Actinopterygii
- Order: Polypteriformes
- Family: Polypteridae
- Genus: Polypterus
- Species: P. congicus

Binomial name
- Polypterus congicus Boulenger, 1898
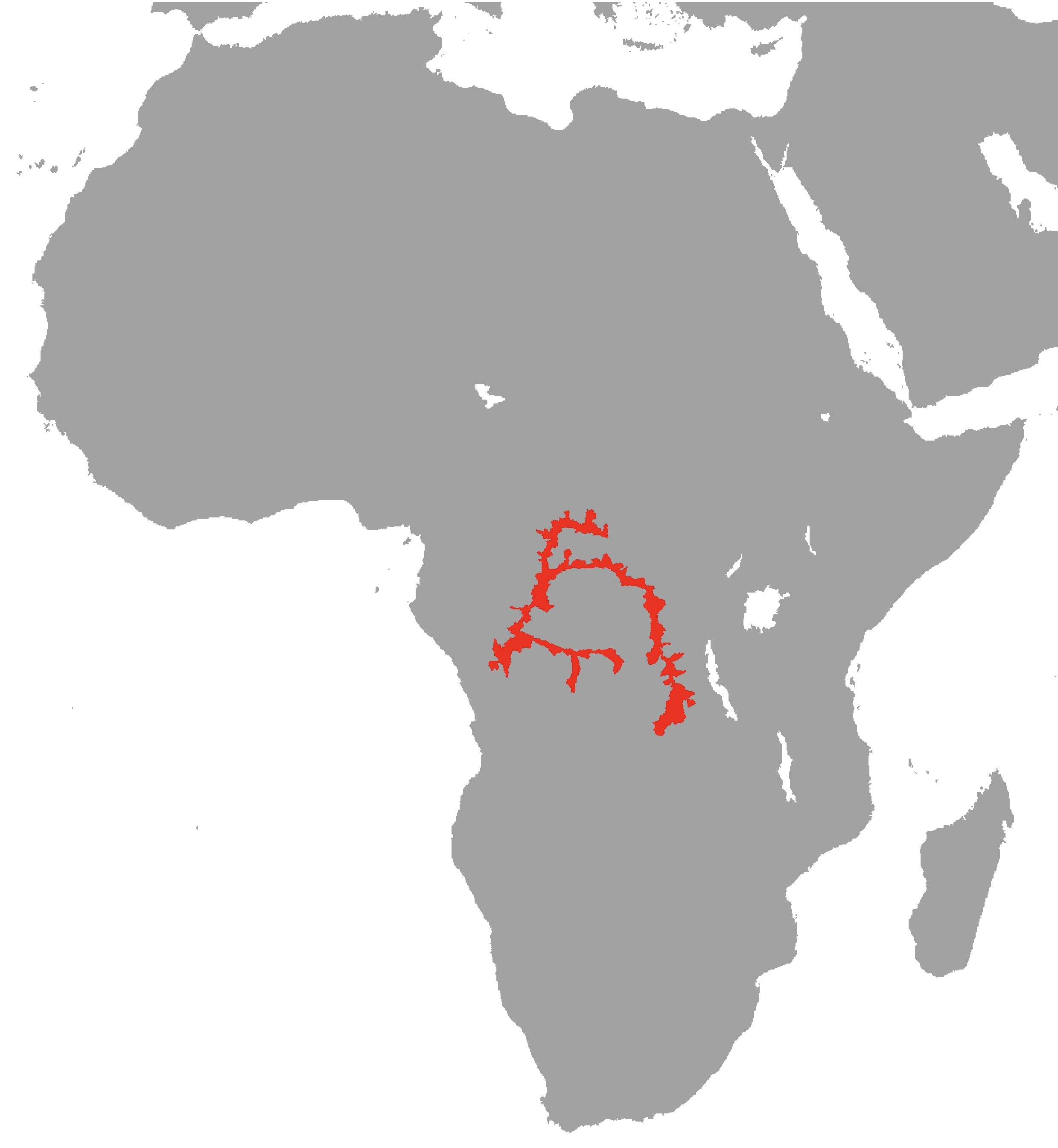

Synonyms
- Polypterus endlicherii congicus (Boulenger 1898); Polypterus bichir katangae (Poll 1941); Polypterus katangae Poll 1941

= Polypterus congicus =

Congo bichir

Species of fish

Polypterus congicus, the Congo bichir, is a species of bichir with a maximum recorded size of 970 millimetres (38 in). The colour also varies from yellowish brown to grey, darker in the top, paler in the ventral area. It has a pattern of around 8 irregular vertical bands along the flanks of the fish, that do not extend completely onto the ventral surface. The lower jaw is prominent, much like Polypterus endlicherii. The male has a wider and thicker anal fin. These fish are commonly sold as pets.

== See also ==
- List of freshwater aquarium fish species
