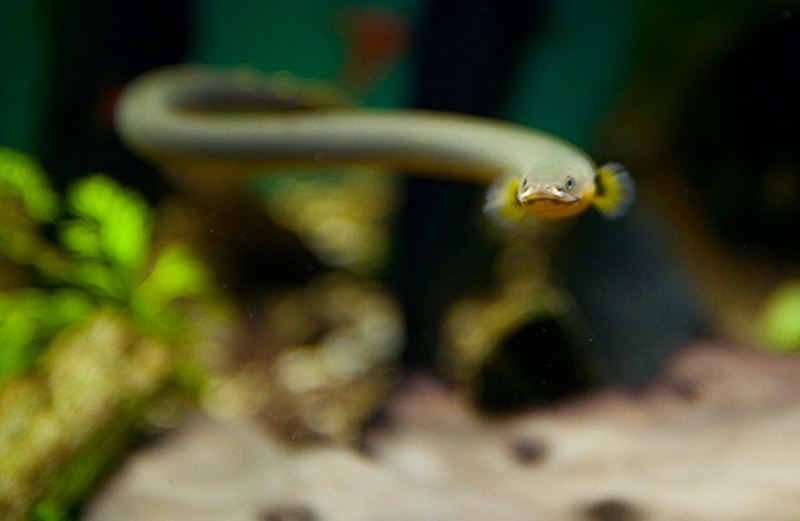

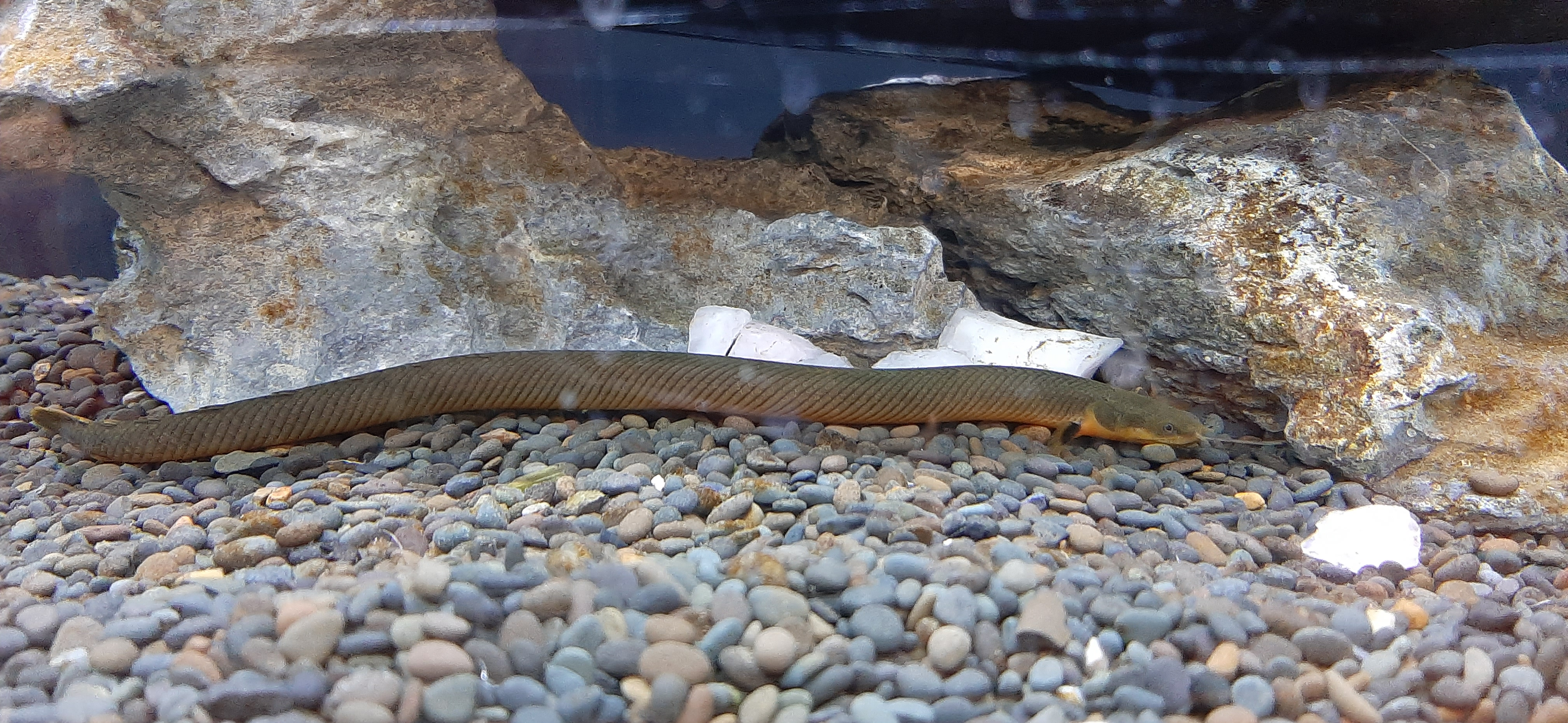

Conservation status
- Near Threatened (IUCN 3.1)

Scientific classification
- Kingdom: Animalia
- Phylum: Chordata
- Class: Actinopterygii
- Order: Polypteriformes
- Family: Polypteridae
- Genus: Erpetoichthys; J. A. Smith, 1865
- Species: E. calabaricus

Binomial name
- Erpetoichthys calabaricus J. A. Smith, 1865
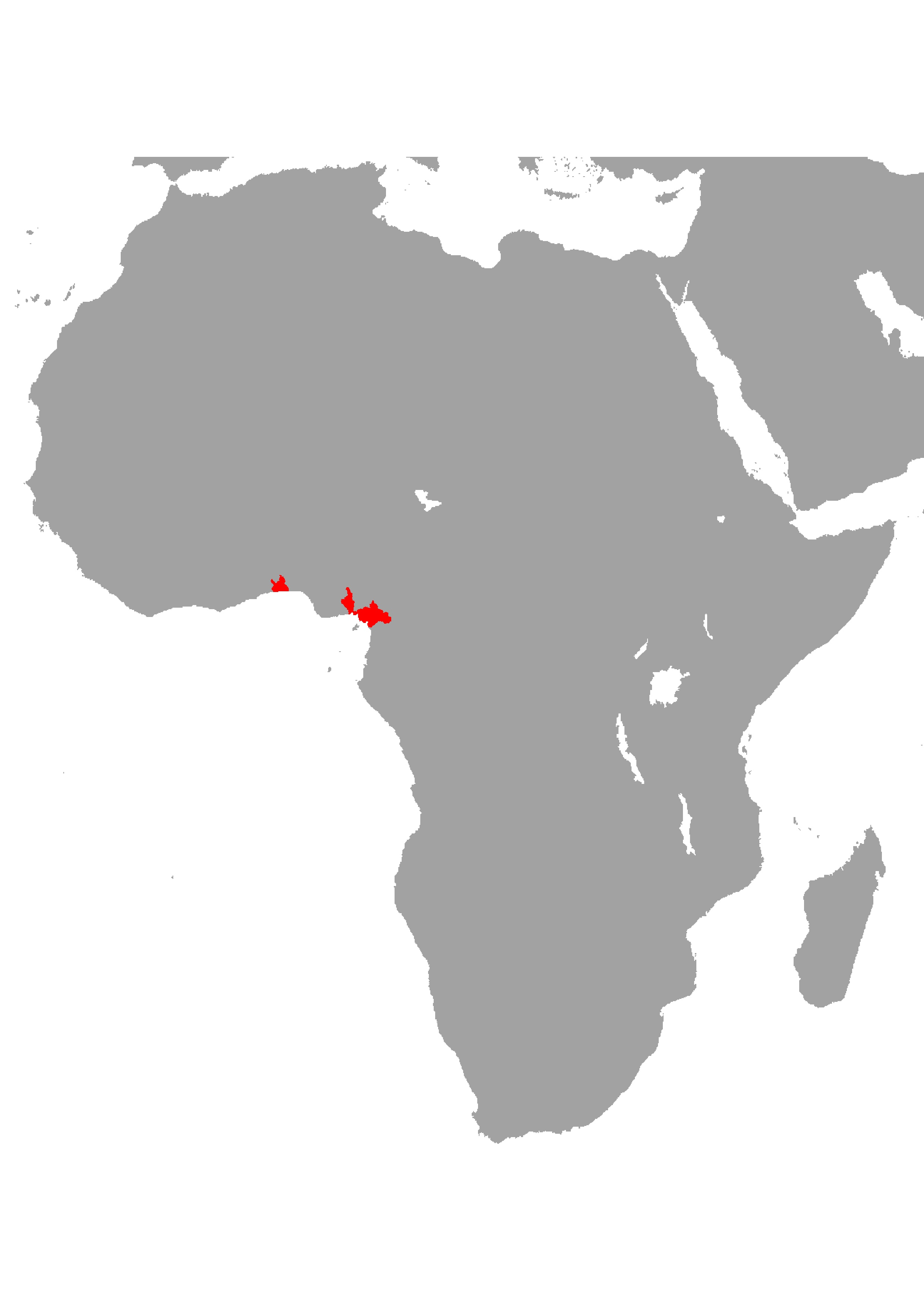

Synonyms
- Calamoichthys calabaricus (Smith 1865) Smith 1866; Erpetoichthys robbianus Smith 1865; Polypterus erpetoideus Smith 1865

= Reedfish =

Species of fish

The reedfish, ropefish (more commonly used in the United States), or snakefish, Erpetoichthys calabaricus, is a species of fish in the family Polypteridae alongside the bichirs. It is the only member of the genus Erpetoichthys. It is native to fresh and brackish waters in West and Central Africa. The reedfish possesses a pair of lungs in addition to gills, allowing it to survive in very oxygen-poor water. It is threatened by habitat loss through palm oil plantations, other agriculture, deforestation, and urban development.

== Description ==
The largest confirmed reedfish museum specimen was 37 cm (15 in) long, and three studies where more than 2,000 wild reedfish were caught (using basket traps, meaning that only individuals longer than 15–20 cm [6–8 in] were retained) found none that exceeded 41.4 cm (16.3 in). Reedfish have sometimes been incorrectly claimed to reach up to 90 cm (3 ft) long. The sexes are very similar in both median and maximum length, but females average heavier than males of a similar length, and they can be reliably separated by the shape of their anal fin. Reedfish are dark above and on the sides, with lighter orangish or yellowish underparts. Males are generally more olive-green in colour, whereas females generally are more yellowish-brown. Larvae have conspicuous external gills, making them resemble salamander larvae.

Body elongation in fishes, such as eels, usually happens through the addition of caudal (tail) vertebrae, but in bichirs it has happened through the addition of precaudal vertebrae. Reedfish have evolved a more snakelike body by having twice as many precaudal vertebrae as the members of its sister genus Polypterus, despite having the same number of tail vertebrae. Unlike Polypterus, Erpetoichthys lack pelvic fins and the subopercle, and the long dorsal fin, which consists of a series of well-separated "spines", are each supported by a single fin ray rather than multiple rays as in Polypterus. The reedfish possesses a pair of lungs, enabling it to breathe atmospheric air. This allows the species to survive in water with low dissolved oxygen content and to survive for an intermediate amount of time out of water.

The genus name derives from the Greek words erpeton (creeping thing) and ichthys (fish).

== Distribution and habitat ==
The reedfish inhabits slow-moving or standing, fresh or brackish, relatively warm tropical water, and usually in places with reeds or other dense plant growth. It occurs in Benin, Cameroon and Nigeria, spanning the area from the Ouémé River to the Sanaga River. There are old records from the Chiloango River in DR Congo and Cabinda in Angola, but these are unconfirmed and questionable.

== Ecology ==
The reedfish is nocturnal, and feeds on annelid worms, small crustaceans (such as shrimp), insects (both adults and their larvae), snails and small fish. When moving through water slowly, it tends to use its pectoral fins, and when moving quickly changes to an eel-like form of swimming (making more use of full-body movements and the caudal fin). Unlike their sister genus Polypterus, which does not leave water voluntarily, reedfish are known to explore land both in the wild and in captivity if given the opportunity, slithering along like a snake and also taking food items on land. Prey captured on land is brought back to the water.

Females repeatedly deposit small batches of eggs between the anal fins of the male, where they are fertilized. The male reedfish then scatters the eggs among aquatic vegetation, where they stick to plants and substrate. Larvae hatch rapidly (after 70 hours) but remain attached to vegetation; they become independent and start to feed after ~22 days, when the egg's yolk sac has been consumed.

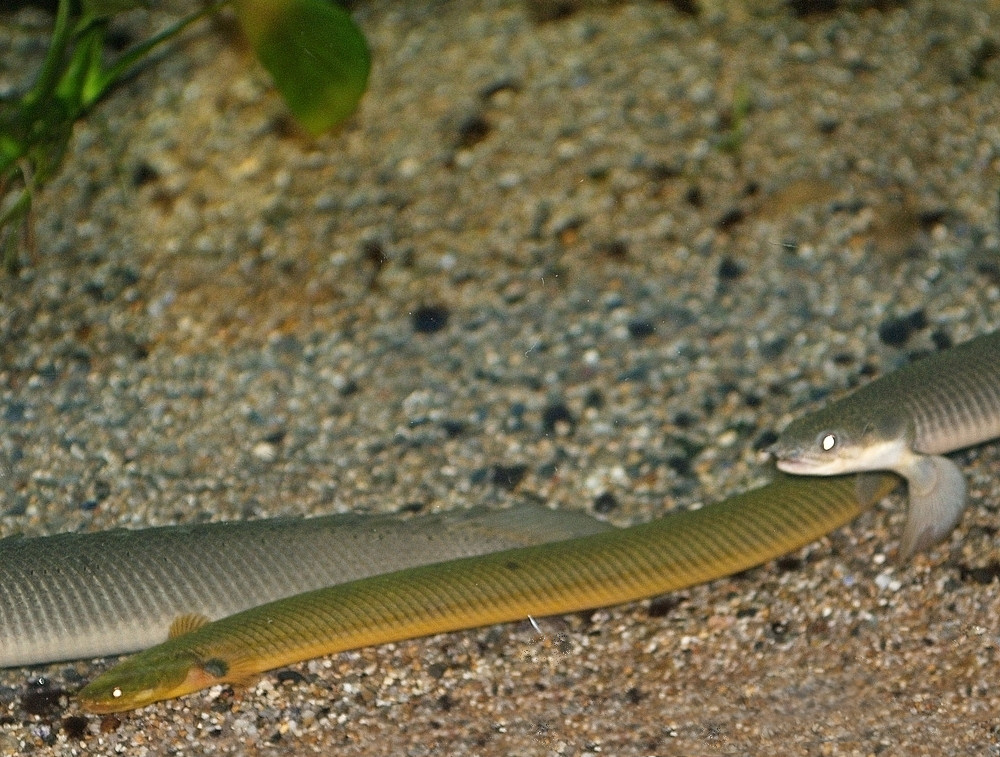
A yellowish-green ropefish amongst grey Polypterus senegalus

== Relation to humans ==
In coastal central Africa, the species is threatened by habitat loss driven by the development of oil palm plantations. Populations in western Africa are impacted by degradation and loss of habitat from wetland drainage for agricultural and urban developments. The reedfish is currently classified as Near Threatened by the IUCN. It is regarded as a good food fish and commonly caught in the local subsistence fishery. It is also regularly caught for the international aquarium fish trade. Overall, catch levels do not appear to represent a major threat to the species at present, but do need monitoring.

=== In the aquarium ===
Reedfish are sometimes displayed in aquaria. Spawning and hatching in captivity has been observed in the 1990s, but none of those hatchlings have been reported to survive to adulthood.

They are inquisitive, peaceful, and have some "personality". Although nocturnal, reedfish will sometimes come out during the day. Since they have a peaceful nature, other fish may "bully" a reedfish, despite its large size, especially in competition for food or space. Some reedfish also have an inclination to stay close to the water surface, where they will be safe from other fish and will even allow most of their bodies to leave the water at times.

They can be difficult to keep; they will jump and enter pumps to escape tanks and frequently die as a result, and they can be sensitive to pH swings and nitrogen chemistry. They will often consume other smaller fish when given the opportunity. Often small feeder goldfish and minnows are eaten in place of bloodworms or nightcrawlers, and other commercially available live fish food.

== See also ==
- List of freshwater aquarium fish species
