= John Alexander Smith (physician) =

Scottish physician, antiquarian, archaeologist and ornithologist

John Alexander Smith FRSE FSA Scot (June 1818–17 August 1883) was a Scottish physician, antiquarian, archaeologist and ornithologist.

== Life ==
He was born at 13 Hope Street, off Charlotte Square, in June 1818, the son of architect James Smith, the last Master Mason of Scotland. He was educated at the High School in Edinburgh then studied medicine at the University of Edinburgh receiving his doctorate (MD) in 1840.

He set up practice as a GP in Edinburgh's West End at 7 West Maitland Street.

In 1863 he was elected a Fellow of the Royal Society of Edinburgh his proposer being John Hutton Balfour.

From 1870 to 1873 he was Vice President of the Society of Antiquaries of Scotland. In 1874 he succeeded the late Dr Somerville as Treasurer of the Royal College of Physicians of Edinburgh. From 1876 to 1879 he was President of the Royal Physical Society of Edinburgh, having served 21 years as Treasurer.

He died from a malignant tumour of the upper jaw, at home, 10 Palmerston Place, in Edinburgh's West End on 17 August 1883. He never married and lived his final years with his sister and nephew.

== Publications ==
- Observations on some Negro Crania from Old Calabar (1869)
- Notes on the Ancient Cattle of Scotland (1872)
- Notes on Ancient Feeding Bottles for Infants (1870)
- Notes on the Shingle Roof of the Tower of the Canongate Tolbooth (1870)
- Notice of a Cinerary Urn (1871)
- Notes on the Supposed Charter Chest of "Johnny Faa" (1871)
- Notice on the Discovery of the Remains of an Elk (1871)
