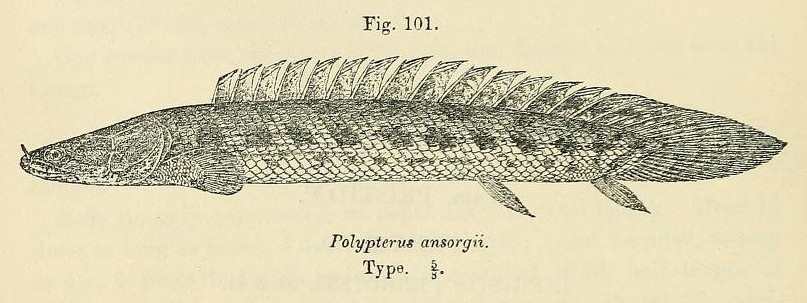

Conservation status
- Least Concern (IUCN 3.1)

Scientific classification
- Kingdom: Animalia
- Phylum: Chordata
- Class: Actinopterygii
- Order: Polypteriformes
- Family: Polypteridae
- Genus: Polypterus
- Species: P. ansorgii

Binomial name
- Polypterus ansorgii Boulenger, 1910
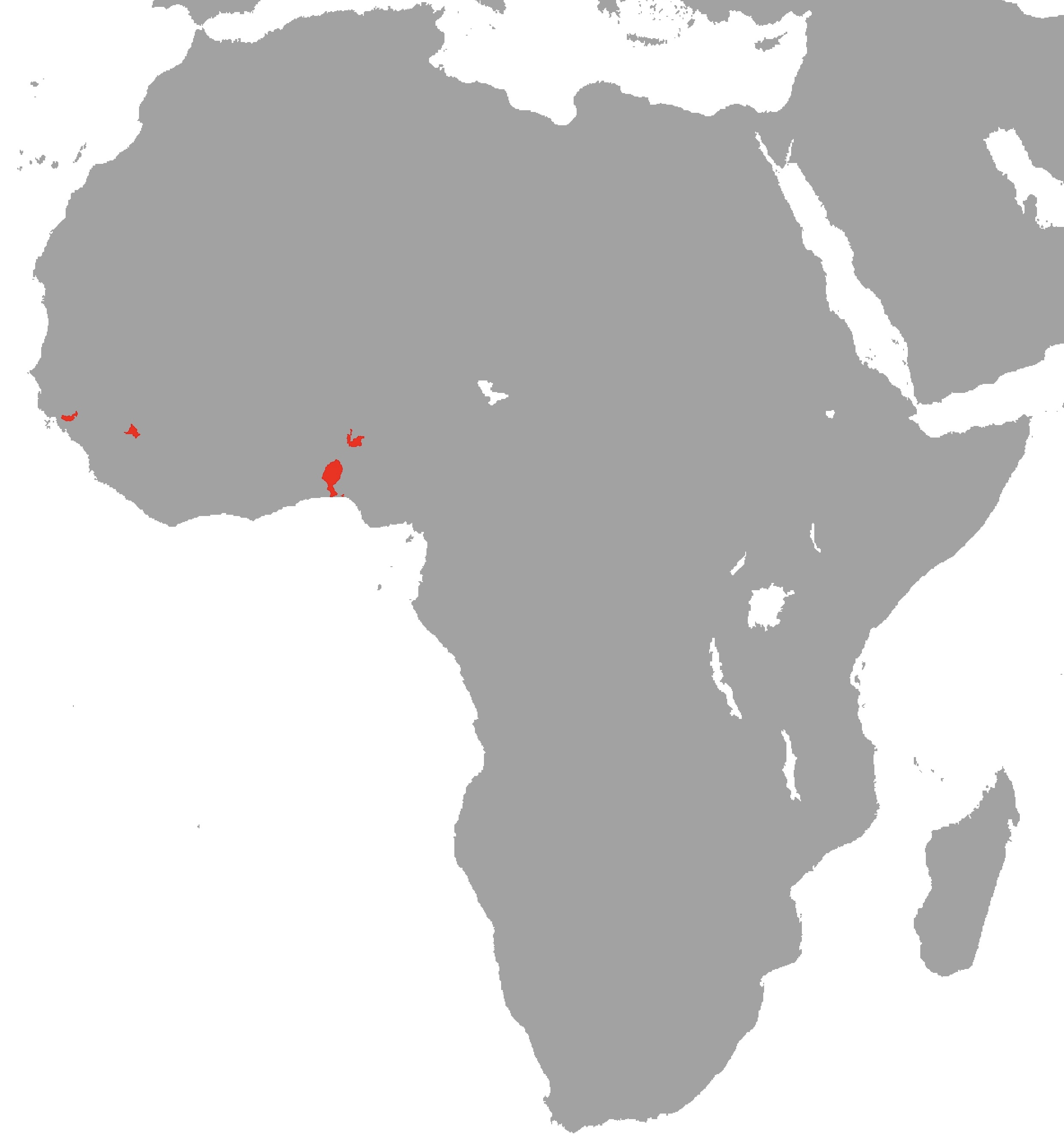

= Guinean bichir =

Species of fish

The Guinean bichir (Polypterus ansorgii) is a ray-finned fish from rivers and other freshwater habitats in Western Africa, ranging from Guinea-Bissau to Nigeria. It reaches a maximum length of 72 cm (28 in), is greenish-brown to black in color, and has large, dark spots and blotches on its sides. On mature specimens, the bottom jaw may protrude very slightly. It is similar to some other bichirs with which it can be confused.

Named in honor of explorer William John Ansorge (1850-1913), who collected type specimen.

== Taxonomy and etymology ==
Polypterus ansorgii was first formally described in 1910 by the Belgian-British zoologist George Albert Boulenger in the Annals and Magazine of Natural History. The type locality was recorded as Tchitoli on the Corubal River in Portuguese Guinea (modern-day Guinea-Bissau). Boulenger based the description on three syntypes (cataloged as BMNH 1910.9.13.4) housed at the Natural History Museum, London.

The species belongs to the genus Polypterus within the family Polypteridae and order Polypteriformes. In some 20th-century ichthyological literature, the specific name was occasionally misspelled as ansorgei.

=== Etymology ===
The genus name Polypterus is derived from the Ancient Greek words polý (πολύ, meaning "many") and pterón (πτερόν, meaning "wing" or "fin"), referring to the row of multiple separate dorsal finlets along its back. The specific epithet ansorgii honors the English explorer and naturalist William John Ansorge (1850–1913), who collected the type specimens.
