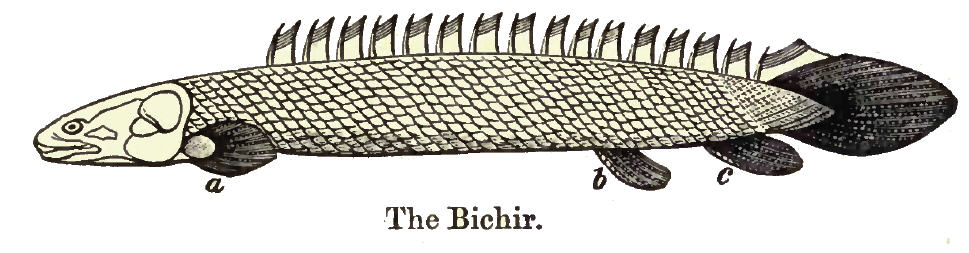
- Polypterus bichir
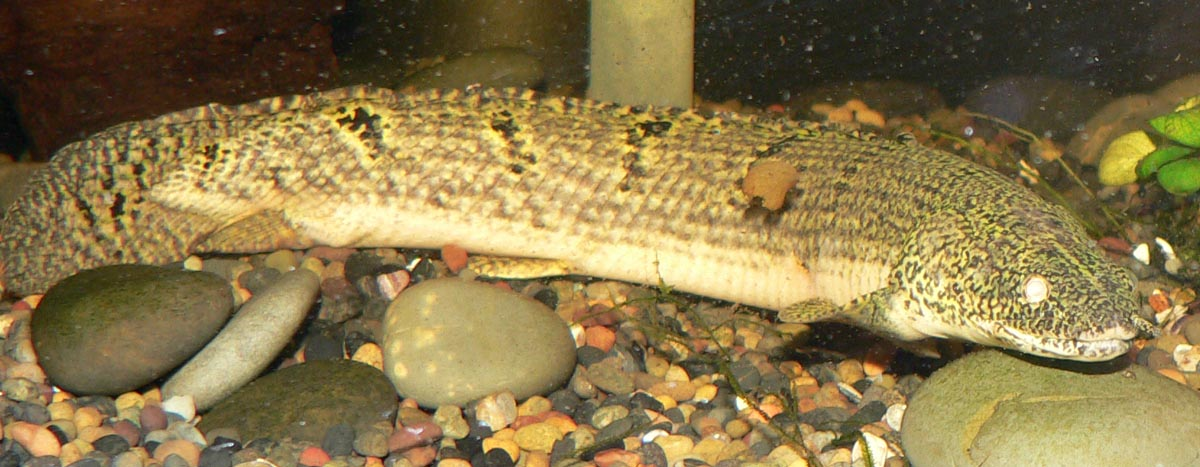
- Polypterus delhezi

Scientific classification
- Kingdom: Animalia
- Phylum: Chordata
- Class: Actinopterygii
- Order: Polypteriformes
- Family: Polypteridae
- Genus: Polypterus; Lacépède, 1803

Type species
- Polypterus bichir Lacépède 1803

Species
- See text
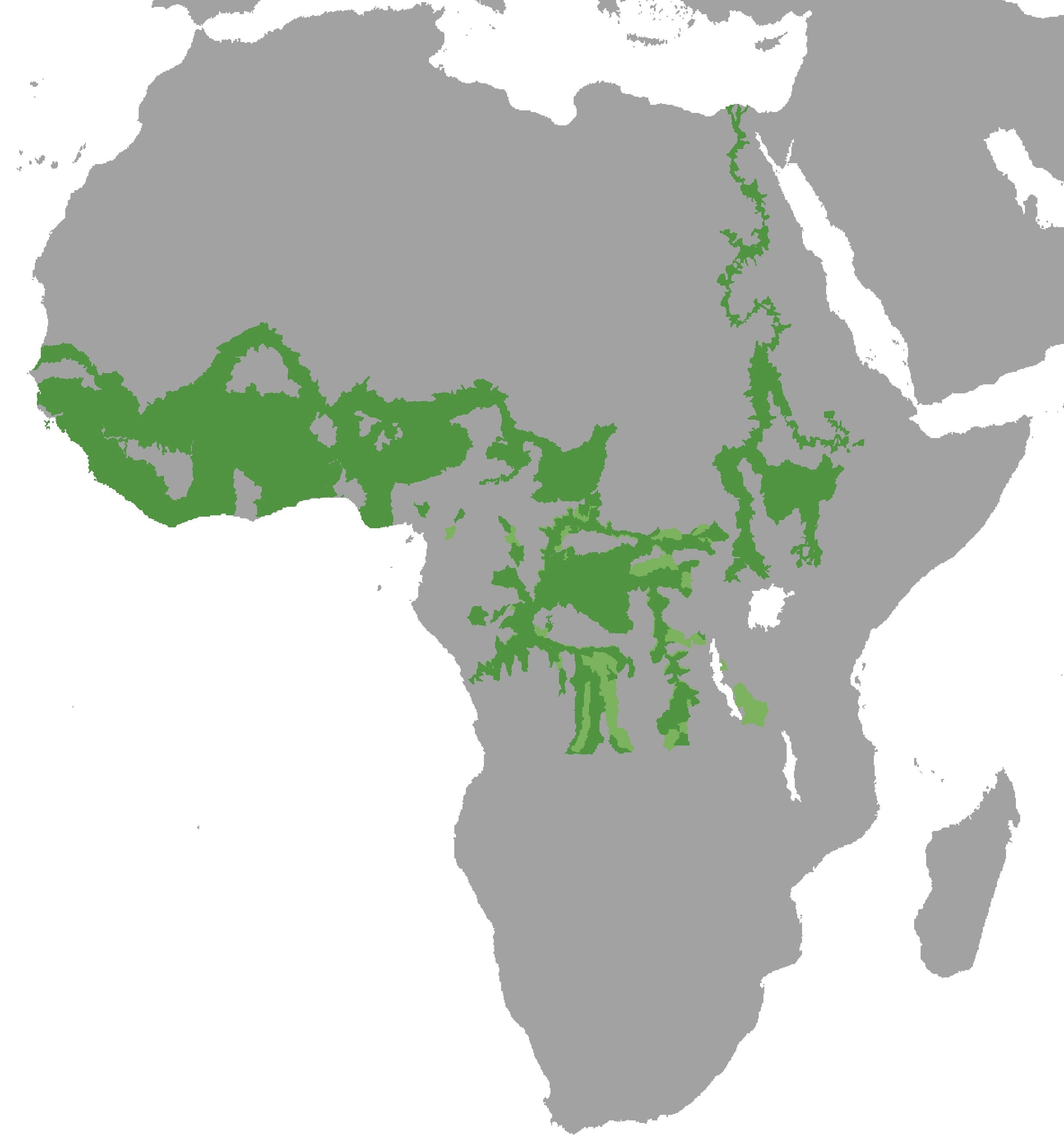

= Polypterus =

Polypterus Temporal range: Lutetian–present

Genus of fishes

Polypterus is a genus of freshwater fish in the bichir family (Polypteridae) of order Polypteriformes. The type species is the Nile bichir (P. bichir). Fish in this genus live in various areas in Africa. Polypterus is the only known vertebrate to have lungs, but no trachea.

The etymology of the genus name derives from a combination of the Greek prefix πολυ-, poly- (many) and the root word πτερον, pteron (wing or fin) – "many fins".

== Taxonomy ==
Despite the ancient origins of the Polypteriformes, the earliest fossils that can be confidently assigned as being of the Polypterus lineage are from the Middle Eocene (Lutetian) of Libya. In addition, studies exclusively using phylogenetic inferences have found that Polypterus may have only diverged from Erpetoichthys during the Neogene.

=== Species ===
The following species are known:

- Polypterus ansorgii Boulenger, 1910 (Guinean bichir)
- Polypterus bichir Lacépède, 1803 (Nile bichir)
  - P. b. lapradei Steindachner, 1869
- Polypterus congicus Boulenger, 1898 (Congo bichir)
- Polypterus delhezi Boulenger, 1899 (Barred bichir)
- Polypterus endlicherii Heckel, 1847 (Saddled bichir)
- Polypterus mokelembembe Schliewen & Schäfer, 2006 (Mokèlé-mbèmbé bichir)
- Polypterus ornatipinnis Boulenger, 1902 (Ornate bichir)
- Polypterus palmas Ayres, 1850 (Shortfin bichir)
- Polypterus polli J. P. Gosse, 1988 (Poll's bichir)
- Polypterus retropinnis Vaillant, 1899 (West African bichir)
- Polypterus senegalus Cuvier, 1829 (Gray bichir)
- Polypterus teugelsi Britz, 2004 (Cross River bichir)
- Polypterus weeksii Boulenger, 1898 (Mottled bichir)

== Discovery ==
Polypterus was discovered, described, and named in 1802 by Étienne Geoffroy Saint-Hilaire. Naturalists were initially unsure whether to regard it as a fish or an amphibian, and if it were to be classified as a fish, it was unclear whether it ought to be regarded as an Actinopterygian, Chondrichthyan, or Sarcopterygian. Around the time following its initial discovery, some entertained the idea of Polypterus as a living fossil representing the "missing link" between fishes and tetrapods, illustrating a transitional form at the midpoint between finned and limbed vertebrates.

In 1861, Thomas Huxley created the order Crossopterygii to house animals, fossil and living, that possessed lungs and fleshy pectoral fins with lobes. He placed Polypterus and Calamoichthys within this order, allocating them to a new tribe, Polypterini, which he created especially for them. The weight of Huxley's authority allowed this allocation to last in textbooks and lectures long after it had been disproved.

In the 1870s and 1880s, Francis Balfour and his students had shown that embryology could help to answer questions about the evolution of species. No one had studied the embryology of Polypterus. Someone who could do this might prove the "missing link" theory and be greatly honoured, but it could be a dangerous quest. The only breeding Polypterus specimens were in swampy parts of African rivers. Africa was a turbulent place and swamps were rich breeding grounds for mosquitoes carrying malaria.

Two men, Nathan Harrington and John Samuel Budgett, attempted to answer this question by making repeated expeditions to Africa. Harrington failed on his first attempt in 1898 and died early on his second in 1899 before he could reach his destination. Budgett failed in 1898/9, 1900, and 1902. He finally succeeded in 1903, but died of blackwater fever shortly after his return to England. He left excellent samples and drawings, but his only writing was a diary. Consequently, his results on Polypterus were written up and published by his friend John Graham Kerr.

Drawing on this work, in 1907, E. S. Goodrich reported to the British Association the then current state of evidence 'against' Polypterus being a crossopterygian, placing it within the palaeoniscids, the most primitive actinopterygians.

Much later, in 1946, Romer confirmed this view, but he also wrote, "The weight of Huxley's [1861] opinion is a heavy one, and even today many a text continues to cite Polypterus as a crossopterygian and it is so described in many a classroom, although students of fish evolution have realized the falsity of this position for many years. ... Polypterus ... is not a crossopterygian, but an actinopterygian, and hence can tell us nothing about crossopterygian anatomy and embryology."

Hall (2001), relying on Patterson (1982) and Noack et al. (1996), writes, "Phylogenetic analyses using both morphological and molecular data affirm Polypterus as a living stem actinopterygian." Research is ongoing. Most of the conclusions drawn by Kerr from Budgett's specimens have been confirmed, but many questions remain.

Polypterus has rarely been bred in captivity. The first success was that of Polypterus senegalus by Arnoult in 1964, a species spawned repeatedly since (see Hartl, 1981; Bartsch and Gemballa, 1992; Bartsch et al., 1997 and Schugardt, 1997).

Shortly after Arnoult's success, a second species, Polypterus ornatipinnis, was spawned by Armbrust for the first time (1966 and 1973) and bred subsequently by Azuma in 1986; Wolf, 1992; Bartsch and Britz, 1996. The third species successfully spawned in captivity was Polypterus endlicheri by Azuma in 1995.

Zoo Basel have been successful in breeding Polypterus in captivity. In December 2005, several eggs were laid, and at the beginning of 2006, six young hatched. Within two months, they reached 10 cm (about 4 in).

In 2014 researchers at McGill University (published in the journal Nature) turned to Polypterus to help show what might have happened when fish first attempted to walk out of the water. The team of researchers raised juvenile Polypterus on land for nearly a year, with the aim of revealing how these 'terrestrialized' fish looked and moved differently.

== Recoil aspiration ==
In shallow water, Polypterus inhales primarily through its spiracle (blowhole). Exhalation is powered by muscles in the torso. During exhalation, the bony scales in the upper chest become indented. When the muscles are relaxed, the bony scales spring back into position, generating negative pressure within the torso, resulting in a rapid intake of air through the spiracle. The air is nearly sufficient to fill the lungs. This is followed by one cycle of buccal (mouth) pumping, which "tops off" the lungs, with the surplus air from the buccal pumping process discharged through the pharynx. According to one hypothesis, Devonian tetrapods may have inhaled in this way.

== Sources ==
"Polypterus". Integrated Taxonomic Information System.

Froese, Rainer; Pauly, Daniel (eds.). "Species in genus Polypterus". FishBase. May 2005 version.

Goodrich, E. S. (1908). On the systematic position of Polypterus. Report of the 77th Meeting of the British Association for the Advancement of Science (1907): 545-546. Quoted by Hall

Hall, B. K. (2001) John Samuel Budgett (1872-1904): In Pursuit of Polypterus, BioScience, Vol. 51, No. 5 (May, 2001), pp. 399–407

Kerr, J.G. (1907), The development of Polypterus senegalus Cuv., Pages 195-290 in Kerr, J.G., (ed. 1907), The Work of John Samuel Budgett, Balfour Student of the University of Cambridge: Being a Collection of His Zoological Papers, together with a Biographical Sketch by A . E. Shipley, F.R.S., and Contributions by Richard Assheton, Edward J.Bles, Edward T. Browne, J. Herbert Budgett and J. Graham Kerr. Cambridge (UK): Cambridge University Press.

Noack K, Zardoya R, Meyer A. 1996. The complete mitochondrial DNA sequence of the bichir (Polypterus ornatipinnis), a basal ray-finned fish: Ancient establishment of the consensus vertebrate gene order. Genetics 144:1165-1180, cited by Hall

Patterson C. (1982). Morphology and interrelationships of primitive actinopterygian fishes. American Zoologist 22: 241-260, cited by Hall.

Romer, A S. (1946). The early evolution of fishes, Quarterly Review of Biology 21: 33-69, cited by Hall
