= Höganäs Formation =

Late Triassic to Early Jurassic geologic formation in Sweden

- Stratigraphic range: Rhaetian-Hettangian; ~205–199 Ma
- Outcrop
- Type: Geological formation
- Unit of: Ängelholm Trought
- Sub-units: Bjuv, Helsingborg & Vallåkra members
- Underlies: Rya Formation
- Overlies: Kågeröd Formation
- Thickness: 200 m

Lithology
- Primary: Sandstone
- Other: Shale, coal

Location
- Coordinates: 56.1°N 12.7°E
- Approximate paleocoordinates: 44.6°N 8.5°E
- Region: Skåne
- Country: Sweden

Type section
- Named by: Troedsson
- Höganäs Formation (Sweden)

The Höganäs Formation is a Late Triassic to Early Jurassic geologic formation in Skåne, Sweden. The formation is mostly known for its incredible flora collection from the Bjuv member, composed of over 110 species, and also includes several vertebrate remains, such as fishes, amphibians and dinosaur tracks & remains, although none have yet been referred to a specific genus. It´s regional equivalent is the Zagaje Formation in Poland.

== Description ==
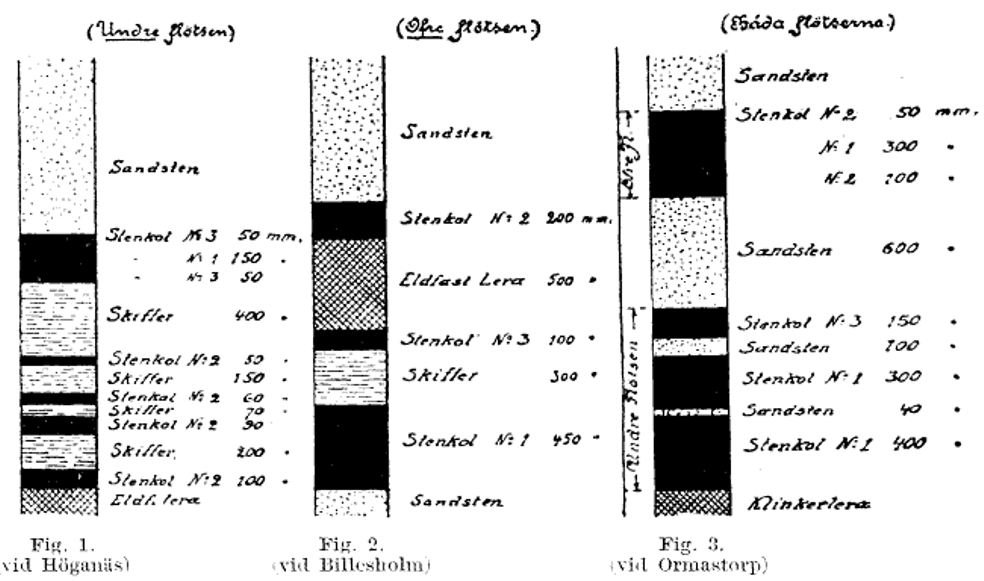
Coal seams of the Höganas Formation

The Höganas Formation was deposited in what is now the southern part of Sweden Skåne. The formation straddles the Triassic-Jurassic boundary and has provided evidence of widespread mire-forest deterioration that began in the latest Rhaetian. The upper part of the Höganas Formation is correlated with the Rønne Formation of Bornholm, which is administered by Denmark. The Hóganas Formation is rich in coal and has provided many fossil flora.

=== Vallåkra Member ===
This member represent the basal part of the Formation, that represents a transition between the terrestrial Kågeröd Formation and the delta dominated coal layers of the Bjuv Member, being made by poorly stratified clay & claystone, mostly green in coloration. The sediments of this member are exposed mostly in the quarry of the town of the same name, where is subdivided on the next levels: 6 m of mixed layers, whose composition includes material seen both on the Kågeröd Formation and this member (red clay and 5 m light clay, 3 m argillaceous sandstone and l m dark clay and several layers composed by Spherosiderite). The uppermost levels are covered by the coal seams of the Bjuv Member. This member has been considered as of Middle and Upper Rhaetian in age.

=== Bjuv Member ===
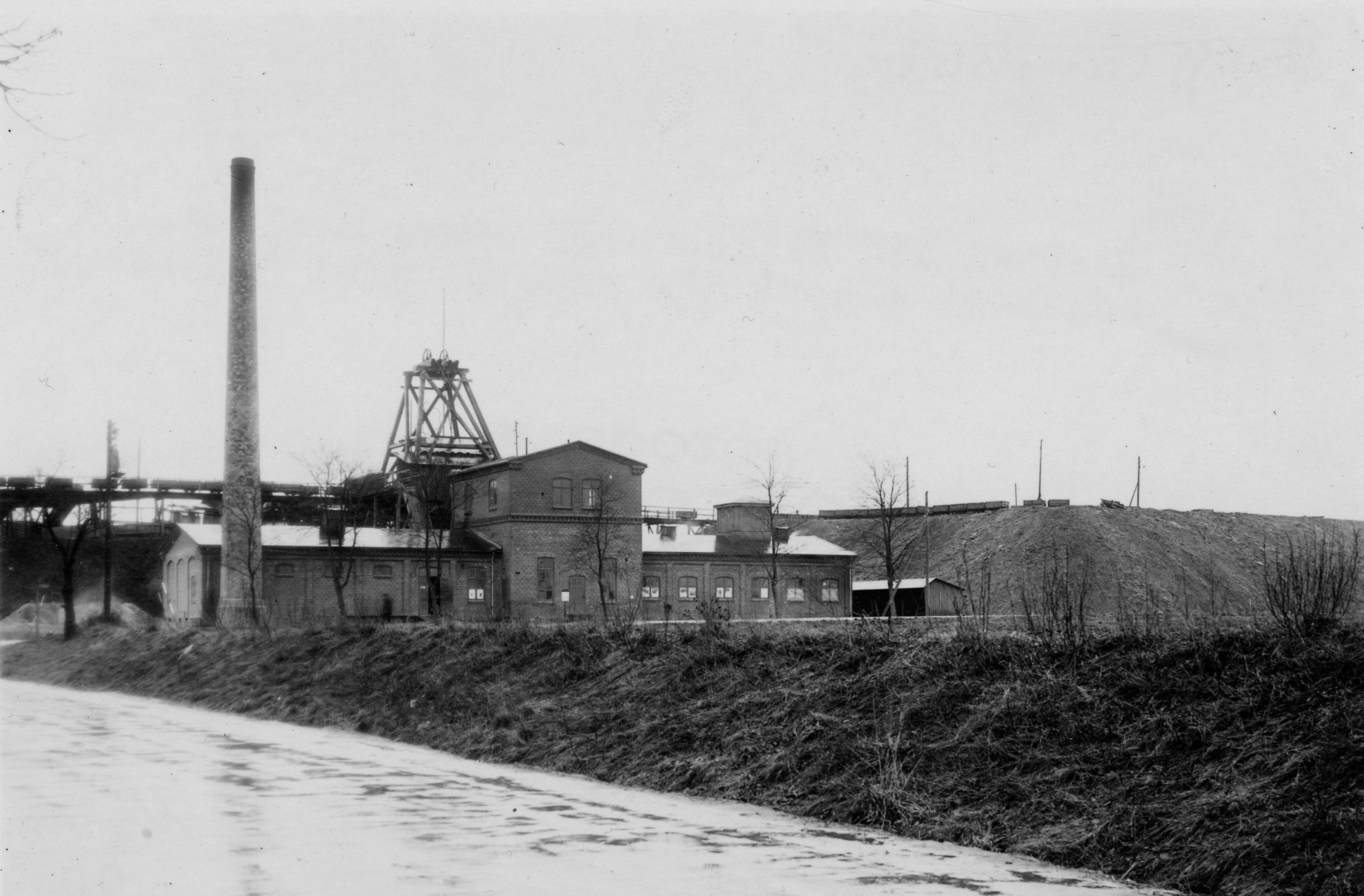
The Norra Albert mine, one of the main outcrops

The second member is the Bjuv Member, known as the most fossiliferous one, that was known originally as the Gruv Member (gruva= mine). Coal and clay have been mined in this area since the fifteenth century, being this intensive mining one of the main reasons the fossiliferous layers have provided such a diverse flora. The Bjuv member is divided on two different seams, the B seam, that overlies the older member and the A seam, that marks the limit with the Helsingborg Member. This layer has a thickness of around 37.22 and 45.72 m in bore No. 256 (stored at the Höganäs Company in Bjuv) from the Bjuv area. The layer is dominated by coarse arenaceous sediments, specially between Billesholm and Höganäs, parallel to the Söderåsen and Kullaberg horsts. Towards the southern part of this area the deposition changes, with an increased abundance of argillaceous contents, specially at places like Skromberga. The age of this member is considered to be Latest Rhaetian and maybe Lower Hettangian. Thus the member records the Triassic–Jurassic extinction, what is seen in the plant oscillations. The Plant fossils found at this layer are one of the main fossil material of the whole Mesozoic in Sweden, composed by more than 110 species, one of the most complete floras of the same age from any location. The main reason for this datation where suggested due to the presence of the plants Lepidopteris ottonis and Thaumatopteris shenki, as well palynological samples that suggested a Middle Rhaetian age (the Rhaetipollis-Limbosporites Miospore Zone). Latter works have fount that the Dinosaur Footprint layers spam between the Rhaetian-Hettangian boundary. Beyond the exceptional flora, the member is also known for fossils of Molluscs, arthropods and fish remains. In the uppermost sequence the deposition changes from a coastal swamp with abundant evidence of plant colonization to fully marine conditions, evidenced by dinoflagellate cysts, recording thus the Rhaetian maximum flooding.

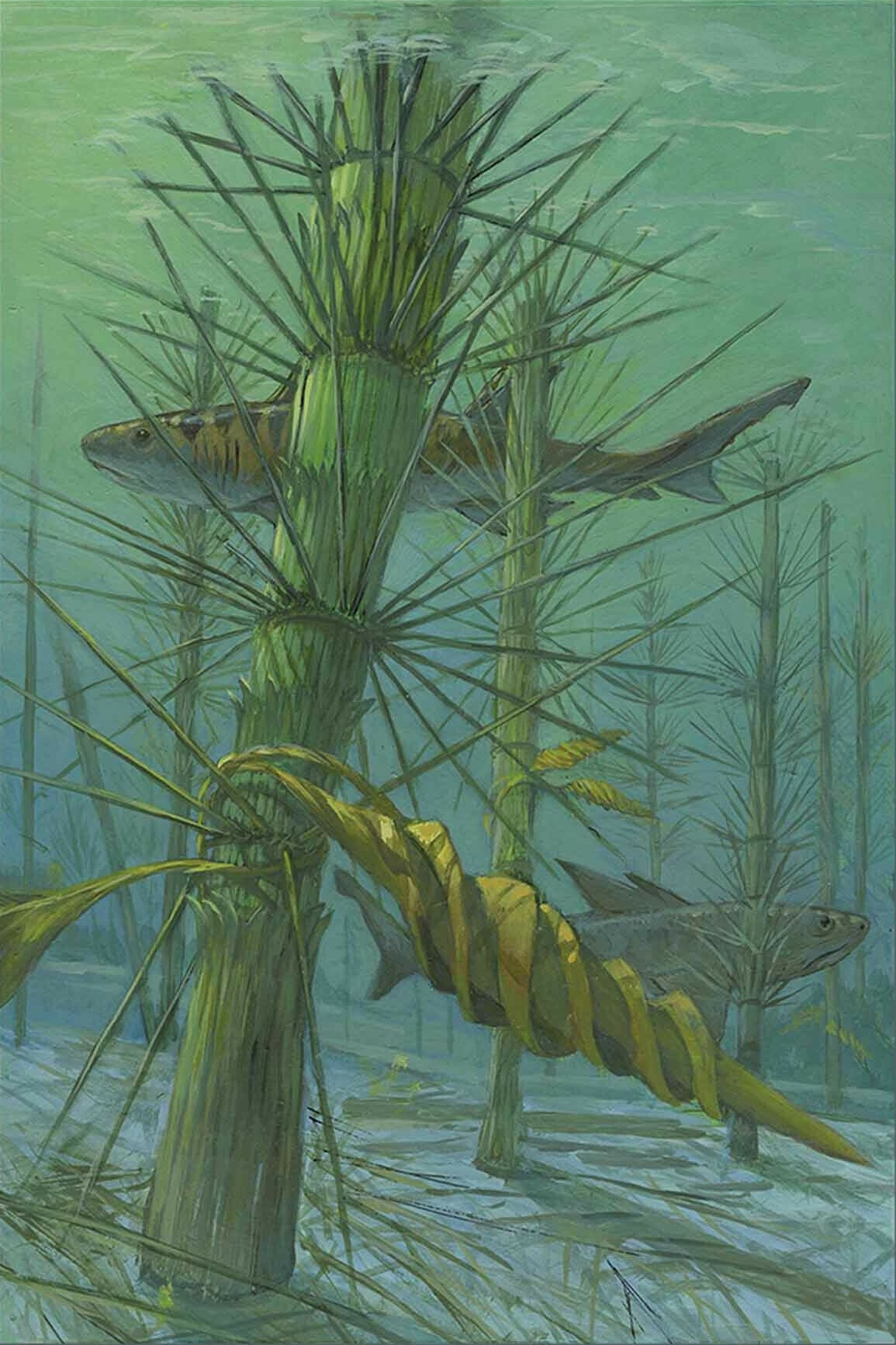
Reconstruction of the estuarine ecosystem with Palaeoxyris

=== Helsingborg Member ===
The Uppermost member of the formation is entirely of Hettangian age, and is the last layer before the start of the deposition of the younger dominant marine Rya Formation. This member is dominated by Deltaic sediments, along several marine interealatians are frequent, with deposition of coarse, in some cases arkosic sandstones in between more fine-grained deposits may indicate Early Kimmerian tectonic movements. The member has a maximunn thickness of 215 m and is divided in 2 parts: Höllviken No. 2 indicated that the lower part starts with up to 12 m of kaolinitic clay succeeded by a 15–20 m thick sequence of cross-bedded arkoses and light-coloured clays, being called Boserup beds or Thaumatopteris schenki zone (Pinuspollenites-Trachysporites Miospore Zone). This beds are known from Boserup, but also from the central part of Helsingborg, the Köpinge No. 3 bore and even extent to the Höganäs region (northwest to Eslöv in the south). This beds are overlain by some metres of arenaceous clays, iron claystone and calcareous sandstone with few intercalation of a coal seam (known as Tågaborg coal seam), where floral remains are also recovered such as Dictyophyllum nilssoni and Equisetites spp. Then the layers turn into 5 m of argillaceous sandstone and 5 m slightly arenaceous clays, with a last 1 m of calcareous sandstone, on a sequence known from cliff series at Laröd-Sofiero at the north of Helsingborg, with plant remains such as Nilssonia polymorpha and Dictyophyllum nilssoni, referred to the Pinuspollenites-Trachysporites zone. It also appears on Rosendal, Fleninge, Farhult and Klappe. Helsingborg (Vossbäumer I 969). There is a coal seam, Tinkarpsflötsen, in the middle part of the sequence. The upper part of the Helsingborg Member starts with a 28 m thick sandstone, with a section known as Fleninge beds, that represent layers where marine ingressions were more common, with the last layers of the formation made up of sandstone, claystone and several minor coal seams.

== Fossil content ==
Color key: Taxon / Reclassified taxon / Taxon falsely reported as present / Dubious taxon or junior synonym / Ichnotaxon / Ootaxon / Morphotaxon

Notes
Uncertain or tentative taxa are in small text
~~crossed out~~ taxa are discredited.

=== Ichnofossils ===
Genus	Species	Location	Material	Made By
Aulichnites	A. isp	Bjuv; Hyllinge; Farhult; Klappe; Oregården; Rosendal	Dwelling structures	Gastropods
Diplichnites	D. ispp.	Bjuv; Hyllinge; Farhult; Klappe; Oregården; Rosendal	Hypichnial trackway	Arachnids; Insects; Isopods; Myriapods; Xiphosurans
Diplocraterion	D. parallelum; D. ispp.	Bjuv; Hyllinge; Farhult; Klappe; Oregården; Rosendal	U-Shaped Burrows	Annelids; Crustaceans; Insects; Phoronids; Fish
Lockeia	L. siliquaria	Bjuv; Hyllinge; Farhult; Klappe; Oregården; Rosendal	Dwelling traces	Bivalves
Monocraterion	M. tentaculatum	Bjuv; Hyllinge; Farhult; Klappe; Oregården; Rosendal	U-Shaped Burrows	Echiurans; Enteropneustans; Polychaeta; Sipuncula
Planolites	P. annularis; P. montanus	Bjuv; Hyllinge; Farhult; Klappe; Oregården; Rosendal	Horizontal burrows	Annelids; Bivalves; Crustaceans
Rhizocorallium	R. ispp.	Bjuv; Hyllinge; Farhult; Klappe; Oregården; Rosendal	Tubular Fodinichnia	Annelids; Crustaceans; Insects
Skolithos	S. isp.	Bjuv; Hyllinge; Farhult; Klappe; Oregården; Rosendal	Sac/Bottle shaped burrows	Annelids; Crustaceans; Insects
Teichichnus	T. isp.	Bjuv; Hyllinge; Farhult; Klappe; Oregården; Rosendal	Dwelling traces	Echiurans; Holothurians; Polychaetes

=== Annelida ===
Genus	Species	Stratigraphic position	Member	Material	Notes	Images
Burejospermum	B. crassitestum	Bjuv	Bjuv member	Cocoons	Freshwater Clitellata Cocoons (Oligochaeta and Hirudinea).	Modern leech cocoon
"Cycadeospermum"	"C." sp.	Bjuv	Bjuv member	Cocoons	Freshwater Clitellata Cocoons (Oligochaeta and Hirudinea).	Modern leech cocoon
Dictyothylakos	D. pesslerae; D. sp.	Bjuv	Bjuv member	Cocoons	Freshwater Clitellata Cocoons (Oligochaeta and Hirudinea).	Modern leech cocoon

=== Mollusks ===
Genus	Species	Location	Stratigraphic position	Material	Notes	Images
Avicula	A. nilssoni	Rosendal; Farhult; Oregården; Klappe	Bjuv member; Helsingborg member	Shells	An Oyster member of Pteriidae	
Cardinia	C. ingelensis	Rosendal; Farhult; Oregården; Klappe	Bjuv member; Helsingborg member	Shells	A Clam member of Cardiniidae inside Carditida.	
Ceratomya	C. stensioei	Hyllinge	Bjuv member	Shells	A piddock member of Ceromyidae.	
Cercomya	C. carlsoni	Bjuv	Bjuv member	Shells	A piddock member of Ceromyidae.	
Chemnitzia	C. sp.	Vallåkra	Vallåkra Member	Shells	A sea snail member of Turbonillinae.	
Eutrapetzium	E. pullastra; E. hyllingense	Rosendal; Farhult; Hyllinge; Oregården; Klappe	Bjuv member; Helsingborg member	Shells	An Oyster member of Ostreidae. The local material assigned to this genus is now lost	
Gervillia	G. angelini; G. praecursor	Rosendal; Farhult; Oregården; Klappe; Vallåkra	Vallåkra Member; Bjuv member; Helsingborg member	Shells	An Oyster member of Bakevelliidae	
Liostrea	L. hisingeri	Bjuv; Rosendal; Farhult; Oregården; Klappe; Helsingborg	Bjuv member; Helsingborg member	Shells	An Oyster member of Ostreidae . The most common Bivalve found locally.	Example of Liostrea specimens
Mesodesma	M. germari	Rosendal; Farhult; Oregården; Klappe	Bjuv member; Helsingborg member	Shells	A Clam member of Mesodesmatidae inside Venerida.	
Modiolus	M. hoffinanni; M. minutus; M. sp.	Farhult; Klappe; Helsingborg; Oregården; Rosendal; Skromberga; Svanebeck	Bjuv member; Helsingborg member	Shells	A Mussel member of Mytilidae.	Example of extant Modiolus
Mya	M. ovalis; M. elongatus	Rosendal; Farhult; Oregården; Klappe	Bjuv member; Helsingborg member	Shells	A Clam member of Myidae inside Myida.	
Pecten	P. sp.	Vallåkra	Vallåkra Member	Shells	A scallop member of Pectinidae.	Example of extant Pecten
Pleuromya	P. aquarum; P. suevica	Rosendal; Farhult; Oregården; Klappe; Skromberga; Vallåkra	Vallåkra Member; Bjuv member; Helsingborg member	Shells	A Clam member of Pleuromyidae inside Myida.	
Protocardia	P. eicaldi; P. praecursor; P. rhaetica; P. suecica; P. sp.	Rosendal; Farhult; Oregården; Klappe; Vallåkra	Vallåkra Member; Bjuv member; Helsingborg member	Shells	A Clam member of Protocardiinae inside Carditida.	
Venerupis	V. elongala; V. herberti	Rosendal; Farhult; Oregården; Klappe	Bjuv member; Helsingborg member	Shells	A Clam member of Veneridae inside Venerida.	Example of extant Venerupis

=== Insecta ===
Genus	Species	Location	Stratigraphic position	Material	Notes	Images
Angelinella	A. angelini	Höganäs	Bjuv member	Elytrons	A beetle, incertae sedis Archostemata	
Heeriaopsis	H. laevigatum	Höganäs	Bjuv member	Elytrons	A beetle, incertae sedis Archostemata	
Nannocurculionites	N. carlsoni	Bjuv	Bjuv member	Elytrons	A beetle, incertae sedis Archostemata. Originally identified as Curculionites carlsoni	
Parabuprestites	P. rugulosus	Bjuv	Bjuv member	Elytrons	A Beetle, member of the family Cupedidae. Originally identified as Buprestites rugulosus	Extant similar relative, Tenomerga.
Pseudocarabites	P. deplanatus	Bjuv	Bjuv member	Elytrons	A Beetle, member of the family Carabidae. Originally identified as Carabites deplanatus.	Extant similar relative
Pseudohydrophilites	P. nathorsti	Bjuv	Bjuv member	Elytrons	A Beetle, member of the family Schizocoleidae. Originally identified as Hydrophilites nathorsti.	

=== Fish ===
Genus	Species	Location	Stratigraphic position	Material	Notes	Images
Hybodus	H. sp.	Helsingborg	Helsingborg member	Isolated Teeth	A freshwater/marine member of Hybodontidae.	Hybodus
Hyllingea	H. swanbergi	Hyllinge	Bjuv member	Two flattened fossils, both almost 62 cm in length.	A freshwater member of the family Acrolepidae or Ptycholepiformes.	
Lissodus	L. sp.	Helsingborg	Helsingborg member	Isolated Teeth	A freshwater/marine member of Lonchidiidae.	
Palaeoxyris	P. muensteri	Bjuv; Helsingborg	Bjuv member; Helsingborg member	Shark eggs Capsules	Freshwater shark egg capsule associated with Neocalamites, likely produced by members of Hybodontidae.	
Parvodus	P. sp.	Helsingborg	Helsingborg member	Isolated Teeth	A freshwater/marine member of Lonchidiidae.	
Saurichthys	S. acuminatus	Bjuv	Bjuv member	Specimen preserved in an slab; referred scales & Teeth	A freshwater member of the family Saurichthyidae.	Saurichthys
Scanilepis	S. dubia	Bjuv	Bjuv member (Rhaetian)	Almost complete large (110 cm); Isolated specimen (200 cm) which is a counter-impression	A freshwater member of the family Scanilepididae.	
Semionotus	S. nilssoni	Bjuv; Boserup	Bjuv member	Specimen preserved in an slab; referred scales & Teeth	A freshwater member of the family Semionotidae.	Semionotus

=== Amphibia ===
Genus	Species	Location	Stratigraphic position	Material	Notes	Images
Gerrothorax	G. pulcherrimus	Coal-mine at Bjuv	Bjuv member	LU 3176T, LU 3176aT, LU 3176bT, postcrania including interclavicles and clavicles, vertebrae and osteoderms; referred NR B2–4, partial skull & NR B18a, b, c, d, e, postcranial remains	An amphibian, member of the family Plagiosauridae.	G. pulcherrimus

=== Amniotes ===
Tracks discovered in the Höganäs Formation have been assigned to the ichnogenus Grallator (Eubrontes) cf. giganteus, which were discovered in Rhaetian strata, and Grallator (Eubrontes) soltykovensis, which were discovered in Hettangian strata. A few of the tracks were taken to museums, but most of them disappeared in natural floodings.

After the end of a seven-year excavation project at Billesholm, researchers announced on 13 October 2022 the identification of seven dinosaur species based on fossil remains, out of which three species were new to science. The fossils are yet to be analyzed and scientifically published. Overall 8000 finds include footprints of both carnivorous and herbivorous dinosaurs and 4 tonnes of fossil material that went to Uppsala.

Genus	Species	Location	Stratigraphic position	Material	Notes	Images
Dinosauria? indet.	Indeterminate	Höganäs mine	Helsingborg member	Vertebral column (not collected)	Incertae sedis	
Eubrontes	E. giganteus	Gustaf Adolf mine; Helsingborg tunnel; Höganäs; Bjuv	Bjuv Member (Rhaetian)	Footprints	Eubrontes tracks were likely made by Dilophosaurus-like theropods.	Cast of Eubrontes footprint
Kayentapus	K. soltykovensis	Southern quarry at Vallåkra	Helsingborg Member (Hettangian)	Footprints	The footprints are small-sized, tridactyl and relatively narrow. Likely made by Coelophysidae-like dinosaurs.	Footprint at Höganäs (Højenæs) Museum.
Plesiosaur? indet.	Indeterminate	Billesholm mine	Helsingborg member	4 dorsal vertebrae	Suggested to be an indeterminate small theropod or a mistaken Plesiosaur.	
Thyreophora? indet.	Indeterminate	Gustaf Adolf mine	Bjuv Member (Rhaetian)	Footprints	Suggested that it was left by an early advanced thyreophoran dinosaur, in this case the earliest known.	Probable thyreophoran track from the Gustav Adolf Mine

== Flora ==
Local environments consisted on wetlands with abundant hosting ferns, cypress and the extinct conifer family Cheirolepidiaceae.

Genus	Species	Stratigraphic position	Member	Material	Notes	Images
Allicospermum	A. spp.	Coal-mine at Bjuv; Rögla area	Bjuv Member	Seeds	Ginkgoaceae Ginkgoales.	
Anomozamites	A. minor; A. gracilis; A. marginatus; A. angustifolius; A. intermedium	Coal-mine at Bjuv; Helsingborg Harbour; Rögla area	Bjuv Member; Helsingborg Member	Leaflets	Williamsoniaceae Bennettitales.	
Antherangiopsis	A. rediviva	Coal-mine at Bjuv	Bjuv Member	Leaflets	Cycadales Cycadopsida.	
Antevsia	A. zeilleri	Coal-mine at Bjuv; Hyllinge	Bjuv Member	Reproductive structure	Peltaspermaceae Pteridospermatophyta.	
Baiera	B. taeniata	Coal-mine at Bjuv	Bjuv Member; Helsingborg Member	Isolated Leaves	Ginkgoaceae Ginkgoales.	Baiera
Beania	B. carruthersi	Coal-mine at Bjuv	Bjuv Member	Reproductive structure	Cycadales Cycadopsida.	
Brachyphyllum	B. sp. cf. B. crucis	Coal-mine at Bjuv; Rögla area	Bjuv Member; Helsingborg Member	Leave Compressions	Hirmeriellaceae Pinales.	
Bjuvia	B. simplex	Coal-mine at Bjuv	Bjuv Member	Leaflets	Cycadales Cycadopsida.	Bjuvia
Camptopteris	C. spiralis; C. incisa	Coal-mine at Bjuv; Rögla area	Bjuv Member	Isolated pinnae	Matoniaceae Gleicheniales.	
Camptophyllum	C. schimperi	Coal-mine at Bjuv	Bjuv Member; Helsingborg Member	Stems	Likely Lycopodiopsida.	
Ctenis	C. nilssonii; C. minuta; C. latepinnata; C. laxa	Coal-mine at Bjuv	Bjuv Member; Helsingborg Member	Leaflets	Cycadales Cycadopsida.	
Ctenopteris	C. cycadea	Coal-mine at Bjuv	Bjuv Member	Isolated pinnae	Polypodiaceae Polypodiales.	
Cladophlebis	C. svedbergii; C. scoresbyensis; C. cf. nebbensis; C. cf. spectabilis; C. arguta; C. sublobata; C. sewardii; C. divaricata	Coal-mine at Bjuv; Helsingborg Harbour; Hyllinge	Bjuv Member; Helsingborg Member	Isolated pinnae	Osmundaceae Osmundales.	Cladophlebis
Clathropteris	C. meniscioides	Coal-mine at Bjuv; Hyllinge	Bjuv Member	Isolated pinnae	Dipteridaceae Polypodiales.	
Cycadites	C. longiolius	Coal-mine at Bjuv	Bjuv Member; Helsingborg Member	Leaflets	Cycadales Cycadopsida.	
Cycadinocarpus	C. erdmanni	Coal-mine at Bjuv	Bjuv Member; Helsingborg Member	Seeds	Cycadales Cycadopsida.	
Cycadolepis	C. giganteus; C. blomquisti	Coal-mine at Bjuv	Bjuv Member	Leaflets	Cycadales Cycadopsida.	
Cycadocephalus	C. sewardi	Coal-mine at Bjuv	Bjuv Member	Seeds	Cycadales Cycadopsida.	
Cycadospadix	C. integer	Coal-mine at Bjuv	Bjuv Member	Seeds	Cycadales Cycadopsida.	
Cyparissidium	C. nilssonianum	Coal-mine at Bjuv; Rögla area	Bjuv Member	Fragmentary axis compressions with preserved leaves	Either Cupressales or Palissyales	
Czekanowskia	C. setacea; C. nathorsti; C. sp.	Coal-mine at Bjuv; Stabbarp	Bjuv Member; Helsingborg Member	Reproductive Organs	Czekanowskiales Ginkgoales.	
Danaeopsis	D. fecunda	Coal-mine at Bjuv; Hyllinge	Bjuv Member; Helsingborg Member	Isolated pinnae	Marattiidae Marattiales.	
Desmiophyllum	D. cyclostomum	Coal-mine at Bjuv; Rögla area	Bjuv Member	Isolated Leaves	Incertade Sedis, maybe Palissyales	
Dictyophyllum	D. nilssoni; D. müensteri; D. exile	Coal-mine at Bjuv; Rögla area	Bjuv Member	Isolated pinnae	Dipteridaceae Polypodiales.	
Dioonites	D. spectabilis	Coal-mine at Bjuv	Bjuv Member	Leaflets	Cycadales Cycadopsida.	
Doratophyllum	D. astartensis; D. scanicum	Coal-mine at Bjuv	Bjuv Member	Leaflets	Cycadales Cycadopsida.	
Elatocladus	E. cephalotaxoides; E. sp. cf. Palissya sphenolepis; E. conferta	Coal-mine at Bjuv; Rögla area	Bjuv Member; Helsingborg Member	Fragmentary axis compressions with preserved leaves	Either Cupressales or Palissyales.	
Equisetites	E. laevis; E. praelongus; E. müensteri; E. subulatus; E. beani; E. scanicus; E. mobergii; E (Equisetostachys) nathorsti; E (Equisetostachys) suecicus; E. gracilis; E. spp	Coal-mine at Bjuv; Rögla area	Bjuv Member; Helsingborg Member	Stems	Equisetaceae Equisetales.	
Ginkgoites	G. troedsonii; G. obovatus; G. marginatus; G. sp. cf. G. marginatus	Coal-mine at Bjuv; Helsingborg Harbour; Rögla area	Bjuv Member; Helsingborg Member	Leave Compressions	Ginkgoaceae Ginkgoales.	Ginkgoites
Harrisiothecium	H. marsilioides	Coal-mine at Bjuv; Helsingborg Harbour; Hyllinge	Bjuv Member; Helsingborg Member	Pollen organ	Corystospermaceae Pteridospermatophyta.	
Hausmannia	H. forchhammeri; H. dentata; H. lasciniata	Coal-mine at Bjuv	Bjuv Member; Helsingborg Member	Isolated pinnae	Dipteridaceae Polypodiales.	
Hydropterangium	H. hyllingensis	Coal-mine at Bjuv; Helsingborg Harbour; Hyllinge	Bjuv Member; Helsingborg Member	Pollen organ	Corystospermaceae Pteridospermatophyta.	
Komlopteris	K. nordenskioeldii	Coal-mine at Bjuv	Bjuv Member	Isolated pinnae	Corystospermaceae Pteridospermatophyta.	
Lepidopteris	L. ottonis	Coal-mine at Bjuv; Helsingborg Harbour	Bjuv Member; Helsingborg Member	Isolated pinnae	Peltaspermaceae Pteridospermatophyta.	Lepidopteris
Lycopodites	L. scanicus	Coal-mine at Bjuv; Hyllinge	Bjuv Member	Stems	Lycopodiaceae Lycopodiales.	
Lycostrobus	L. scottii	Coal-mine at Bjuv; Helsingborg Harbour; Hyllinge	Bjuv Member; Helsingborg Member	Stems and cones	The youngest Pleuromiales.	Lycostrobus
Marattiopsis	M. crenulatus	Coal-mine at Bjuv; Helsingborg Harbour; Hyllinge	Bjuv Member; Helsingborg Member	Isolated pinnae	Marattiidae Marattiales	
Neocalamites	N. hoerensis; N. lehmannianus; N. sp.	Coal-mine at Bjuv; Rögla area	Bjuv Member; Helsingborg Member	Stems	Neocalamiteceae Equisetales	
Nilssonia	N. münsteri; N. acuminata; N. polymorpha; N. pterophylloides; N. brevis; N. fallax; N. pumila; N. spp.	Coal-mine at Bjuv; Helsingborg Harbour; Hyllinge	Bjuv Member; Helsingborg Member	Leaflets	Cycadeoidaceae Bennettitales.	
Nilssoniopteris	N. vittata; N. spp.	Coal-mine at Bjuv; Hyllinge	Bjuv Member	Leaflets	Cycadeoidaceae Bennettitales.	
Palaeotaxus	P. rediviva	Coal-mine at Bjuv	Bjuv Member	Leafy shoots with attached seed-bearing structures	The oldest Taxaceae.	
Palissya	P. braunii; P. sphenolepis	Coal-mine at Bjuv; Rögla area	Bjuv Member	Cones	Palissyales Pinales.	
Peltaspermum	P. rotula	Coal-mine at Bjuv; Hyllinge	Bjuv Member	Reproductive structure	Peltaspermaceae Pteridospermatophyta.	
Phlebopteris	P. muensteri; P. angustiloba; P. polypodioides; P. spp.	Coal-mine at Bjuv; Rögla area	Bjuv Member; Helsingborg Member	Isolated pinnae	Matoniaceae Gleicheniales.	Phlebopteris
Podozamites	P. lanceolatus; P. distans; P. ovalis; P. angustifolius; P. cuspiformis	Coal-mine at Bjuv; Helsingborg Harbour	Bjuv Member; Helsingborg Member	Isolated Leaves	Krassiloviaceae Voltziales.	Podozamites
Ptilozamites	P. blasii; P. carlsonii; P. heeri; P. nilssonii; P. sp. cf. P. nilssonii	Coal-mine at Bjuv; Helsingborg Harbour; Hyllinge; Rögla area	Bjuv Member; Helsingborg Member	Isolated pinnae	Corystospermaceae Pteridospermatophyta.	
Pseudoctenis	P. florinii	Coal-mine at Bjuv	Bjuv Member	Leaflets	Cycadeoidaceae Bennettitales.	
Pseudotorellia	P. nordenskioeldii; P. minuta; P. spp.	Coal-mine at Bjuv; Hyllinge; Rögla area	Bjuv Member; Helsingborg Member	Leave Compressions	Ginkgoaceae Ginkgoales.	
Pterophyllum	P. majus; P. kochii; P. aequale; P. subaequale; P. ptilum; P. compressum	Coal-mine at Bjuv; Helsingborg Harbour; Hyllinge; Rögla area	Bjuv Member; Helsingborg Member	Leaflets	Williamsoniaceae Bennettitales.	
Pterygopteris	P. angelini	Coal-mine at Bjuv; Hyllinge	Bjuv Member; Helsingborg Member	Isolated pinnae	Osmundaceae Osmundales.	
Rhaphidopteris	R. (Stenopteris) spp.	Coal-mine at Bjuv	Bjuv Member	Isolated pinnae	Corystospermaceae Pteridospermatophyta.	
Rhizomopteris	R. cruciata; R. schenki	Coal-mine at Bjuv	Bjuv Member	Isolated pinnae	Dipteridaceae Polypodiales.	
Sagenopteris	S. nilssoniana; S. isundulata; S. rhoifolia; S. undulata	Coal-mine at Bjuv; Helsingborg Harbour; Hyllinge	Bjuv Member; Helsingborg Member	Isolated pinnae	Caytoniaceae Pteridospermatophyta.	Sagenopteris
Schizolepis	S. hörensis	Coal-mine at Bjuv	Bjuv Member	Ovulate Strobili	Schizolepisaceae Pinaceae.	
Selaginellites	S. hallei	Coal-mine at Bjuv	Bjuv Member	Stems	Selaginellaceae Selaginellales.	
Simplicioxylon	S. hungaricum	Skromberga	Bjuv Member	Wood	Hirmeriellaceae Pinales.	
Sorosaccus	S. gracilis	Coal-mine at Bjuv; Rögla area	Bjuv Member	Leave Compressions	Ginkgoaceae Ginkgoales.	
Sphenobaiera	S. paucipartita; S. sp.	Coal-mine at Bjuv; Rögla area	Bjuv Member	Leave Compressions	Ginkgoaceae Ginkgoales.	
Stachyotaxus	S. septentrionalis; S. elegans	Coal-mine at Bjuv; Helsingborg Harbour; Rögla area	Bjuv Member; Helsingborg Member	Isolated Leaves	Palissyaceae Palissyales.	
Stenorachis	S. scanicus; S. solmsi; S. dubius	Coal-mine at Bjuv	Bjuv Member	Reproductive Organs	Cycadeoidaceae Bennettitales.	
Swedenborgia	S. cryptomeroides	Coal-mine at Bjuv; Helsingborg Harbour	Bjuv Member; Helsingborg Member	Isolated Leaves	Krassiloviaceae Voltziales.	
Thaumatopteris	T. schenkii; T. brauniana	Coal-mine at Bjuv; Helsingborg Harbour	Bjuv Member; Helsingborg Member	Isolated pinnae	Dipteridaceae Polypodiales.	
Todites	T. goeppertianus; T. sp. cf. T. williamsonii	Coal-mine at Bjuv; Helsingborg Harbour; Rögla area	Bjuv Member; Helsingborg Member	Isolated pinnae	Osmundaceae Osmundales.	
Wielandiella	W. punctata; W. angustifolia	Coal-mine at Bjuv; Helsingborg Harbour	Bjuv Member; Helsingborg Member	Female Bennetite "flower"	Williamsoniaceae Bennettitales.	Wielandiella

== See also ==
- List of fossiliferous stratigraphic units in Sweden
- Rya Formation
- Djupadal Formation
- Höör Sandstone
- Zagaje Formation
- List of dinosaur-bearing rock formations
  - List of stratigraphic units with indeterminate dinosaur fossils
