= Cow Branch Formation =

Geologic formation in the eastern U.S.

- Stratigraphic range: mid-Norian? 221–217 Ma
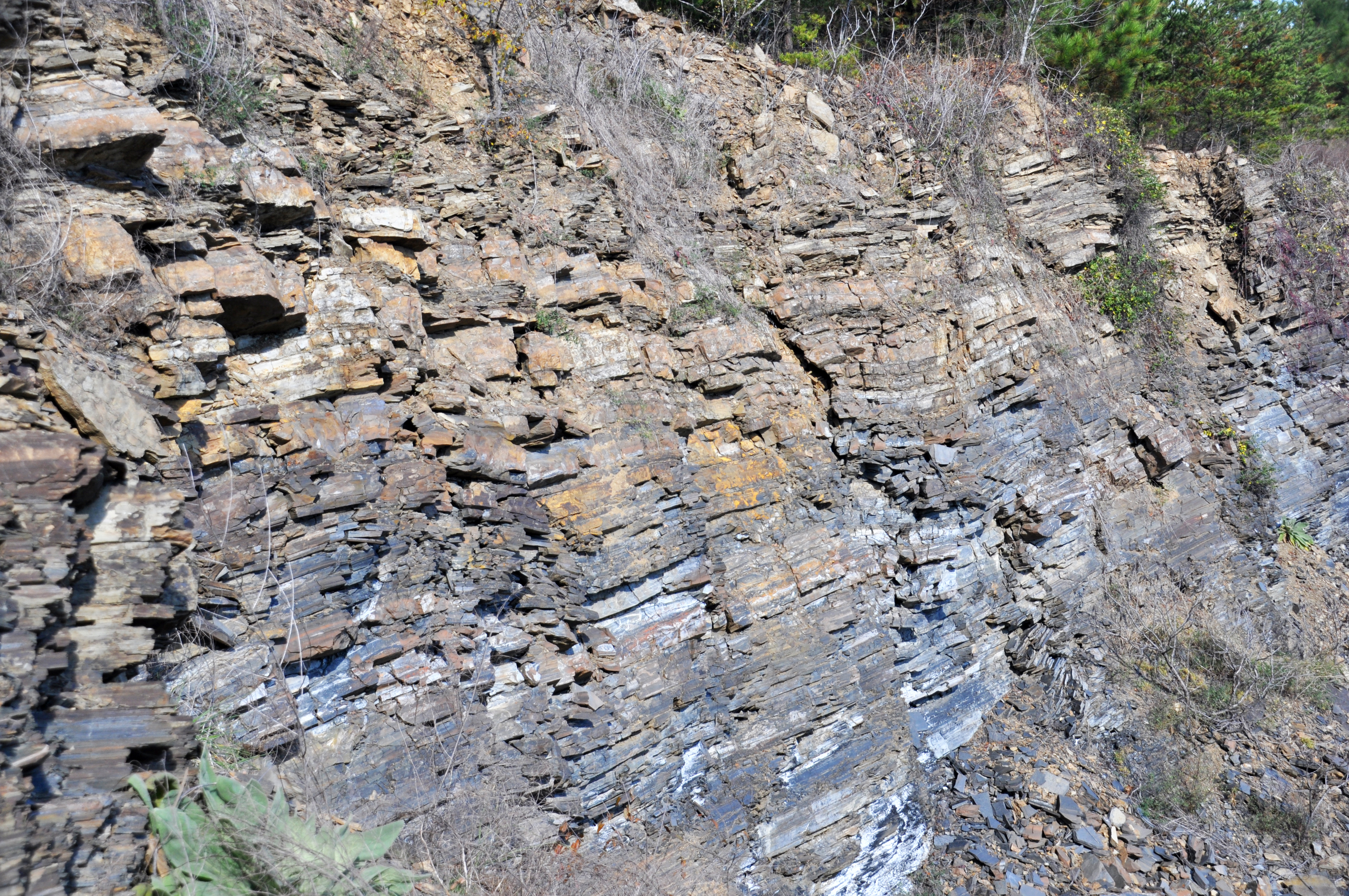
- Outcrop of the formation along the northwest wall of Solite Quarry Pit B in North Carolina
- Type: Geological formation
- Unit of: Dan River Group
- Underlies: Stoneville Formation
- Overlies: Dry Fork Formation
- Thickness: 1900 m

Location
- Coordinates: 36.4°N 80.0°W
- Approximate paleocoordinates: 5.5°N 20.4°W
- Region: Virginia
- Country: United States

Type section
- Named by: Thayer, 1970
- Cow Branch Formation (the United States) Cow Branch Formation (North Carolina)

The Cow Branch Formation is a Late Triassic geologic formation in Virginia and North Carolina in the eastern United States. The formation consists of cyclical beds of black and grey lacustrine (lake) mudstone and shale. It is a konservat-lagerstätte renowned for its exceptionally preserved insect fossils, along with small reptiles, fish, and plants. Dinosaur tracks have also been reported from the formation.

== Geology ==
=== Regional setting ===
The Cow Branch Formation is exposed in the Dan River-Danville Basin, a narrow half-graben which extends across the border of Virginia and North Carolina in the eastern United States. The basin has also been termed the Danville Basin (emphasizing the northern portion in Virginia) or the Dan River Basin (emphasizing the southern portion, in North Carolina). It is one of many Triassic-Jurassic rift basins stretching from northeast to southwest in eastern North America, collectively described as the Newark Supergroup.

The Cow Branch Formation was initially distinguished by Meyertons (1963), working in the Virginian portion of the basin. He considered it to be a member of the Leaksville Formation, a name which encompassed almost all Triassic sediment in the basin. Thayer (1970), working in North Carolina, split up the Leaksville Formation and raised its members to formation status within the Dan River Group. Thayer divided the Cow Branch Formation into dark-colored upper and lower members, divided by a series of red sediments. The lower member has subsequently been renamed to the Walnut Cove Formation, with the intervening red sediment named as the Dry Fork Formation. In its modern conception, the Cow Branch Formation lies above the Dry Fork Formation and below the Stoneville Formation.

The type section of the Cow Branch Formation was a former roadcut along Virginia Route 856, in Pittsylvania County southeast of Cascade. A new lectostratotype was proposed in 2015: a large stone quarry extending across the state line by the Dan River near Eden, North Carolina. This quarry, commonly known as the Solite Quarry, is technically a cluster of three quarry pits, one in Pittsylvania County, Virginia and two in Rockingham County, North Carolina. The site is home to the most extensive and fossiliferous exposures of the formation. Exceptionally-preserved fossils were first reported from the site in 1978, and collection has continued to the present.

=== Sedimentology and paleoenvironment ===
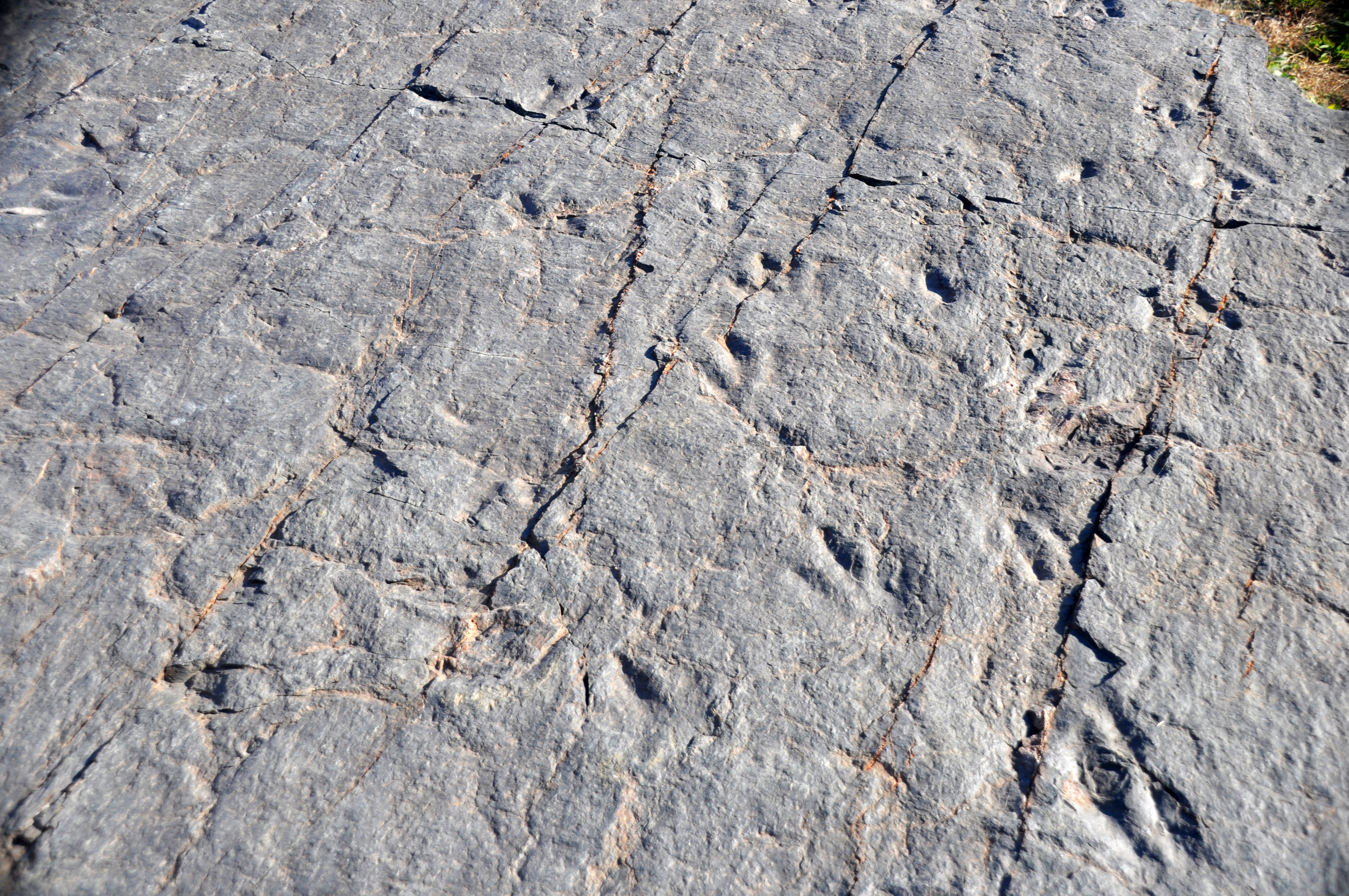
A relatively coarse-grained slab at the Solite Quarry, preserving numerous dinosaur footprints (Grallator)

The sediments of the Cow Branch Formation are dark grey to black in color and generally fine-grained. Blocky mudstones and thinly-laminated shale are the most common lithologies. The formation is thickest and most fine-grained at the state line, approximately in the middle of its exposed area. Here, the formation is about 1,900 metres (6,200 ft) thick. Coarser sediments such as dark grey sandstone are more prevalent to the southeast and northwest, though periodic black mudstone beds are still frequently encountered. Color is the most useful metric for distinguishing the Cow Branch Formation in the field, as red and purple sediments are practically absent, unlike the Dry Fork and Stoneville formations.

The Cow Branch Formation represents a lacustrine (lake) system in a warm tropical climate, only around 2° to 4° north of the equator. Deposition preceded at an estimated rate of around 46.3 cm/kyr. Bioturbation is almost completely absent, indicating that the lake bed was uninhabited by burrowing animals. Insect-bearing fossil layers were likely completely freshwater while the fish-bearing layers may have been somewhat saltier. As in modern rift lakes, high water levels could have initiated brine seeps along the edge of the basin, adding sodium into the lake system. Quartz is conspicuously absent even from the siliciclastic layers, having been replaced with albite (high-sodium feldspar) through diagenetic processes.

The high frequency of dolomite in the formation indicates that the lake was strongly alkaline, with its water saturated with magnesium supplied from older carbonate rocks in the area. The lack of bioturbation, mudcracks, or root casts has traditionally been taken as evidence that the waters were deep enough to be continually stratified, with the hypolimnion (deepest portion) completely lacking oxygen. An alternative hypothesis suggests that the lake was rather shallow, albeit still deep enough to have been permanent during the formation's deposition. This is supported by the abundance of dolomite, a mineral which forms most easily in salty shallow-water environments. In addition, the insect-bearing layers nearly lack organic carbon, suggesting that the lakebed was fully oxygenated even at its deepest extent. The lake sediments have a high concentration of fluorine, a fact which may help to resolve the near-absence of bioturbators. As with excessive salinity, excessive fluorine can be toxic for fully aquatic organisms (including bioturbators and freshwater plants), but air-breathing insects can persevere and thrive close to the shoreline.

==== Sediment cycles ====
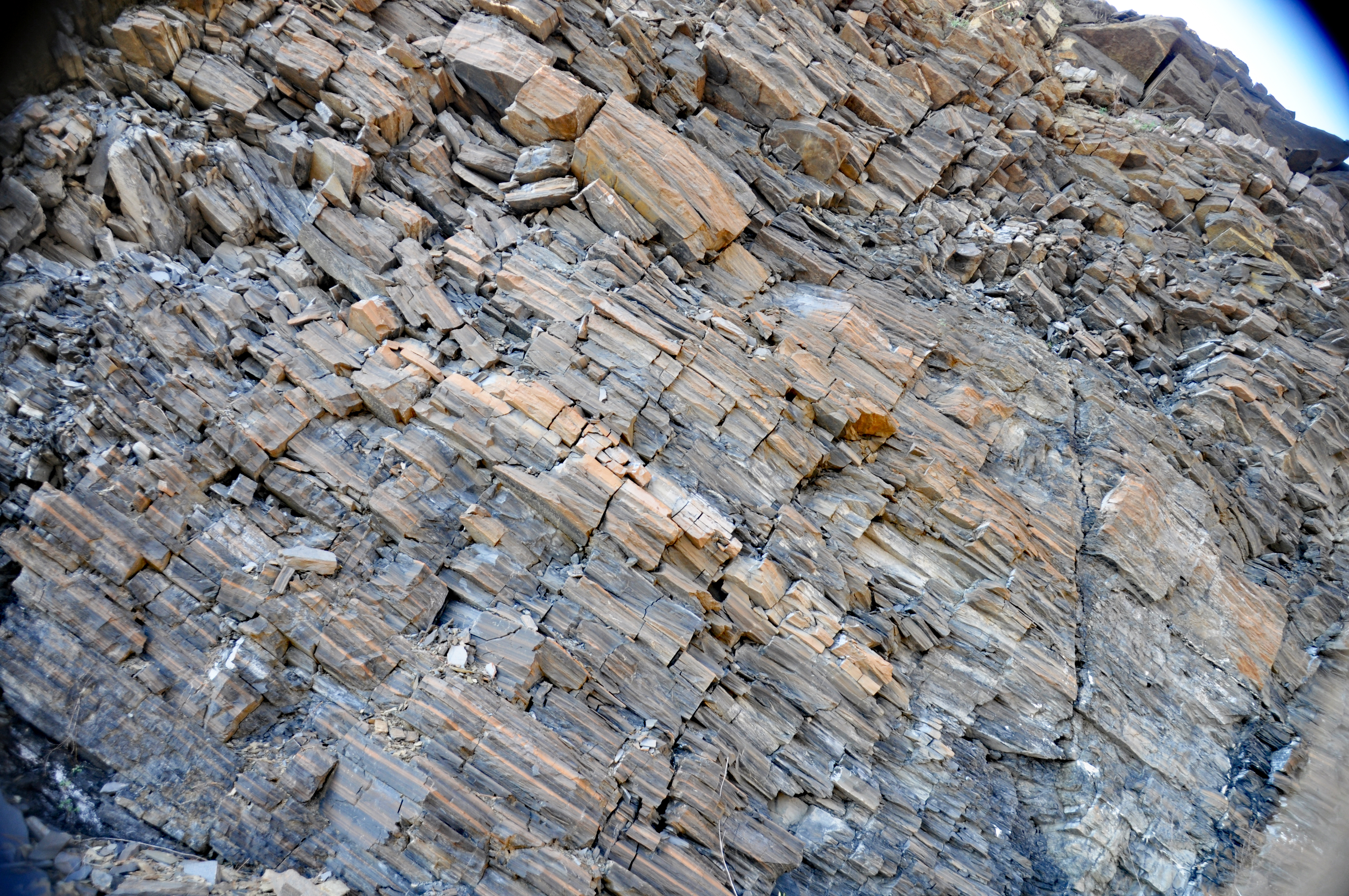
An outcrop showing cyclical beds of fine-grained sediments at the Solite Quarry

Sediment cycles are readily apparent in the formation, shifting between the extremes of black microlaminated shale and massive coarse mudstone. These are identified as Van Houten cycles, a name applied to fluctuating lake depositional conditions throughout the Triassic rift basins of the Newark Supergroup. Each cycle probably corresponds to variations in precipitation tied to the earth's precession, a type of Milankovitch cycle which oscillates on a scale exceeding 21,000 years. 17 or 18 cycles are generally acknowledged in a continuous section at the Solite Quarry. Some sources estimate that up to 30 cycles were preserved at the site, factoring in all three quarry pits combined. The semi-precessional (10,000 to 15,000 year) astronomical cycle is another strong influence on sedimentation.

In the Cow Branch Formation, each cycle begins with a brief package of fine silty claystone. The uppermost portion of this package is rich in mica and carbon, with very little calcareous material. It is followed shortly by a very thin but laterally extensive dolomite bed. These layers correspond to a period of rising lake levels. Fossils of all types are most common in the succeeding black shale and associated lithologies, the point where the lakes are at their deepest extent. Most of the fossiliferous unit is calcareous black shale, though thin beds of extremely fine siliclastic clay can also be found. Insect fossils are predominant in microlaminated carbon-poor shale while fish, plants, and coprolites tend to occur among interbedded carbon-rich dolomite, siltstone, and fine sandstone. The fossiliferous layers occupy only a small portion of each cycle, less than a thousand years' worth of sedimentation. They give way to a thicker and coarser series of shallow-water siltstone, first with a high proportion of pyrite and slickensides, then salt casts, and finally massive siltstone beds scoured by wave action.

== Age ==
The Cow Branch Formation is certainly from the Late Triassic, though there is disagreement as to the exact age of its sediments. The fossil content and depositional environment are very similar to the Lockatong Formation in the Newark Basin of the Mid Atlantic region, and to a lesser extent the Chinle Formation in the southwest United States. During the late 20th century, these formations were often assigned to the later part of the Carnian stage. This was justified by their fossil content, particularly palynomorphs, which were comparable to the Middle Keuper of Germany. The conchostracan Anyuanestheria has been reported from both the German Middle Schilfsandstein and the "lower Cow Branch Formation" (now known as the Walnut Cove Formation).

A Carnian age has been brought into doubt by a more diverse suite of dating methods in the Newark Supergroup. Starting in the 1990s, the depositional history of the Newark Basin was recalibrated through a combination of core drilling, radiometric dating, cyclostratigraphy, and magnetostratigraphy. The result was the Newark astrochronostratigraphic polarity time scale (APTS), a unifying system which provides precise ages for sediment layers within the basin. The resulting ages were younger than previously expected. For example, the Lockatong Formation was assigned a mid-Norian age (222.56 – 218.11 Ma), rather than late Carnian.

The same techniques used to create the Newark APTS can be applied to other basins with continuous cyclical deposition, such as the Dan River-Danville Basin. A magnetostratigraphic sequence has been reconstructed for the Dan River-Danville Basin since 1997, assisting correlation to the Newark Basin. There are at least twelve pairs of normal-reverse magnetic polarity chrons recorded in the Dan River-Danville Basin. Four of these magnetostratigraphic intervals were present through the deposition of the Cow Branch Formation: a long reverse chron (D3r), followed by a short normal chron (D4n), a moderate-length reverse chron (D4r) and finally a long normal chron (D5n). These four chrons have been equated with chrons E11r, E12n, E12r, and E13n (respectively) in the Newark Basin. Chrons E11r to E13n apply to a period of time extending from the early-mid Lockatong Formation (Nursery Member) up to the early Passaic Formation (Warford Member), 221.47 Ma to 216.97 Ma. If the Cow Branch Formation is equivalent to this interval, then it would be firmly positioned within the Norian stage. The fossil beds of the Solite Quarry are in the lower-middle part of the formation, with an estimated age close to 220 Ma.

== Paleobiota ==
Color key: Taxon / Reclassified taxon / Taxon falsely reported as present / Dubious taxon or junior synonym / Ichnotaxon / Ootaxon / Morphotaxon

Notes
Uncertain or tentative taxa are in small text
~~crossed out~~ taxa are discredited.

=== Reptiles ===
Reptiles of the Cow Branch Formation
Genus / Taxon	Species	Material	Notes	Images
Apatopus	A. sp.	Footprints	Presumed phytosaur footprints	
Atreipus	A. milfordensis	Footprints	Footprints of early quadrupedal dinosaurs or dinosauromorphs, possibly ornithischians.	
Grallator	G. sp.	Footprints	Presumed dinosaur footprints	
Gwyneddichnium	G. sp.	Footprints	Footprints, presumably created by small tanystropheids such as Tanytrachelos.	
Mecistotrachelos	M. apeoros	Multiple partial skeletons, two of which have been described	A probable archosauromorph with elongated ribs, presumably hosting gliding membranes.	
Rutiodon	R. carolinensis	A partial skeleton and teeth.	A phytosaurid (or mystriosuchine) phytosaur	
Tanytrachelos	T. ahynis	Numerous specimens, including complete skeletons.	A small tanystropheid archosauromorph closely related to Tanystropheus. Some specimens preserve traces of muscles and ligaments near the tail.	

=== Fish ===
Undescribed pholidophorids and holosteans were present. A relatively large freshwater shark tooth is also known from the formation.

Fish of the Cow Branch Formation
Genus / Taxon	Species	Material	Notes	Images
Diplurus	D. cf. newarki	At least one large specimen	A coelacanth, sometimes placed in the genus Osteopleurus.	
Cionichthys	C. sp.		A redfieldiiform	
cf. Pariostegus	cf. Pariostegus sp.		A coelacanth	
Semionotus	S. brauni.	At least three specimens	A semionotiform ginglymodian	
Synorichthys	S. sp.	"Several partial skeletons"	A redfieldiiform	
Turseodus	T. spp.	At least two specimens	A "palaeoniscid"-grade actinopterygian	

=== Arthropods ===
"Conchostracans" (clam shrimp) from the formation have typically been assigned to the genera Cyzicus and Palaeolimnadia, though they may instead be species of Eustheria. Apart from arthropods, other invertebrate fossils from the Cow Branch Formation include (uncommon) Scoyenia burrows and indeterminate unionid bivalves.

The most abundant insects are aquatic hemipterans (78% of specimens identifiable to order), with beetles in a distant second place (10%). Most hemipteran and beetle fossils have yet to be assigned to the species level. In terms of named diversity, dipterans (flies) make up the bulk of the assemblage, despite representing only 1.5% of insect fossils from the Solite Quarry. Within the shale layers bearing insect fossils, aquatic insects are most abundant in the early part of a layer, while terrestrial insects maintain a low but steady presence through the entire layer.

97 different morphotypes (forms) of beetles occur in the Solite Quarry. In terms of size distribution, the beetle fauna is similar to modern ecosystems, with just over half of all morphotypes between 2 and 4 mm in length. Most morphotypes are rare, with 84% known from a single specimen. The two major exceptions are Leehermania and Holcoptera, both of which are known from numerous specimens (about 77% of all beetle fossils from the site). Few morphotypes are shared between Solite and other Triassic-Jurassic insect faunas. Archostematan beetles are rare at Solite despite making up the vast majority of Triassic-Jurassic beetle diversity, as indicated by other sites.

Arthropods of the Cow Branch Formation
Genus / Taxon	Species	Material	Notes	Images
Alinka	A. cara	Two specimens.	A procramptonomyiid fly.	
Archescytinidae	A. indet.		Indeterminate archescytinid thrips.	
Architipula	A. youngi	"Excellent specimens"	A limoniid crane fly in the subfamily Architipulinae.	
Argyrarachne	A. solitus	A single juvenile specimen missing the abdomen.	An araneomorph spider, one of the oldest known potential species of araneomorph.	
Blattodea	B. indet.		Indeterminate cockroaches.	
Brachyrhyphys	B. distortus	One distorted female specimen.	A protorhyphid fly.	
Cascadelcana	C. virginiana	A wing.	The oldest known member of Elcanidae, a family of cricket-like orthopterans.	
?Crosaphis	C. virginiensis	One specimen.	A crosaphidid fly tentatively assigned to Crosaphis.	
cf. Clytiopsis	cf. C. sp.		A crayfish-like decapod.	
Darwinula	D. spp.		Freshwater ostracods (seed shrimp).	
Diptera	D. indet.		Indeterminate flies, including eoptychopterids and culicomorphs.	
Holcoptera	H. solitensis	Two elytra with preserved color patterns.	A water beetle in the family Coptoclavidae.	
Keimelioptera	K. rara	One specimen.	A stem-paraneopteran in the family Keimeliopteridae.	
Keimelioptera	K. solensis	240 specimens.	A stem-paraneopteran in the family Keimeliopteridae.	
Leehermania	L. prorova	Numerous specimens.	A beetle, originally identified as the oldest known staphylinid (rove beetle), and later classified as a myxophagan.	
Metarchilimonia	M. krzeminksorum	Two specimens, one of which is a female.	A limoniid crane fly in the subfamily Architipulinae.	
Metarchilimonia	M. solita	One specimen.	A limoniid crane fly in the subfamily Architipulinae.	
Mormolucoides	M. articulatus	Numerous specimens preserved together in "death beds".	Insect larvae with thick mandibles, likely the aquatic grubs of beetles such as Holcoptera.	
Naucoridae	N. indet.		Indeterminate naucorids (creeping water bugs).	
Orthoptera	O. indet.		Indeterminate orthopterans (crickets, grasshoppers, and allies)	
Phoroschizidae	P. indet.		Indeterminate stem-group beetles.	
?Phyllocarida	?P. indet.		Possible indeterminate phyllocarid crustaceans. May represent hemipterans or fly pupae instead.	
Phyloblatta	P. grimaldii		One of the youngest known phyloblattid cockroaches.	
Prosechamyia	P. dimedia	One specimen.	A stem-group brachyceran fly.	
Prosechamyia	P. trimedia	One specimen.	A stem-group brachyceran fly.	
Pseudopolycentropodes	P. virginicus	Three specimens.	A scorpionfly in the family Pseudopolycentropodidae. Initially misidentified as a trichopteran (caddisfly).	
Thysanoptera	T. indet.		Indeterminate thrips.	
Tipulomorpha	T. indet.		Indeterminate tipulomorphs (crane flies and allies).	
Triassonepa	T. solensis	87 specimens.	The oldest known belostomatid (predaceous water bug).	
Triassopsychoda	T. olseni	One female specimen.	A probable psychodid (drain fly).	
Triassothrips	T. virginicus	Seven specimens.	One of the oldest known thrips.	
Veriplecia	V. rugosa	One male specimen.	A paraxymyiid fly.	
Virginiptera	V. certa	Two specimens.	A paraxymyiid fly. One specimen was initially misidentified as Crosaphis.	
Virginiptera	V. lativentra	One male specimen.	A paraxymyiid fly.	
Virginiptera	V. similis	Two male specimens.	A paraxymyiid fly.	
Yalea	Y. argentata	One male specimen.	A procramptonomyiid fly.	
Yalea	Y. rectimedia	One female specimen.	A procramptonomyiid fly.	

=== Plants ===
Plant fossils are abundant. The most common examples are conifer foliage, followed by bennettitales and ginkgophytes. Ferns and sphenophytes are also present, though less common. Two endemic forms, the seed taxon Edenia villisperma and the leaf taxon Pannaulika triassica, have been compared to angiosperms (flowering plants) in their structure, though they likely are unrelated to true angiosperms.

Plants of the Cow Branch Formation
Genus / Taxon	Species	Notes	Images
Brachyphyllum	B. sp.	Abundant conifer leaf-bearing shoots.	
cf. Compsostrobus	cf. C. neotericus	A conifer seed cone.	
Cyathoforma	C. sp.	Fronds of a large cyatheacean tree fern.	
cf. Dechellyia	cf. D. sp.	Leaves of an enigmatic gymnosperm, often considered a gnetalean.	
Dictyophyllum	D. sp.	Fronds of a dipterid fern.	
Edenia	E. villisperma	A hairy parachuting seed superficially similar to the achenes of modern Platanus (plane trees and American sycamores).	
cf. Elatocladus	cf. E. sp.	Conifer leaf-bearing shoots.	
Eretmophyllum		Common ginkgophyte leaves.	
Fraxinopteris	F. sp.	Winged gymnosperm seeds.	
Glandulozamites	G. sp.	Cycad leaves.	
cf. Grammaephloios	cf. G. sp.	A lycopod.	
Lepacyclotes	L. sp.	A lycopod.	
"Lepidodendron type"		A lycopod, briefly listed in a single paper on the formation.	
Lonchopteris	L. virginiensis	Fern fronds. The species has sometimes been considered referable to another fern genus, Cynepteris.	
Metreophyllum	M. sp.	Leaves of a ginkgophyte similar to Eretmophyllum.	
Neocalamites	N. cf. knowltonii	Fragmentary leaf and stem impressions of a sphenophyte (horsetail).	
Pagiophyllum	P. diffusum	Conifer leaf-bearing shoots.	
Pagiophyllum	P. simpsoniae	Conifer leaf-bearing shoots.	
Pagiophyllum	P. sp.	Abundant conifer leaf-bearing shoots.	
Pannaulika	P. triassica	Leaves of an enigmatic plant originally described as similar to dicot angiosperms, though more likely a species of fern.	
Pelourdea	P. sp.	Leaves of an enigmatic gymnosperm, possibly a type of conifer.	
Podozamites	P. sp.	Conifer leaves.	
Pseudohirmerella	P. delawarensis	Seed cones of an early cheirolepid conifer. Fossils of this species from the Solite Quarry were previously known by the names Glyptolepis platysperma or Hirmeriella sp.	
Pterophyllum	P. cf. Ctenophyllum giganteum.	Common bennettitale leaves.	
cf. Sagenopteris	cf. S. sp.	Leaves of a caytonialean "seed fern".	
Sphenobaiera	S. sp.	Uncommon ginkgophyte leaves.	
Sphenozamites	S. sp.	Bennettitale leaves	
Todites	T. gaillardotii?	Fronds of an osmundaceous fern. Fossils of this species were initially described as Neuropteris gaillardotii and N. linnaeaefolia. The latter species has been reported from the Solite Quarry under the name Acrostichites linnaefolius. The two species have subsequently been synonymized and referred to the genus Todites.	
Wingatea	W. sp.	Fronds of a gleicheniaceous fern.	
cf. Zamiostrobus	cf. Z. lissocardus	A cycad seed cone.	
Zamites	Z. powellii	Common bennettitale leaves.	

== Gallery ==
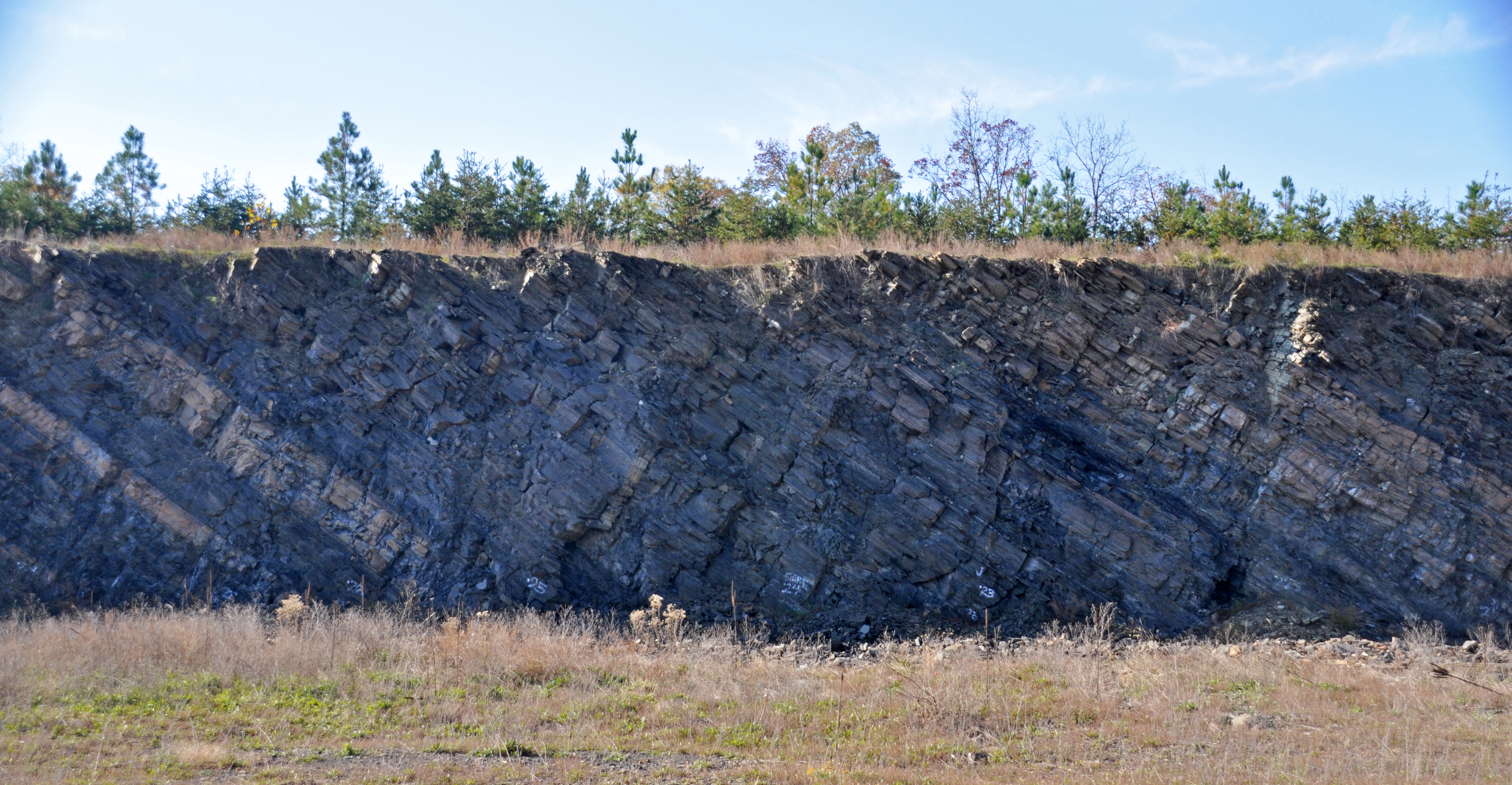
Southwest wall of Solite Quarry Pit B

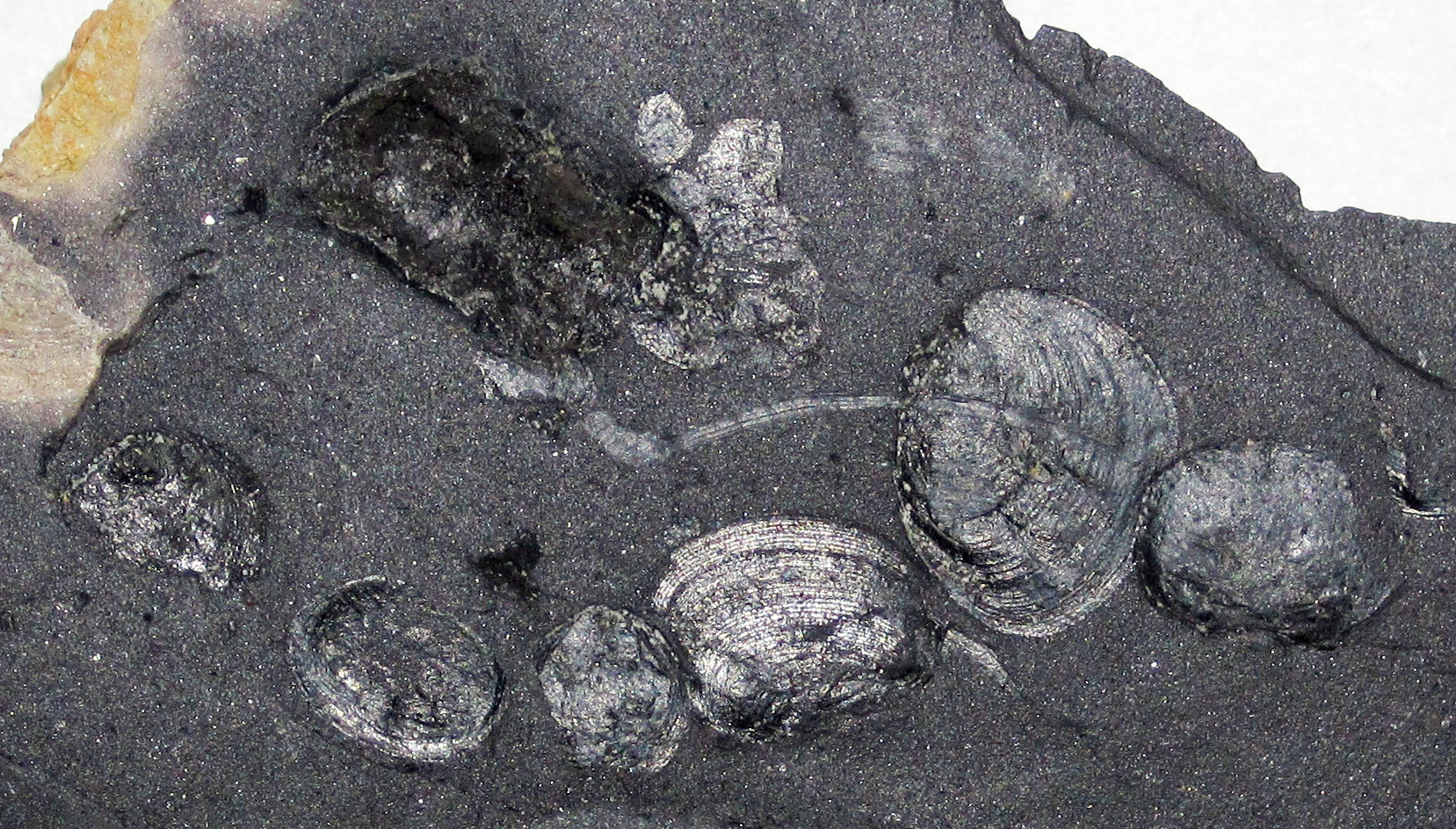
Conchostracan fossils in black shales (Solite Quarry Pit B)

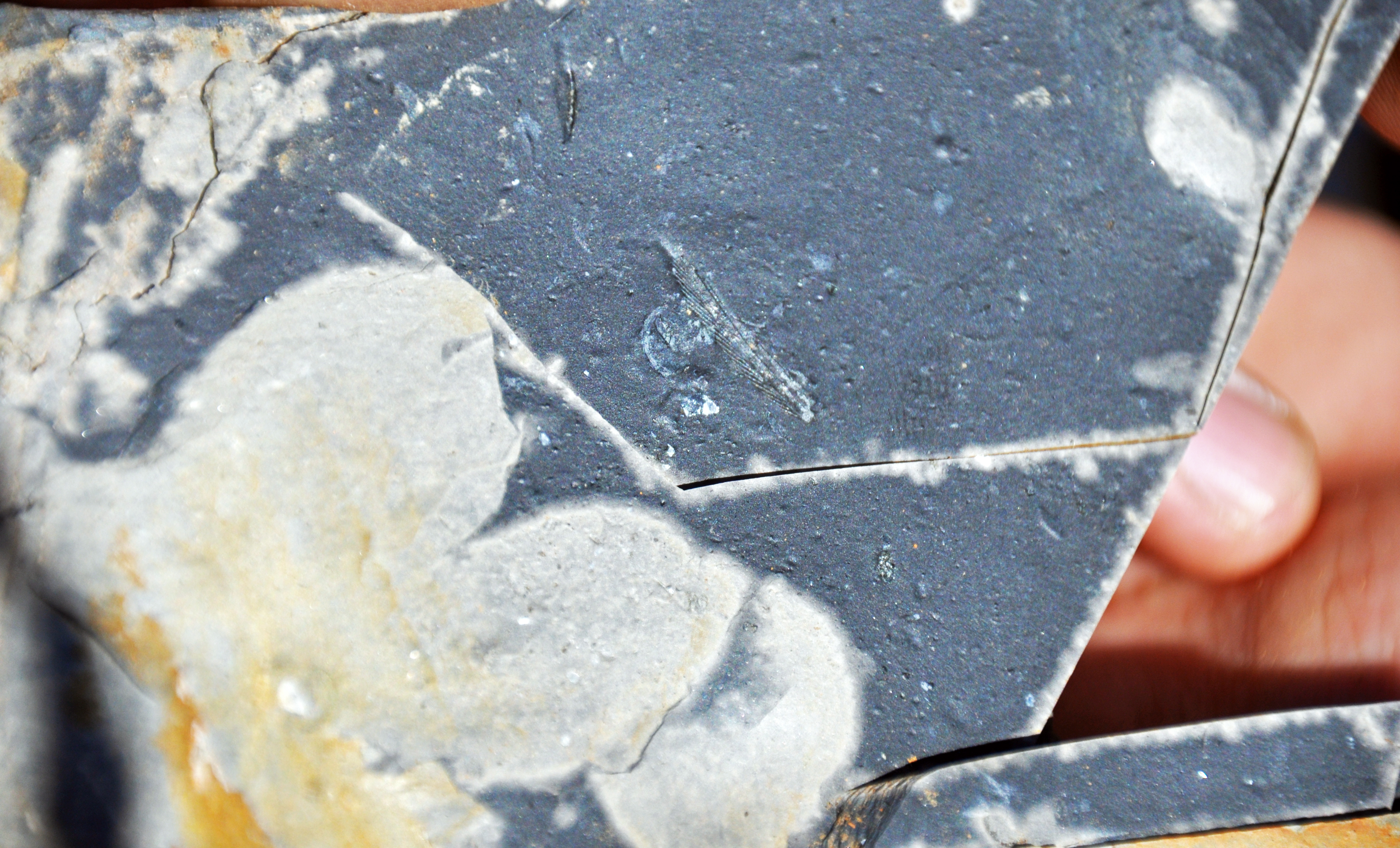
Fossil fish spine in black shale from an outcrop near Madison, North Carolina

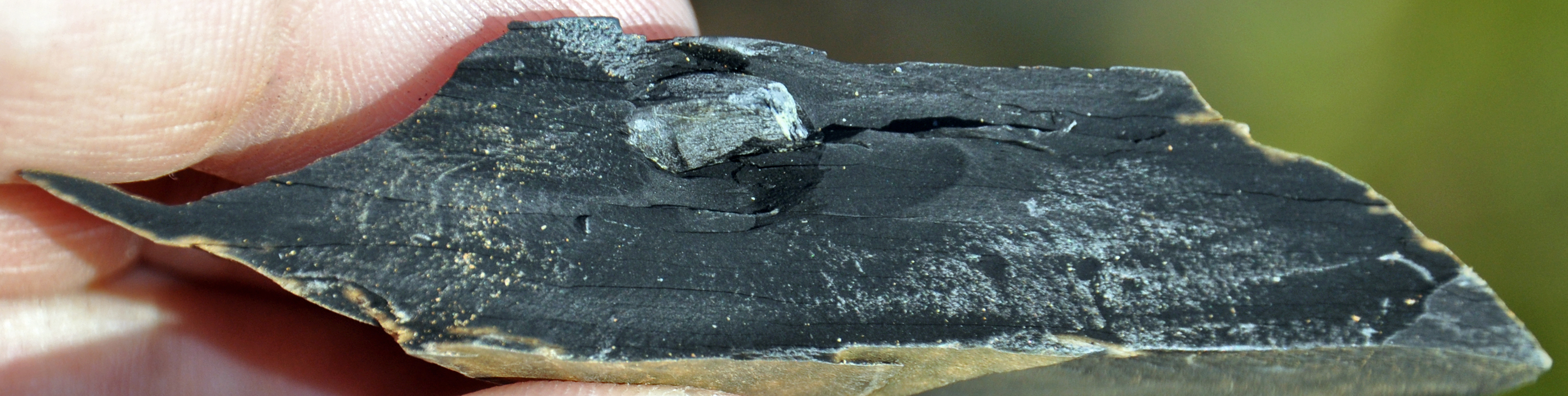
Vertebrate tooth in black shale from an outcrop near Madison, North Carolina

== See also ==
- List of dinosaur-bearing rock formations
  - List of stratigraphic units with ornithischian tracks
    - Indeterminate ornithischian tracks
