= Walloon Coal Measures =

Geologic subgroup in Australia

- Stratigraphic range: Middle–Late Jurassic (Callovian-Kimmeridgian) 165.3–149.78 Ma
- Type: Subgroup
- Unit of: Injune Creek Group
- Sub-units: Juandah Coal Measures, Maclean Sandstone Member, Tangalooma Sandstone, Taroom Coal Measures, Mutdapilly fossil locality
- Underlies: Springbok Sandstone
- Overlies: Eurombah Formation
- Thickness: 50–240 m (160–790 ft)

Lithology
- Primary: Shale, sandstone, siltstone
- Other: Coal, limestone

Location
- Coordinates: 27.0°S 152.6°E
- Approximate paleocoordinates: 67.2°S 93.3°E
- Region: Queensland
- Country: Australia
- Extent: Surat & Clarence-Moreton Basins

Type section
- Named for: Walloon
- Named by: Dudgeon
- Year defined: 1982
- Walloon Coal Measures (Australia) Walloon Coal Measures (Queensland)

The Walloon Coal Measures are a Late Jurassic geologic subgroup in Queensland, Australia. Deposited within the Surat Basin, it is considered to be Callovian to Kimmeridgian in age based on lead-uranium dating of tuffites within the unit.

== Age ==
The Walloon Coal Measures was originally dated to the Early Jurassic between 1959 and 1963, based on miospore biocorrelation. In 1964 it was determined to be of Middle Jurassic age. Additional miospore studies in 1974 and 1982 concluded an early Bajocian age. However, in 2018 it was determined via highly precise U–Pb dating to be of Middle to Late Jurassic age, specifically Callovian–Kimmeridgian, between 165.3 and 149.78 million years ago.

== History ==
The Walloon Coal Measures were initially dubbed as the 'Walloon Beds' by Walter Cameron in 1907, then a poorly understood unit known from the Rosewood-Walloon area. In 1955, Frederick Whitehouse officially gave it its current name, the Walloon Coal Measures, and John Cameron in 1970 assigned its type section, located near Rosewood. Additional examined deposits include clay strata within the uppermost part of the Walloon Coal Measures.

== Distribution & thickness ==
The Walloon Coal Measures have been recorded throughout the eastern escarpment of the range, and in the Heifer and Sandy Creeks. Along the road towards to the Black Duck Creek diatomite mine at the head of Rocky Scrub Creek is a continuous exposure, but only the lowermost 50 metres (160 ft). In the Haldon area, the exposed coal measures reach up to 120 metres (390 ft) in thickness. Still, this is merely half the sequence's thickness in the type area. Between the late Mesozoic to early Cenozoic eras, there was erosion in the top half of the coal measures west of the type area before the eruption of the basalts. This is likely to be the reason for the anomaly, particularly as the coal measures are very thoroughly eroded within the uppermost 60 metres (200 ft).

== Lithology & deposition environment ==
Vertical lithological changes allowed for a broad tripartite subdivision of the coal measures, as well as the discernment of shifts in the depositional environment. In order from lowest to highest, these comprise of:

- Unit 1: Unit 1 consists of clay-ironstone and fine-grained sandstone. 200 cm (79 in) thick horizontal thin bedding is predominant. Thickness is around 20 metres (66 ft). This unit was deposited in fluvio-lacustrine conditions, and a palynomorph assemblage reveals that a bountiful fern-conifer-cycad vegetation existed.
- Unit 2: Unit 2 is composed of medium to coarse grained, thickly bedded sandstone with extensive-cross stratification. It is between 40–60 metres (130–200 ft) in thickness. It features coarse-grained and cross-bedded sediments which came from a fluvial environment.
- Unit 3: Unit 3 hosts bleached and kaolinitic clay-ironstone, clay, fine-grained sandstone and minor coal deposits. Thickness is up to 60 metres (200 ft). In this unit, the deposition features a return to a lower energy environment, which is the cause for the fine-grained sandstone sedimentation, as well as the reoccurrence of palynomorphs similar to those of Unit 1.

The sandstones are either quartzarenities or sublitharenites, depending on the classification used. They are primarily composed of quartz grains, with smaller amounts of biotite, chert, and the feldspars orthoclase, plagioclase and sanidine. The majority of beds are composed of calcium carbonate, and often resistant in some areas. Calcite nodules of irregular composition have been weathered to the soil surface.

The calcium carbonate was formed via diagenesis. It has been concluded in 1976 by Kenneth Martin that free calcium ions originated from the decomposition of feldspars and micas or by infiltration with ground-waters. However, since the CaCO_{3} is not omnipresent as it is absent in the Heifer Creek Sandstone, ground-water infiltration has been ruled out. It is more likely to have been the first theory; the decomposition of micas. Although the feldspars present in thinner sections have gone through little decomposition, the micas have transformed into clays. This is likely where the calcium ions were released, which then reacted with already-present carbonate ions, forming calcite.

== Paleobiota ==
The Walloon Coal Measures has provided fossil flora and trace fossils of theropods, ornithopods and Changpeipus bartholomaii and Garbina roeorum. The dinosaur Rhoetosaurus, described from body fossils, comes from the coal measures. 11 types of tracks are known from the formation, mostly those of large (prints 30–75 cm (12–30 in) theropods.

=== Dinosaurs ===
==== Sauropods ====
Sauropods of the Walloon Coal Measures
Genus	Species	Clade	Image
Rhoetosaurus	R. brownei	Sauropoda, Gravisauria	Rhoetosaurus size comparison.

=== Plants ===
Plant fossils are known from the Mutdapilly fossil locality.

Plants of the Walloon Coal Measures
Genus	Species	Clade	Image
Cladophlebis	C. australis	Osmundales, Osmundaceae	Fossil of C. australis (Ashfield Shale).
Cladophlebis	C. sp. A	Osmundales, Osmundaceae	Fossil of C. australis (Ashfield Shale).
Elatocladus	cf. E. confertus	Pinophyta, incertae sedis	Fossil of the related Elatocladus zignoi.
Equisetum	E. bryanii	Equisetales, Equisetaceae	Foliage of the modern E. arvense.
Hausmannia	H. sp. cf. H. deferrariisii	Filicales, Dipteridaceae	
Palissya	P. ovalis	Palissyales, Palissyaceae	
Sphenopteris	S. sp.	Lyginopteridales, Lyginopteridaceae	Fossil of the related S. hoeninghausii.
Taeniopteris	T. sp. cf. T. spatulata	Tracheophytes, incertae sedis	
