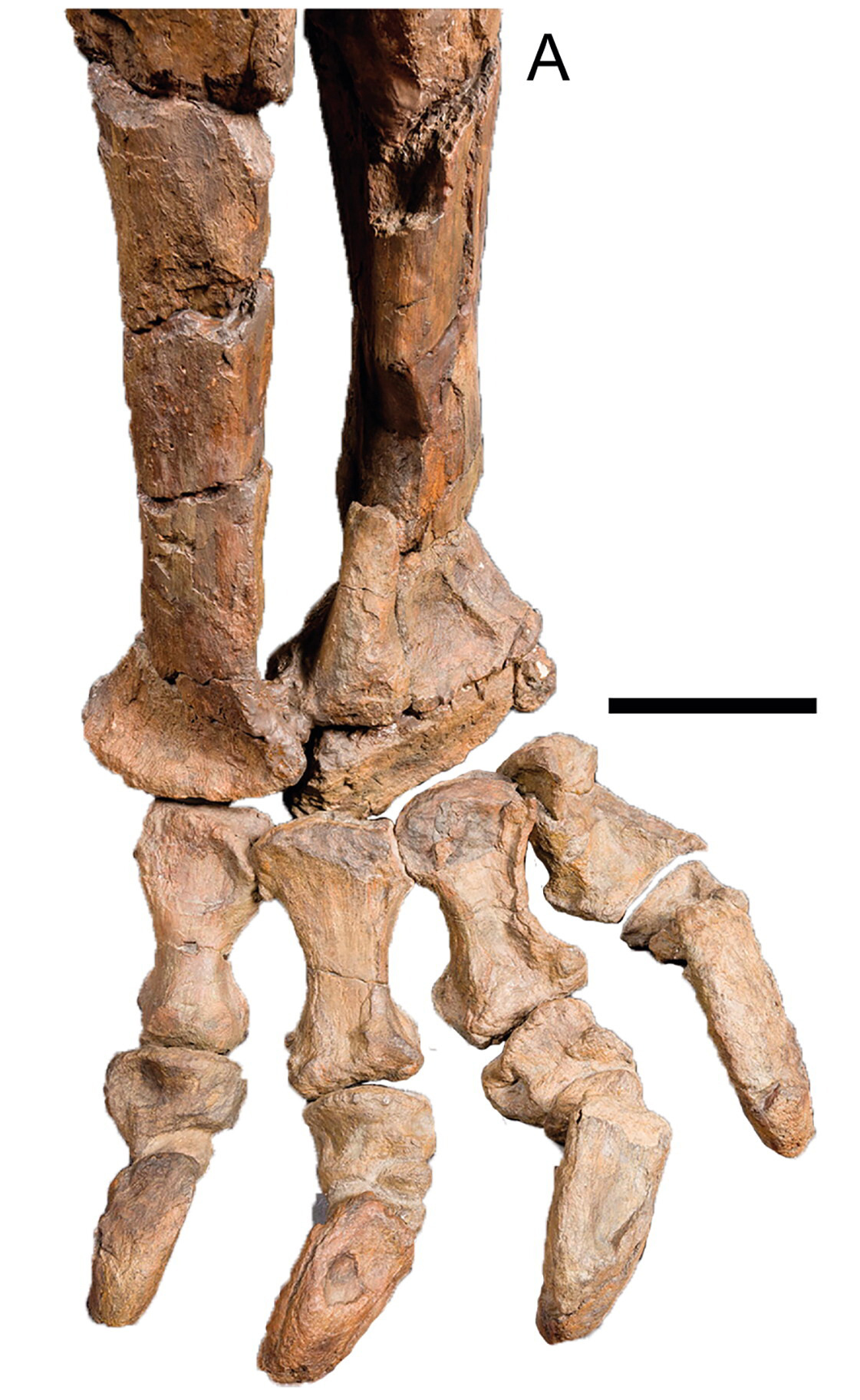
- Leg bones

Scientific classification
- Kingdom: Animalia
- Phylum: Chordata
- Class: Reptilia
- Clade: Dinosauria
- Clade: Saurischia
- Clade: †Sauropodomorpha
- Clade: †Sauropoda
- Clade: †Gravisauria
- Genus: †Rhoetosaurus; Longman, 1926

Type species
- †Rhoetosaurus brownei Longman, 1926

= Rhoetosaurus =

Rhoetosaurus Temporal range: Oxfordian ~162.6 Ma

Extinct genus of dinosaurs

Rhoetosaurus (meaning "Rhoetus lizard", after a titan in Greek mythology) is a genus of sauropod dinosaur from the Late Jurassic (Oxfordian) Walloon Coal Measures of what is now eastern Australia. Rhoetosaurus is estimated to have been about 15 metres (49 ft) long, weighing about 9 tonnes (8.9 long tons; 9.9 short tons). Subsequent authors have sometimes misspelled the name: Rhaetosaurus (de Lapparent & Laverat, 1955); Rheteosaurus (Yadagiri, Prasad & Satsangi, 1979).

== Discovery and species ==
Size comparison

In 1924, Heber Longman, self-trained paleontologist at (and later director of) the Queensland Museum in Brisbane, learned of a large fossil reptile skeleton exposed in the Walloon Coal Measures at Durham Downs near Roma in southern inland Queensland. The station manager, Arthur Browne, forwarded fragments of bone to Longman, and was honoured with the dinosaur's specific name brownei. The initial collection was of 22 tail vertebrae, including a series of 16 consecutive bones, and other fragmentary hindlimb pieces. Soon after Longman announced the new discovery, he visited the station and arranged for more material of the same skeleton to be sent to the Queensland Museum. These included additional vertebrae from the thoracic area, bits of rib, more caudals and more of the femur and pelvis as well as a cervical vertebra. Further material was collected by Mary Wade and Alan Bartholomai in 1975, and still more by Drs. Tom Rich, Anne Warren, Zhao Xijin, and Ralph Molnar. By 2012, prepared material comprised 40 vertebrae, five partial thoracic ribs, part of the sacrum, fragments of the ilia, an ischium, the left and right pubic bones, and much of the right hind limb (femur, tibia, fibula, astragalus, and pes). More bones are yet to be removed from rock.

Rhoetosaurus is among the best-known sauropods thus far discovered in Australia, as well as for the Jurassic of Gondwana.

== Relationships ==
Initially Longman, with advice from leading German paleontologist Friedrich von Huene, noted the primitive nature of Rhoetosaurus, and so for a long time, it was called a cetiosaurid. More recently, others have compared it to Shunosaurus, based on similar general age and several traits of its hind limbs. In a 2012 phylogenetic study, Rhoetosaurus was found to be a basal sauropod just outside of Eusauropoda, but the authors noted that support for its position was weak, and that its placement as a eusauropodan could not be rejected, but that it definitely was not a member of Neosauropoda.
