= Boserup =

Boserup is a Danish surname. Notable people with the surname include:

- Anders Boserup (1940–1990), Danish researcher
- Bodil Boserup (1921–1995), Danish politician
- Ester Boserup (1910–1999), Danish economist
- Julia Boserup (born 1991), American tennis player
