= Pannaulika =

Pannaulika Temporal range: Carnian

Scientific classification
- Kingdom: Plantae
- Clade: Embryophytes
- Clade: Tracheophytes
- Division: Polypodiophyta
- Class: Polypodiopsida (?)
- Genus: †Pannaulika; B. Cornet (1993)
- Species: †P. triassica

Binomial name
- †Pannaulika triassica B. Cornet (1993)

Extinct genus of plants

Pannaulika triassica is a prehistoric plant species described in 1993 on the basis of a small, incomplete leaf and two "flowers". It has been considered either to be a very early flowering plant or, more recently, an aberrant fern.

It was found in Carnian rock in the Solite Quarry, on the border of North Carolina and Virginia. The incomplete, dicot-like leaf fragment, measuring 32 mm in length, has a vein structure which suggested to the original describer, Bruce Cornet, that the plant was an angiosperm, although it also shared some characteristics with ferns. Possibly, this means that primitive angiosperms from the Jurassic period evolved in tropic highlands. Plants in this type of environment rarely fossilize, but their seeds can be carried beyond the species' natural range of distribution. This theory suggests that angiosperms only managed to spread in subtropical lowlands, where they have been found in Early Cretaceous rock. In 1996, it was noted that although assignment to the angiosperms could be doubted, the looping vein pattern was angiosperm-like and different from that of Dictyophyllum, a fern in the family Dipteridaceae, which has a somewhat similar venation.

In 2001, the discovery of a relatively complete specimen of Pannaulika triassica from the same quarry was reported at a Geological Society of America conference. The authors of the conference report said that the new specimen indicates a relationship with Clathropteris, which is a fern in the family Dipteridaceae, suggesting that P. triassica is not an angiosperm. The 2014 field guide to the quarry states that Pannaulika is "best considered as a rather aberrant fragment of foliage from a dipteridaceous fern".
