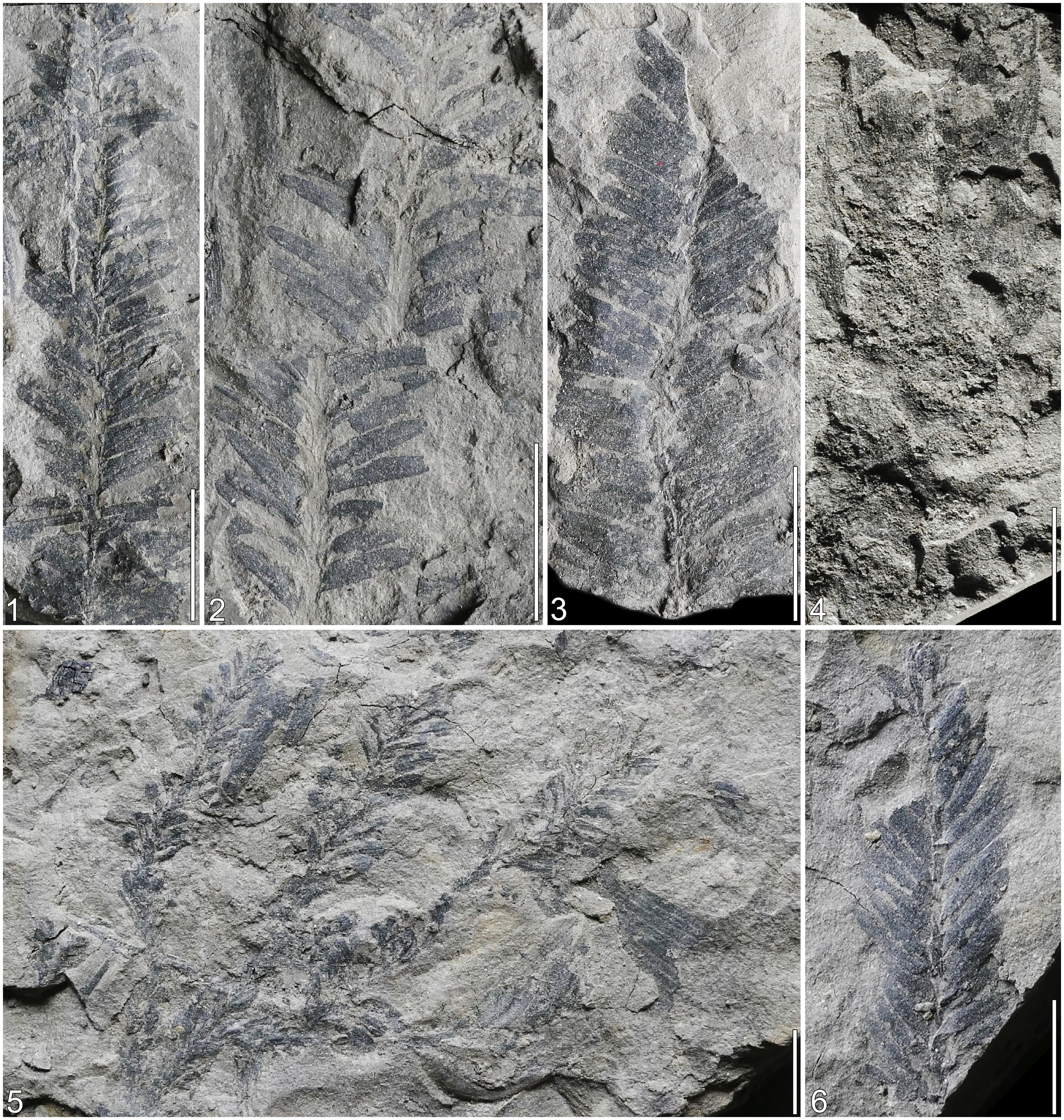
- Foliage of Stachyotaxus from the Late Triassic of Germany.

Scientific classification
- Kingdom: Plantae
- Clade: Tracheophytes
- Clade: Gymnosperms
- Division: Pinophyta
- Class: Pinopsida
- Order: †Palissyales; Doweld 2001

Families and genera
- See text

= Palissyales =

Palissyales Temporal range: Rhaetian–Aptian

Extinct order of conifers

Palissyales are an extinct order of conifers, known from the Mesozoic. They are best known from the genus Palissya, which is found in Laurasia and Eastern Gondwana dating from the Late Triassic to Early Cretaceous. The only other confirmed genus of the family, Stachyotaxus known from the Late Triassic of the Northern Hemisphere. The genus Knezourocarpon from the Jurassic of Australia has also been tentatively considered a member of the order. The cone of the best known genus Palissya is noted for its unusual construction, which is borne on a large bract (modified leaf), and consists of two parallel rows of ovules that run along the midline of the adaxial surface of the bract which are encased in cup-like structures formed by scales. The bracts are helically arranged around an axis, forming a compound catkin-like structure. The seeds are thin walled were likely only viable for a short period of time and were likely adapted to wind dispersal. Palissya has been considered in some respects to be similar to some Paleozoic Voltziales, as well as Taxaceae and Podocarpaceae.

== Taxonomy ==
- Family: Palissyaceae Florin 1958
  - Palissya Endlicher 1847 Late Triassic - Early Cretaceous (Rhaetian-Aptian)
    - P. hunanensis Wang 2012 China (Hunan) Late Triassic (Rhaetian)
    - P. sphenolepis (Braun 1843) Nathorst 1908 emend. Florin 1958 Germany (Franconia) Sweden (Stabbarp), Poland, Canada, Late Triassic-Early Jurassic (Rhaetian-Hettangian)
    - P. harrisii C.R. Hill ex Pattemore & Rozefelds England (Yorkshire) Middle Jurassic (Aalenian)
    - P. bartrumii Edwards 1934 New Zealand Middle Jurassic (Callovian) ?Late Jurassic (?Tithonian)
    - P. elegans Parris et al. 1995 Australia (Victoria) Early Cretaceous (Valanginian)
    - P. tillackiorum Pattemore & Rozefelds, 2019 Australia (Queensland) Early Cretaceous (Valanginian)
    - Palissya sp. (Koonwarra Fossil Bed) Australia (Victoria) Early Cretaceous (Aptian)
    - P. antarctica Cantrill 2000 Antarctica (Antarctic Peninsula) Early Cretaceous (Aptian)
  - Stachyotaxus Nathorst, 1886 Late Triassic (Rhaetian) Sweden, Greenland, Germany
  - Desmiophyllum? Lesquereux 1878 Late Triassic-Early Cretaceous UK, Germany, Romania, Spain, Italy, Portugal, China, Ukraine, Russia, Mongolia, Argentina(?)
  - Ourostrobus? Harris 1935 Late Triassic (Rhaetian), Greenland, Germany
  - Sphaerostrobus? Harris 1935 Late Triassic (Rhaetian), Greenland, Germany
- Family ?Knezourocarponaceae Pattemore, Rigby & Playford 2014
  - ?Knezourocarpon Pattemore 2000
    - Knezourocarpon narangbaensis Pattemore 2000 Queensland, Australia Early Jurassic (Pliensbachian-Toarcian),
    - Knezourocarpon ovalis (Parris et al. 1995) Walloon Coal Measures, Australia, Middle Jurassic (Bathonian)
