= Cyclostratigraphy =

Study of astronomically forced climate cycles within sedimentary successions

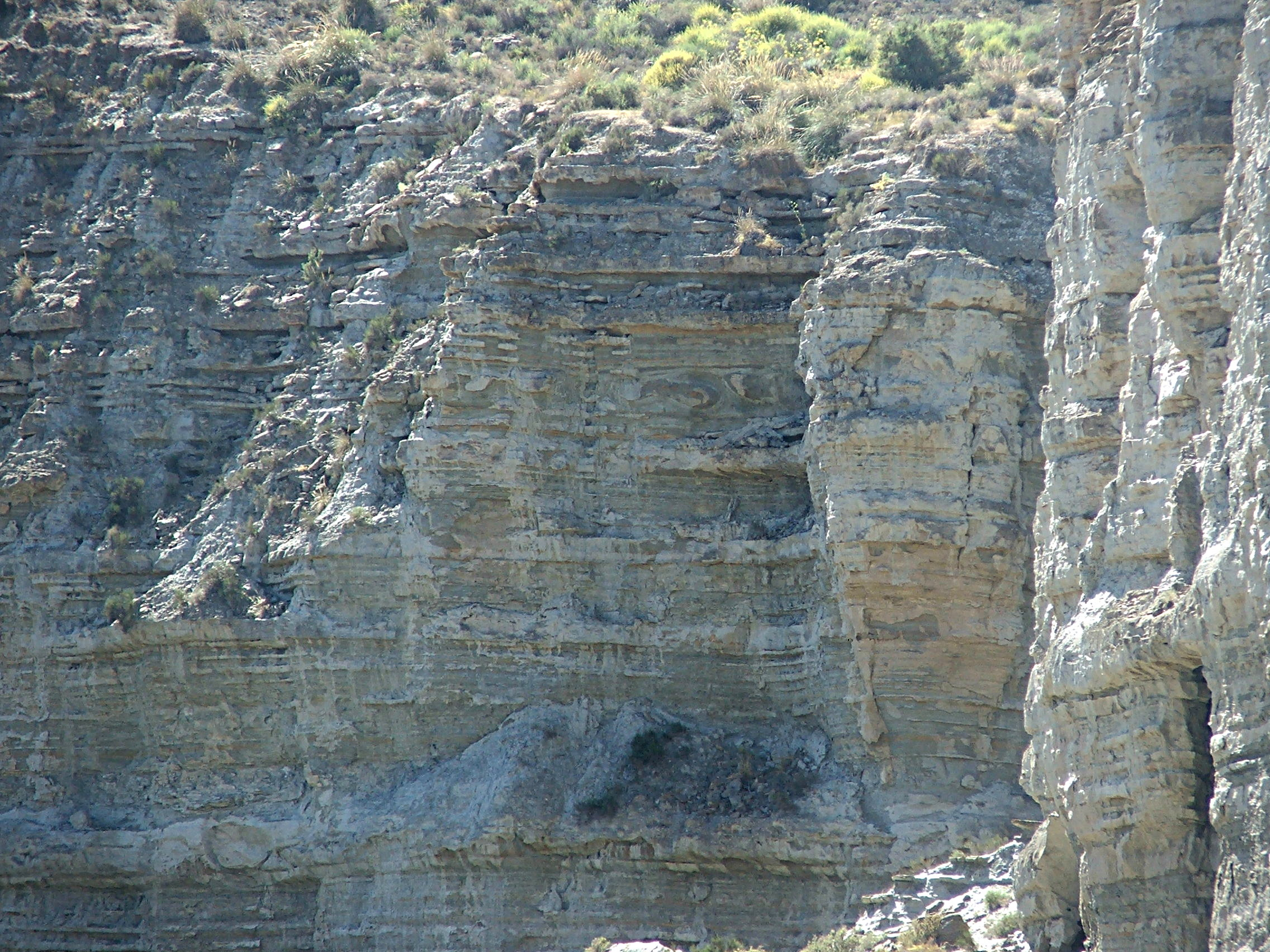
The nature of sediments can vary in a cyclic fashion, and these cycles can be displayed in the sedimentary record - here visible in the colouration and resistance of strata

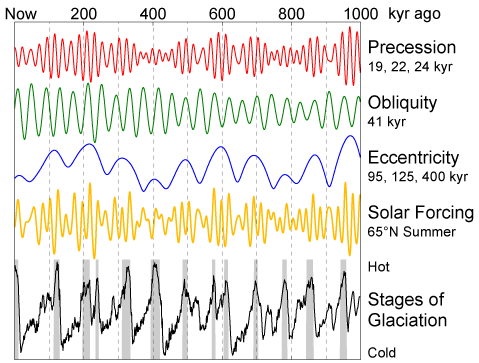
Milankovitch variations, solar forcing, and glacial cycles. Image by Robert A. Rohde, under the CC BY-SA 3.0 license.

Cyclostratigraphy is a subdiscipline of stratigraphy that studies astronomically forced climate cycles within sedimentary successions.

== Orbital changes ==
Astronomical cycles (also known as Milankovitch cycles) are variations of the Earth's orbit around the Sun due to the gravitational interaction with other masses within the Solar System. Due to this cyclicity, solar irradiation differs through time on different hemispheres and seasonality is affected. These insolation variations have influence on Earth's climate and on the deposition of sedimentary rocks.

The main orbital cycles are precession with main periods of 19 and 23 kyr, obliquity with main periods of 41 kyr, and 1.2 Myr, and eccentricity with main periods of around 100 kyr, 405 kyr, and 2.4 Myr. Precession influences how much insolation each hemisphere receives. Obliquity controls the intensity of the seasons. Eccentricity influences how much insolation the Earth receives altogether. Varied insolation directly influences Earth's climate, and changes in precipitation and weathering are revealed in the sedimentary record. The 405 kyr eccentricity cycle helps correct chronologies in rocks or sediment cores when variable sedimentation makes them difficult to assign. Indicators of these cycles in sediments include rock magnetism, geochemistry, biological composition, and physical features like color and facies changes.

== Dating methods and applications ==
To determine the time range of a cyclostratigraphic study, rocks are dated using radiometric dating and other stratigraphic methods. Once the time range is calibrated, the rocks are examined for Milankovitch signals. From there, ages can be assigned to the sediment layers based on the astronomical signals they contain.

Cyclostratigraphic studies of rock records can lead to accurate dating of events in the geological past, to increase understanding of cause and consequences of Earth's (climate) history, and to better understand controls on depositional mechanisms of sediments and the behaviour of sedimentary systems. Cyclostratigraphy also aids the study of planetary physics, because it provides information on astronomical cycles that extends beyond 50 Ma (astronomical models are not accurate beyond this). Assigning time ranges to these astronomical cycles can be used to calibrate ^{40}Ar/^{39}Ar dating.

== Limitations ==
Uncertainties also arise when using cyclostratigraphy. Using radioisotope dating to set parameters for time scales introduces a degree of uncertainty. There are also stratigraphic uncertainties, uncertainties due to climate forcing, and uncertainty about Earth's rotational effects on its precession. There is also uncertainty in records extending beyond 50 Ma because astronomical models are not accurate beyond 50 Ma due to chaos and uncertainties of initial conditions.

== See also ==
- Cyclic sediments
- Milankovitch cycles
- Stratigraphy
