= Anders Boserup =

Danish researcher (1940–1990)

Anders Boserup (January 15, 1940 – May 4, 1990) was a Danish researcher. He graduated from the University of Copenhagen in 1965 with a Magister in physics and became a lecturer in sociology in 1972. He was the co-founder of the Danish Institute for Peace and Conflict Research and the Nordic Peace Foundation. He researched peace, security and disarmament. He is well known for his work with non-offensive defence. He worked as a consultant for the UN, SIPRI and the Danish Foreign Ministry in relation to disarmament.
