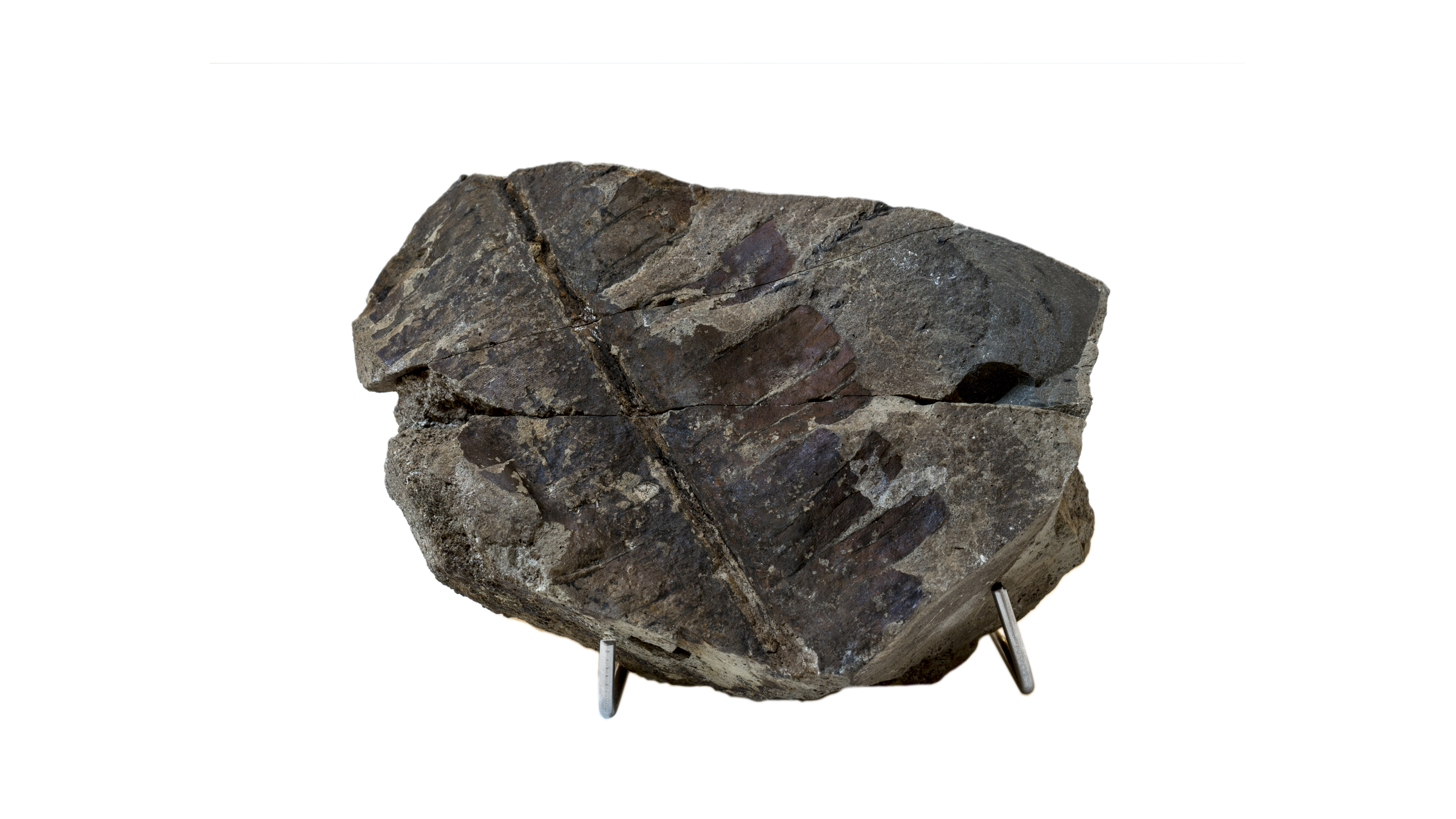
- Fossil
- Life restoration

Scientific classification
- Kingdom: Plantae
- Clade: Tracheophytes
- Clade: Gymnosperms
- Division: Cycadophyta
- Class: Cycadopsida
- Order: Cycadales
- Genus: †Bjuvia; Florin (1933)

Species
- †Bjuvia simplex; †Bjuvia thalensis; †Bjuvia dolomitica

= Bjuvia =

Bjuvia Temporal range: Late Permian - Jurassic

Extinct genus of cycads

Bjuvia is a genus of extinct cycads from the Late Permian to the Jurassic. Its members had simple leaves that were capable of reaching lengths of 1 m and a width of over 30 cm while the entire plant could exceed 8 m in height. During the Triassic, cycads such as Bjuvia spread to inhabit wetlands previously occupied by plants like Lepidodendron and Sigillaria.
