= Palissya =

Palissya Temporal range: Rhaetian–Aptian

Scientific classification
- Kingdom: Plantae
- Clade: Tracheophytes
- Clade: Gymnospermae
- Division: Pinophyta
- Class: Pinopsida
- Order: †Palissyales
- Family: †Palissyaceae
- Genus: †Palissya; Endlicher, 1847

Species
- See text

Extinct genus of conifer

Palissya is an extinct form genus of female (ovule-bearing) conifer cones, known from the Late Triassic (Rhaetian) to the Early Cretaceous (Aptian). The cone of Palissya is noted for its unusual catkin-like construction: Slender bracts (modified leaves) are rigidly attached in a helical pattern around a tall woody core. The adaxial (upper) surface of each bract bears two parallel rows of ovules which are encased in cup-like structures formed by scales. The seeds are thin-walled and were likely only viable for a short period of time, meaning that they were probably adapted to wind dispersal.

Palissya has been considered in some aspects to be similar to some Paleozoic Voltziales, as well as Taxaceae and Podocarpaceae. Most leaves assigned to the genus do not belong to the same plant as the conifer cone. Palissya specimens from the Middle Jurassic of Yorkshire are associated with Elatocladus-like leaves. Several Australasian species with fragile cones were referred to the separate genus Knezourocarpon, though some were later moved back into Palissya. Other related cone genera include Stachyotaxus, Metridiostrobus, and Compsostrobus, all from the Late Triassic of the Northern Hemisphere.

True specimens of Palissya first appeared in the Northern Hemisphere during the latest Triassic (Rhaetian) and spread to Eastern Gondwana (modern Australia, New Zealand, and Antarctica) during the Middle Jurassic. The youngest known records of Palissya in the Northern Hemisphere are from the Middle Jurassic, but Palissya persisted in Eastern Gondwana into the Early Cretaceous, with the youngest records being from the Aptian.

== Species ==
After

Species	Authority	Country	Age
P. hunanensis	Wang 2012	China (Hunan)	Late Triassic (Rhaetian)
P. sphenolepis	(Braun 1843) Nathorst 1908 emend. Florin 1958	Germany (Franconia) Sweden (Stabbarp) Poland Canada	Late Triassic-Early Jurassic (Rhaetian-Hettangian)
P. harrisii	C.R. Hill ex Pattemore & Rozefelds	England (Yorkshire)	Middle Jurassic (Aalenian)
P. bartrumii	Edwards 1934	New Zealand	Middle Jurassic (Callovian) ?Late Jurassic (?Tithonian)
P. elegans	Parris et al. 1995	Australia (Victoria)	Early Cretaceous (Valanginian)
P. tillackiorum	Pattemore & Rozefelds, 2019	Australia (Queensland)	Early Cretaceous (Valanginian)
Palissya sp. (Koonwarra)	N/A	Australia (Victoria)	Early Cretaceous (Aptian)
P. antarctica	Cantrill 2000	Antarctica (Antarctic Peninsula)	Early Cretaceous (Aptian)
