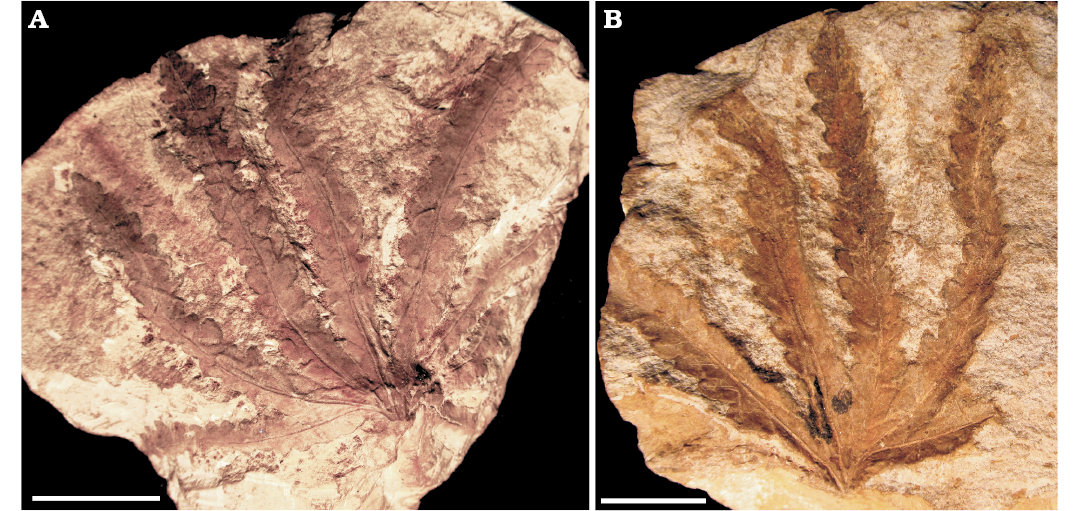
- Leaves of Dictyophyllum castellanosi from the Middle Triassic of Argentina
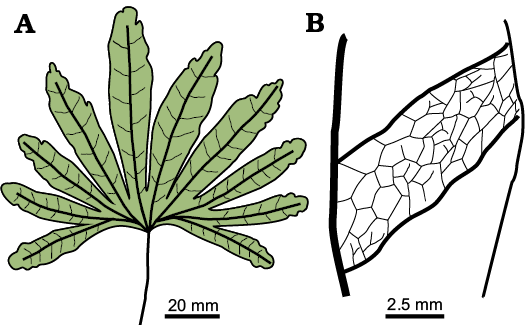
- Reconstruction of Dictyophyllum menendezi from the Middle Triassic of Argentina, along with sketch of pinnae venation

Scientific classification
- Kingdom: Plantae
- Clade: Embryophytes
- Clade: Tracheophytes
- Division: Polypodiophyta
- Class: Polypodiopsida
- Order: Gleicheniales
- Family: Dipteridaceae
- Genus: †Dictyophyllum; Lindley and Hutton, 1834

Species
- See text

= Dictyophyllum =

Dictyophyllum Temporal range: Middle Triassic–Middle Jurassic

Extinct genus of ferns

Dictyophyllum is an extinct genus of ferns belonging to the family Dipteridaceae. It is known from the Triassic and Jurassic periods. Like most other members of the family, it consists of multiple segments of pinnate leaflets connected to an arm, of which there were two per plant. The monophyly of the genus has been questioned, with a 2018 study suggested that the genus was polyphyletic as currently used.

== Species ==
Table copied from:

Species	Location and age	length of basal lamina uniting adjacent pinnae (cm)	Pinnae			Pinna margin	Angle of 2° vein	Shape of lobe/ pinnula	Shapeof 1° order areoles	Shape of 2° order areoles	Shape of sori
Species	Location and age	length of basal lamina uniting adjacent pinnae (cm)	length (cm)	number on each arm	Shape	Pinna margin	Angle of 2° vein	Shape of lobe/ pinnula	Shapeof 1° order areoles	Shape of 2° order areoles	Shape of sori
Dictyophyllum atuelense	Argentina and Antarctica, Lower Jurassic	unknown	10	unknown	unknown	pinnatipartite	75–90°	straight to falcate	pentagonal to heptagonal elongated	pentagonal to heptagonal isodiametric	unknown
Dictyophyllum bremerense	Australia and South Africa, Upper Triassic	up to 3.5	>14	7	unknown	pinnatifid	55–70°	triangular	rectangular to polygonal elongated	rectangular to polygonal	rounded or elongated
Dictyophyllum castellanosii	Argentina, Middle Triassic	1	4.5–6	4–5	linear-lanceolate	lobate-serrate	45–52°	ovate-acuminate	polygonal elongated	polygonal isodiametric	unknown
Dictyophyllum davidi	Australia, Middle Triassic	1–3	6–20	5–8	lanceolate	dentate to pinnatifid	45–65°	triangular	square, rhomboidal to heptagonal, elongated to isodiametric	indistinct	rounded or elongated
Dictyophyllum ellenbergii	South Africa, Upper Triassic	up to 3.5	up to 20	5	unknown	lobate	65°	triangular to ovate	polygonal irregular	polygonal irregular	circular or elongated
Dictyophyllum exile	Laurasia, Upper Triassic to Lower Jurassic	0.2–1	>17.5	>17	linear to linear-oblanceolate	lobate to pinnatifid	60–90°	triangular	polygonal	polygonal	unknown
Dictyophyllum exquisitum	China, Upper Triassic	0.5–1	5.5–7	6–7	linear- lanceolate	lobate	50°	triangular to falcate, apiculate	polygonal	polygonal	unknown
Dictyophyllum fuenzalidai	Chile, Upper Triassic	unknown	35–40	unknown	unknown	dentate	80–90°	triangular-falcate	pentagonal- heptagonal isodiametric	polygonal	unknown
Dictyophyllum menendezii sp. nov.	Argentina, Middle Triassic	up to 3	up to 8	5–6	oblanceolate	entire to undulate	70–75°	–	rectangular, pentagonal, hexagonal, irregular, elongated	pentagonal, rhomboidal, irregular	unknown
Dictyophyllum nathorstii	Asia, Upper Triassic	4–8	30–40	20–25	linear to lanceolate	lobate	60°	triangular to falcate, apiculate or obtuse	polygonal	polygonal	circular or variable
Dictyophyllum nilssonii	Greenland, Alaska, Sweden, Great Britain, China, Upper Triassic–Lower Jurassic	2–5	>13	6–9	linear	lobate to pinnatipartite	60–90°	falcate	polygonal irregular	polygonal irregular	unknown
Dictyophyllum rugosum	Great Britain, Middle Jurassic	1–2	>50	4–5	lanceolate	lobate to pinnatipartite or pinnatifid	80°	triangular to linear-falcate	polygonal irregular	polygonal irregular	rounded
Dictyophyllum serratum	China, Upper Triassic	1–2	12–15	5–13	linear to lanceolate	lobate	60–70°	falcate	polygonal	polygonal	unknown
Dictyophyllum tenuifolium	Argentina, Chile, Antarctica, Middle to Late Triassic, and Lower Jurassic	1.5	6–15	5–7	oblanceolate	dentate-lobate to pinnatifid	60–90°	triangular	pentagonal to heptagonal elongated	rhomboidal and pentagonal isodiametric	circular
