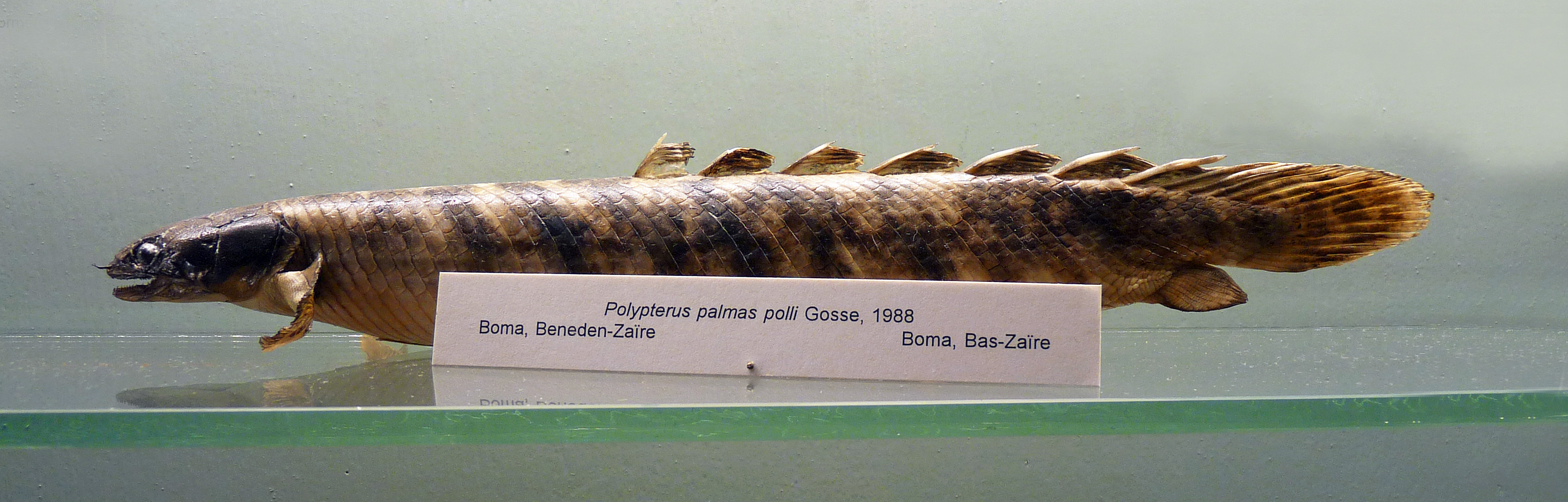

Conservation status
- Least Concern (IUCN 3.1)

Scientific classification
- Domain: Eukaryota
- Kingdom: Animalia
- Phylum: Chordata
- Class: Actinopterygii
- Order: Polypteriformes
- Family: Polypteridae
- Genus: Polypterus
- Species: P. polli

Binomial name
- Polypterus polli J. P. Gosse, 1988
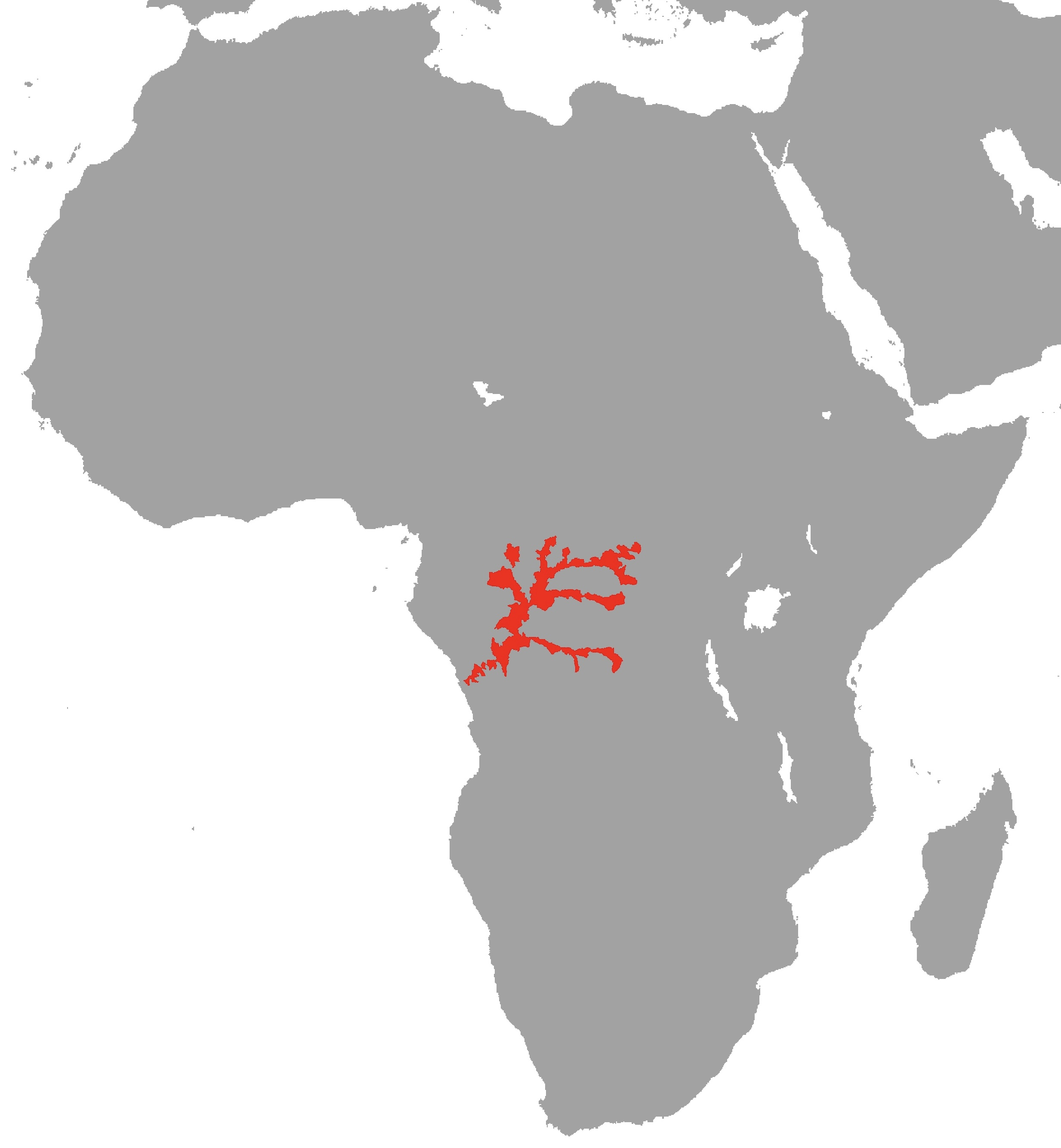

= Polypterus polli =

Species of fish

Polypterus polli, Poll's bichir, is a species of bichir from the Malebo Pool and the lower and central basins of the Congo River. It was named in honor of Belgian ichthyologist Max Poll.

== Description ==
P. polli is an “upper-jaw” bichir, meaning its maxilla protrudes further out than its mandible. It has a maximum recorded length of 12.6 inches (32.1 cm). It can be distinguished from other bichirs by its dull gold body color, greenish-yellow fins, and reticulated body pattern with light-colored “polka-dots” toward the base of the tail. It is oftentimes mistaken for P. palmas in the aquarium trade because they were once considered conspecific and have a similar color pattern, but P. polli lacks the dark transverse barring and speckled look characteristic of both P. palmas morphs. It can also be distinguished by its count of 5-7 dorsal finlets.

Bichirs are stabilomorphic fishes that diverged from other ray-finned fishes possibly as early as the Devonian period. As such, P. palmas can be considered a living fossil, and exhibits many "primitive" traits when compared to other extant fishes. This species has true lungs in addition to gills, and uses a blowhole-like organ called a spiracle to take breaths of atmospheric oxygen (a trait it shares with stem-tetrapods). This allows P. palmas to survive poorly oxygenated water conditions—such as in dried-out seasonal pools—or even entirely on land indefinitely provided that their spiracles and gills remain damp. Juvenile bichirs have underdeveloped lungs, so they exhibit external gills—much like a larval salamander or lungfish—with a branching, featherlike architecture to maximize surface area for oxygen exchange until their lungs mature.

Like most bichirs, P. polli's vision is somewhat lackluster, so it instead hunts using its lateral line and sense of smell. One of its notable stabilomorphic traits is its accessory olfactory organ—an internal structure that has become vestigial or nonexistent in most extant fishes. Due to its retention of this organ and elongate, nostril-like structures called nares, P. polli has a very precise sense of smell.

== Taxonomy ==
P. polli was once considered one of three subspecies of P. palmas. The other two subspecies, P. palmas palmas and P. palmas buettikoferi, are no longer considered valid subspecies and are now simply considered morphs of the monosubspecific P. palmas, while P. polli was elevated to species status in 1988.

Despite historically being taxonomically associated with P. palmas, recent molecular studies have placed P. polli as a sister taxon to P. delhezi.

== In the Aquarium ==
P. polli is occasionally seen in the aquarium trade. Wholesalers and local fish stores often mistake this species for other bichirs such as P. palmas and P. retropinnis, so one must be careful and well-versed in bichir identification to ensure the correct fish is purchased. Captive breeding has not been observed in this species, so P. palmas in the aquarium trade are wild-caught. Because it reaches lengths of over a foot, a tank of at least 75 gallons is required for keeping this species in captivity. They prefer soft, slightly acidic water, but are very hardy fishes tolerant of a wide range of water chemistries in the aquarium. As nocturnal fish that hail from densely vegetated waters, they appreciate a lot of shade and places to hide. They can be sustained on a diet of frozen or live foods, such as bloodworms or earthworms.

Its captive behavior is typical of smaller bichirs. It is not particularly aggressive and territorial disputes only tend to happen with other bichirs, and they tend to be over very quickly once a bichir pecking order has been established. However, as an opportunistic predator, P. palmas is liable to eat small tankmates. The ideal tankmates for P. palmas are large, tall-bodied fishes that tend to stay higher in the water column so as not to compete for territory (such as large cichlids), or other similarly-sized bichirs (such as P. senegalus, P. retropinnis, P. palmas, and P. mokelembembe).
