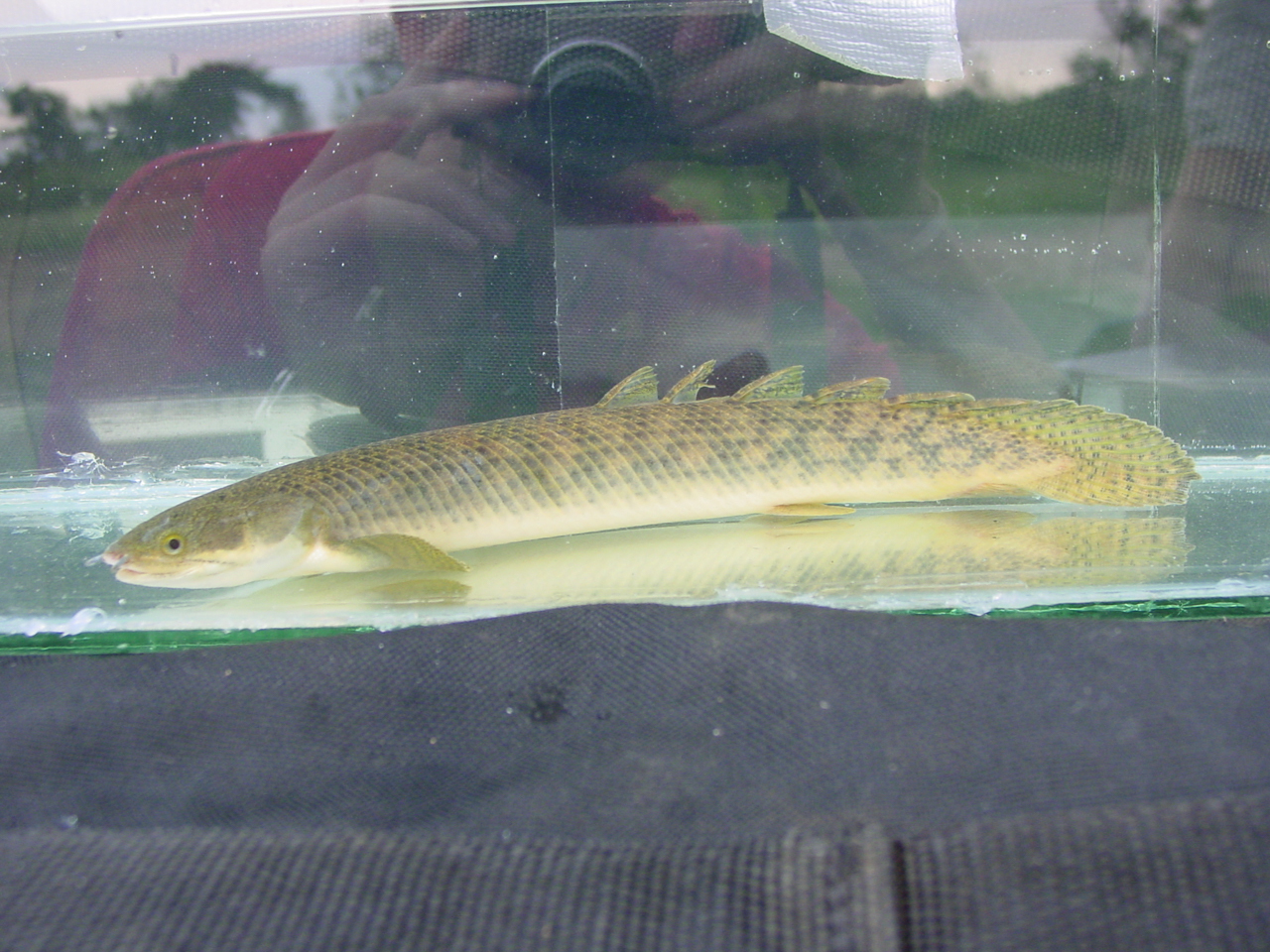
- Polypterus polli

Conservation status
- Least Concern (IUCN 3.1)

Scientific classification
- Kingdom: Animalia
- Phylum: Chordata
- Class: Actinopterygii
- Order: Polypteriformes
- Family: Polypteridae
- Genus: Polypterus
- Species: P. palmas

Binomial name
- Polypterus palmas Ayres, 1850

Subspecies
- P. p. buettikoferi (Steindachner 1891); P. p. palmas Ayres 1850
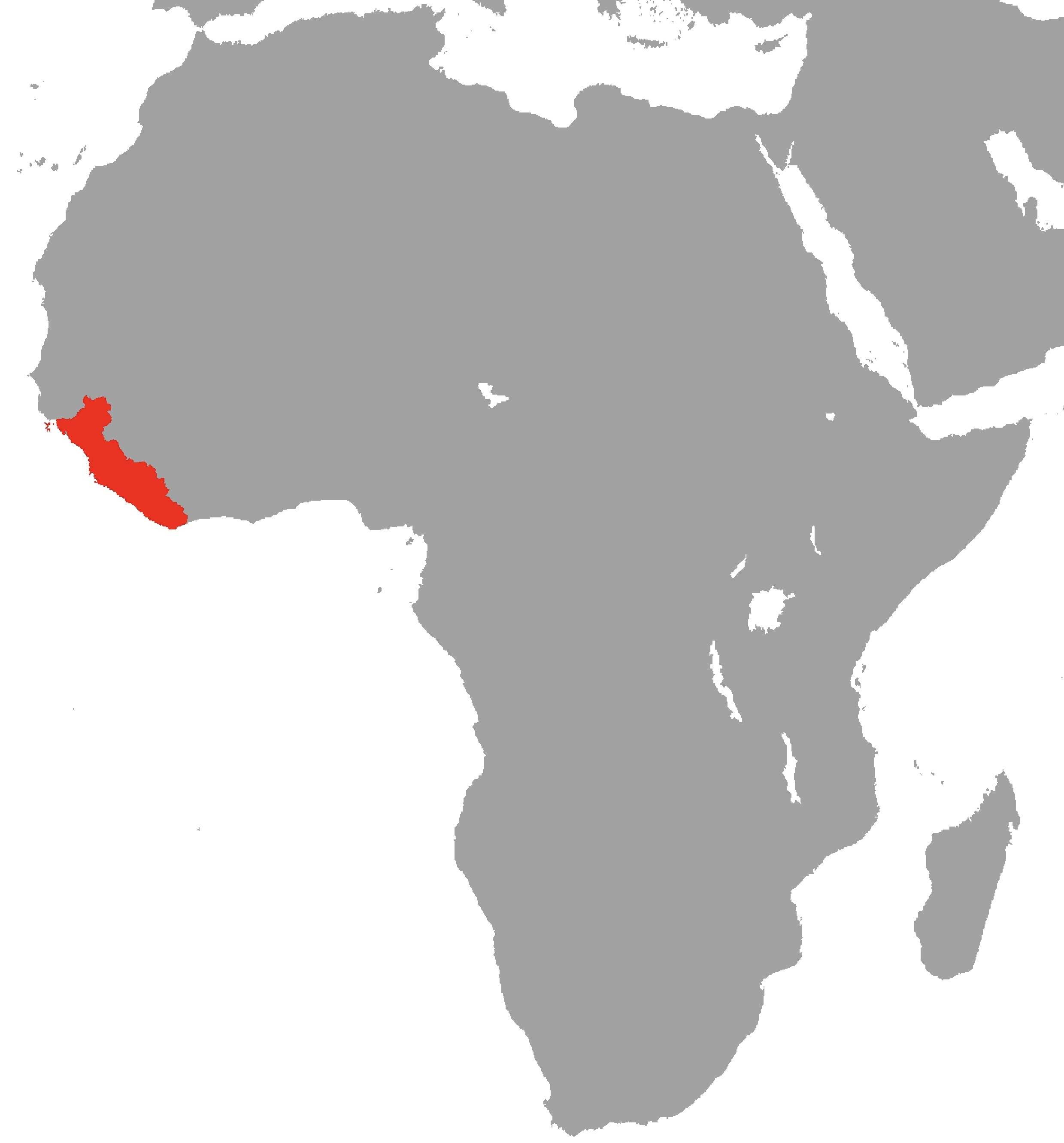

Synonyms
- Polypterus lowei Boulenger 1911; Polypterus buettikoferi Steindachner 1891; Polypterus retropinnis lowei (Boulenger 1911)

= Polypterus palmas =

Species of fish

Polypterus palmas, also called the shortfin or marbled bichir, is a fish in the family Polypteridae found in freshwater environments throughout West Africa.

== Distribution ==
P. palmas has a wide range; it can be found in freshwater environments at a demersal depth range in Ghana, Democratic Republic of Congo, Cameroon, Liberia, Guinea, Ivory Coast, and Sierra Leone. It was listed as "least concern" within this range by the IUCN in 2021.

== Description ==
The maximum recorded length of P. palmas is 35.3 cm (13.9) inches, although lengths of around 30 cm (11.8 inches) are much more common. It can be distinguished from other similarly-sized bichirs such as Polypterus senegalus and Polypterus polli by its bright gold coloration, speckled pattern, and dark transverse barring.

Two color morphs of this species exist—P. palmas "palmas" is found in more Southern locales and has a more pale yellow body with thinner dark barring, while P. palmas "buettikoferi" is from more Northern locales, and exhibits a deep gold with thicker dark barring. These two morphs were once considered to be subspecies of P. palmas, but their taxonomic validity has since been revoked. Polypterus polli was also once considered a subspecies of P. palmas, but was later elevated to species status.

Bichirs are stabilomorphic fishes that diverged from other ray-finned fishes possibly as early as the Devonian period. As such, P. palmas can be considered a living fossil, and exhibits many "primitive" traits when compared to other extant fishes. This species has true lungs in addition to gills, and uses a blowhole-like organ called a spiracle to take breaths of atmospheric oxygen (a trait it shares with stem-tetrapods). This allows P. palmas to survive poorly oxygenated water conditions—such as in dried-out seasonal pools—or even entirely on land indefinitely provided that their spiracles and gills remain damp. Juvenile bichirs have underdeveloped lungs, so they exhibit external gills—much like a larval salamander or lungfish—with a branching, featherlike architecture to maximize surface area for oxygen exchange until their lungs mature.

Like most bichirs, P. palmas's vision is somewhat lackluster, so it instead hunts using its lateral line and sense of smell. One of its notable stabilomorphic traits is its accessory olfactory organ—an internal structure that has become vestigial or nonexistent in most extant fishes. Due to its retention of this organ and elongate, nostril-like structures called nares, P. palmas has a very precise sense of smell.

== In the Aquarium ==
P. palmas is quite popular in the aquarium trade. Captive breeding has not been observed in this species, so P. palmas in the aquarium trade are wild-caught. Because it reaches lengths of over a foot, a tank of at least 75 gallons is required for keeping this species in captivity. They prefer soft, slightly acidic water, but are very hardy fishes tolerant of a wide range of water chemistries in the aquarium. As nocturnal fish that hail from densely vegetated waters, they appreciate a lot of shade and places to hide. They can be sustained on a diet of frozen or live foods, such as bloodworms or earthworms.

Its captive behavior is typical of smaller bichirs. It is not particularly aggressive and territorial disputes only tend to happen with other bichirs, and they tend to be over very quickly once a bichir pecking order has been established. However, as an opportunistic predator, P. palmas is liable to eat small tankmates. The ideal tankmates for P. palmas are large, tall-bodied fishes that tend to stay higher in the water column so as not to compete for territory (such as large cichlids), or other similarly-sized bichirs (such as Polypterus senegalus, Polypterus retropinnis, Polypterus polli, and Polypterus mokelembembe).
