= The Bichir Handbook =

Book about living fossils

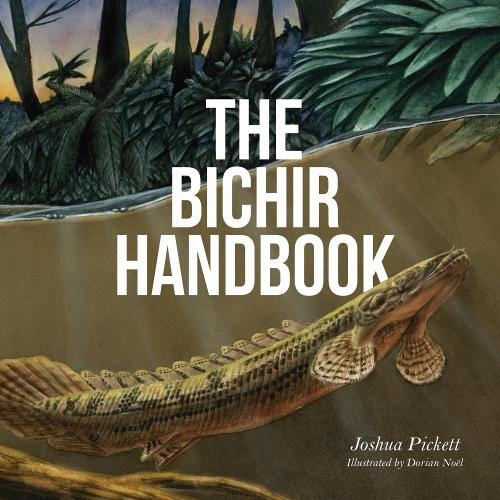
- Author: Joshua Pickett
- Language: English
- Genres: Biodiversity & Conservation, Fishes (ichthyology), Fishkeeping
- Published: November 2020
- Publication place: United Kingdom
- Pages: 138
- ISBN: 9781789727708 9781838167684 (2nd edition)
- Website: www.thebichirhandbook.co.uk

The Bichir Handbook is a book written by conservationist and graphic designer Joshua Pickett from Salisbury, England, about living fossil fishes known as Polypteriformes (bichirs), found throughout west and central Africa, and formerly South America. In the book, Pickett describes all extant Polypteridae, and details extinct species with illustrated reconstructions. The book was designed by the author and illustrated by paleoartist Dorian Noël.

The author includes commentaries from Polypterus researcher, Emily M. Standen, and former editor of the Journal of Fish Biology, Olaf L. F. Weyl.

A second edition with a higher pagination was published in December 2025, containing new content and revised science.

== Reception ==
The Bichir Handbook was commended in the 'Top 20 Best Ever Fish Books' by Practical Fishkeeping magazine, March 2021, and was well received by readers, winning various awards. The book has been as described as being "more than an 'ordinary' book" by DATZ Magazine, and Head of the Science Department at Deutsches Meeresmuseum, Timo Moritz claimed "there is no other publication summarizing so much helpful data on keeping polypterids".

Cybium is quoted as saying "[The Bichir Handbook] must be read by all aquarists, and ichthyologists working on current and fossil Polypteridae".

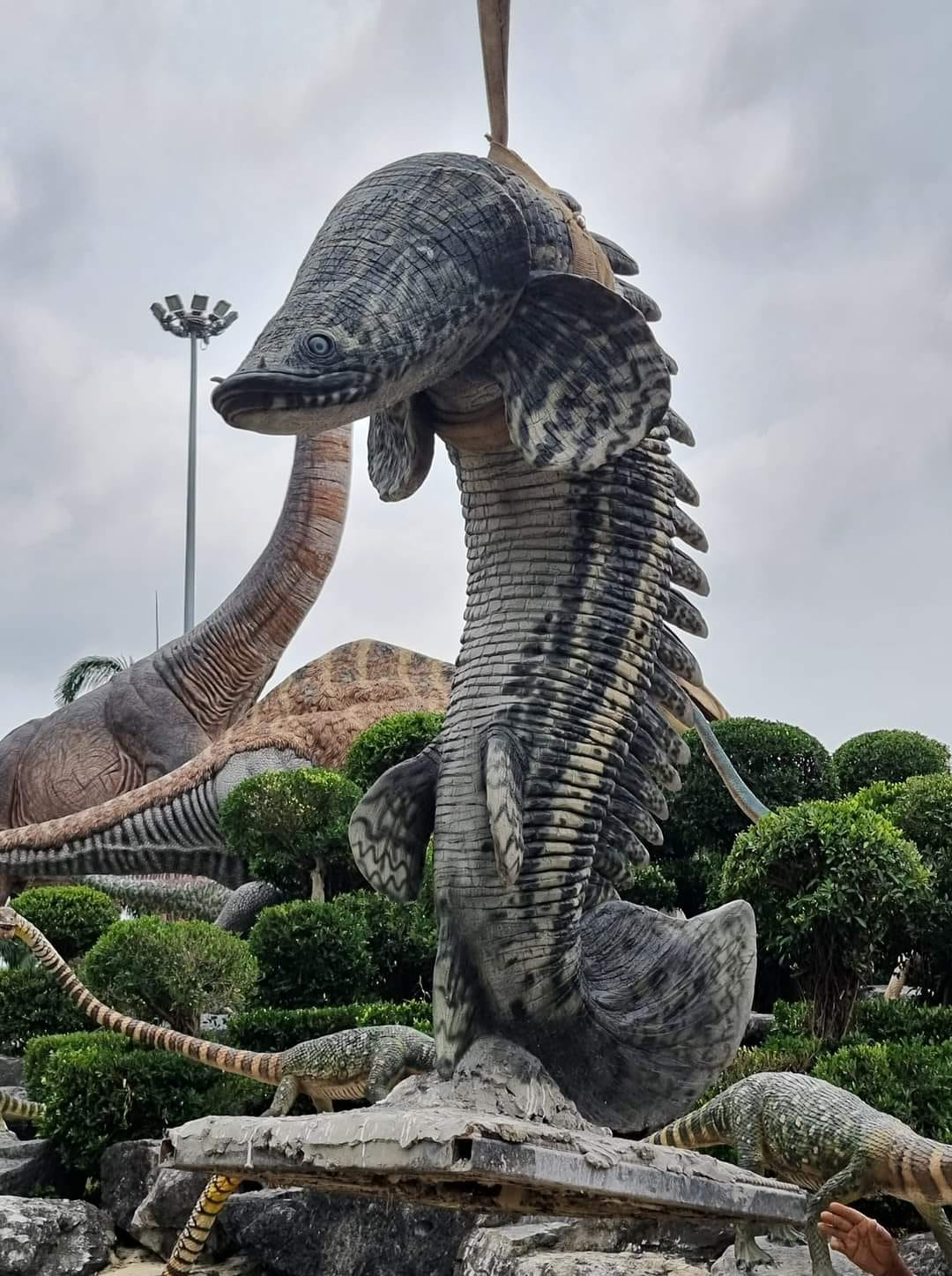
A Polypterus bichir statue of an illustration from The Bichir Handbook, being lowered into position at Nong Nooch Tropical Garden, Thailand.

As part of their Dinosaur Valley attraction, Nong Nooch Tropical Garden installed statues of the illustrations inside the book, each exceeding 1.5 metres in length. They include the extant Polypterus senegalus, P. palmas and P. bichir, with the project aiming to complete statues of each species of polypterid. The founder of Dinosaur Valley, Thapanut Uvijitr, explained he chose these illustrations to construct into statues thanks to their "accurate meristics and identifiable features".

=== Awards and honors ===
The Bichir Handbook has been nominated for the following awards.

| Year | Organisation | Award Title, Category | Result | References |
|---|---|---|---|---|
| 2020 | FIIN Biodiversity Drawing Competition | Nature Drawing | Won | |
| 2021 | Best Indie Book Awards | Non-Fiction (Ichthyology) | Won | |
| 2021 | Best Indie Book Awards | Illustration | Won | |
| 2021 | National Indie Excellence Awards | Animals & Pets | Won | |
| 2021 | Next Generation Indie Book Awards | Best Overall Design (Non-Fiction) | Nominated | |
| 2021 | Next Generation Indie Book Awards | Animals/Pets | Nominated | |
