= P. senegalus =

P. senegalus may refer to:

- Polypterus senegalus, the gray bichir, Senegal bichir, Cuvier's bichir or dinosaur eel, a freshwater ray-finned fish species
- Poicephalus senegalus, the Senegal parrot, a bird species found in western Africa

== See also ==
- Senegalus
