= Fishes of the Orinoco in the Wild =

2020 non-fiction book by Ivan Mikolji

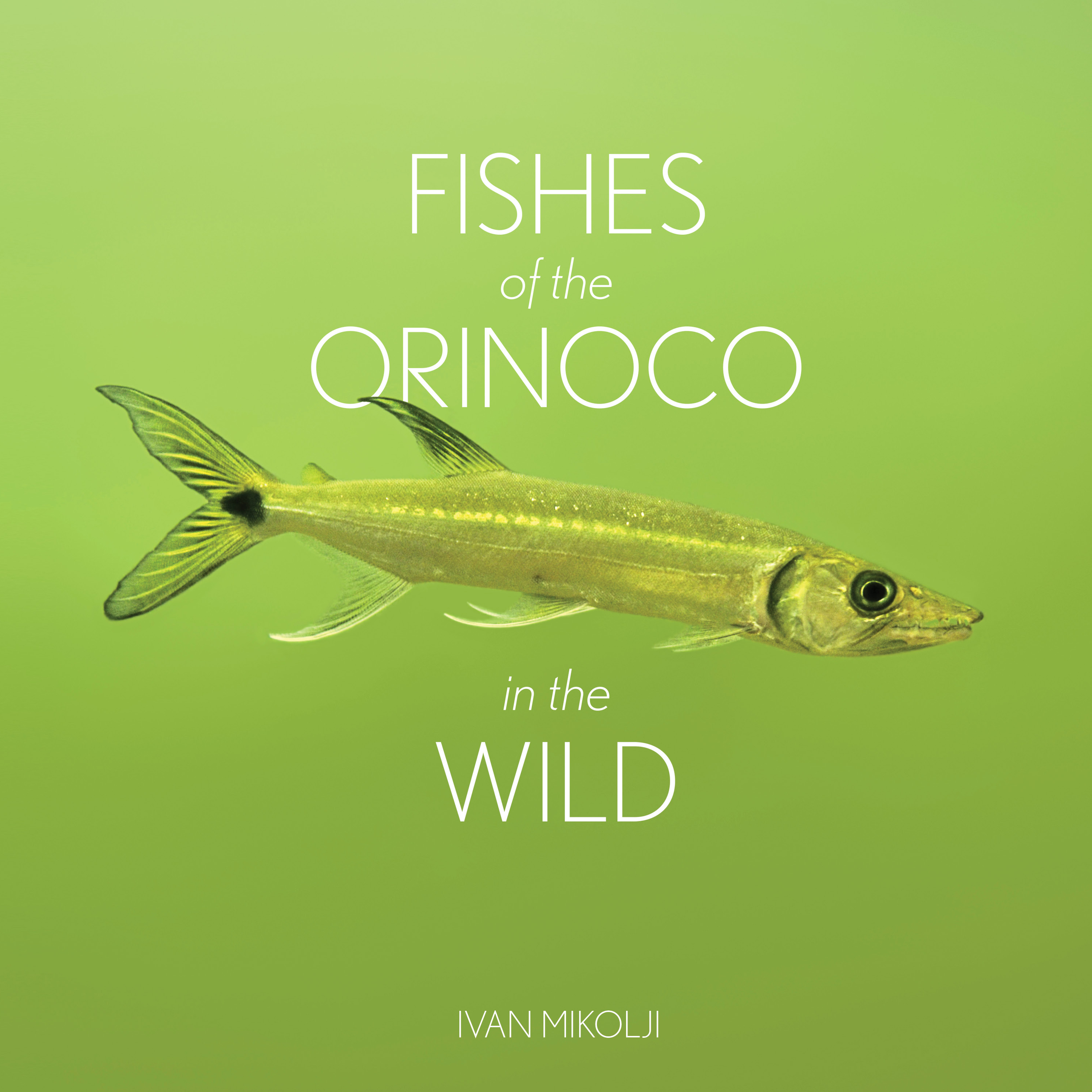
- Author: Ivan Mikolji
- Language: English
- Genres: Ichthyological literature
- Published: October 2020
- Publisher: TJ International
- Publication place: United Kingdom
- Media type: Hardback
- Pages: 392pp
- ISBN: 978-1-83853-883-5
- OCLC: 1201655786
- Website: mikolji.com

Fishes of the Orinoco in the Wild is a book written by photographer, artist and aquatic explorer Ivan Mikolji from Caracas, Venezuela. about aquatic fishes found in the Venezuelan and Colombian Amazon rainforest. In the book, Mikolji documents the underwater fishes in the Orinoco River catchment. The book was designed by Joshua Pickett, author of The Bichir Handbook.

The book features over 150 species of freshwater fish. The work encompasses the fishes of the Orinoquia in Venezuela, Colombia, the Amazonas inselbergs, and other areas in the tropical rainforests of the Guiana Shield.

The author describes the behavior of fish species in their natural habitats and information of their localities, water temperature, pH, and other fish and plant species that share their biotopes. The book also includes the etymology of their scientific names, and tips for underwater photography.

The book won the Honorable Mention Prize in the 2022 Next Generation Indie Book Awards.
