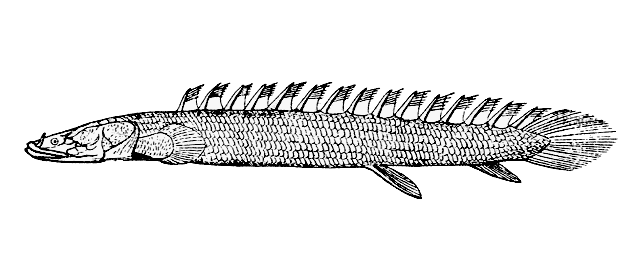
- Polypterus bichir bichir

Conservation status
- Least Concern (IUCN 3.1)

Scientific classification
- Kingdom: Animalia
- Phylum: Chordata
- Class: Actinopterygii
- Order: Polypteriformes
- Family: Polypteridae
- Genus: Polypterus
- Species: P. bichir

Binomial name
- Polypterus bichir Lacépède, 1803

Subspecies
- P. b. ornatus Arambourg 1948; P. b. bichir Geoffroy Saint-Hilaire 1809; P. b. lapradei Steindachner 1869
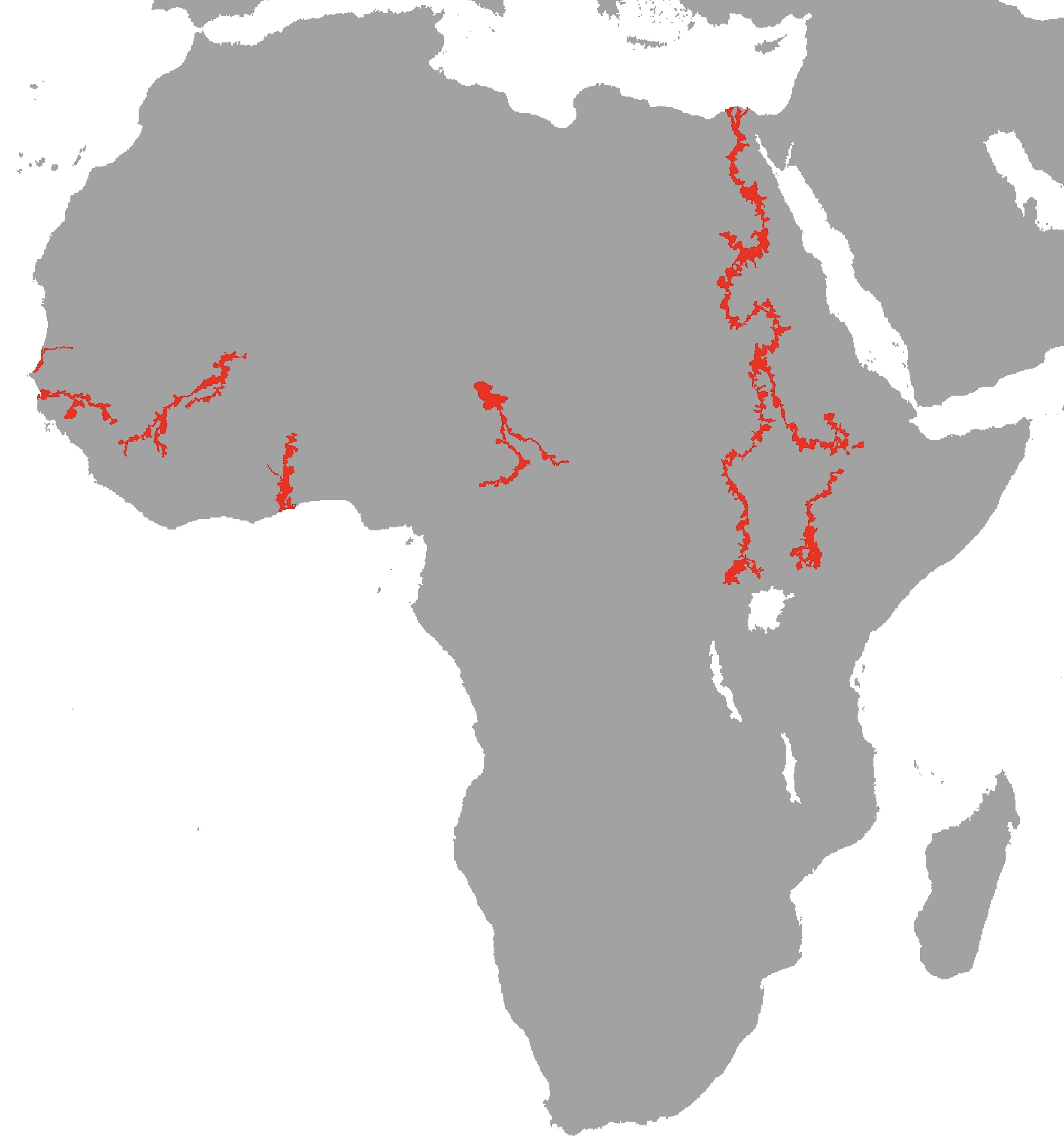

Synonyms
- Polypterus niloticus Shaw 1804; Polypterus lapradei Steindachner 1869

= Polypterus bichir =

Nile bichir

Species of fish

Polypterus bichir, the Nile bichir, is a fish which lives in the Nile and some of its tributaries in Africa. It is a dark grayish color on the top, with a dark vertical marking and bands on the flank. This marking is more prominent on juveniles, and fades as the fish grows.

== Description ==
Polypterus bichir lives in the Nile and some of its tributaries in Africa. It is a dark grayish color on the top, with a dark vertical marking and bands on its elongated flank. This marking is more prominent on juveniles, and fades as the fish grows. The Nile bichir is characterized by 5-18 dorsal finlets made up of a dorsal spine and connected dorsal ray. This is noted in the etymology of this species name where Polypterus can be traced back to the Greek words meaning 'many' and 'wing', noting the dorsal finlets. The fish itself is elongated in an anguilliform body plan, with flexible movement. Their swimming style itself mimics eels, with powerful sweeps of its long tail and free movement of the head from side-to-side, otherwise known as an undulatory motion. The bichir's pectoral fins, meanwhile, operate to keep the fish balanced through this process.

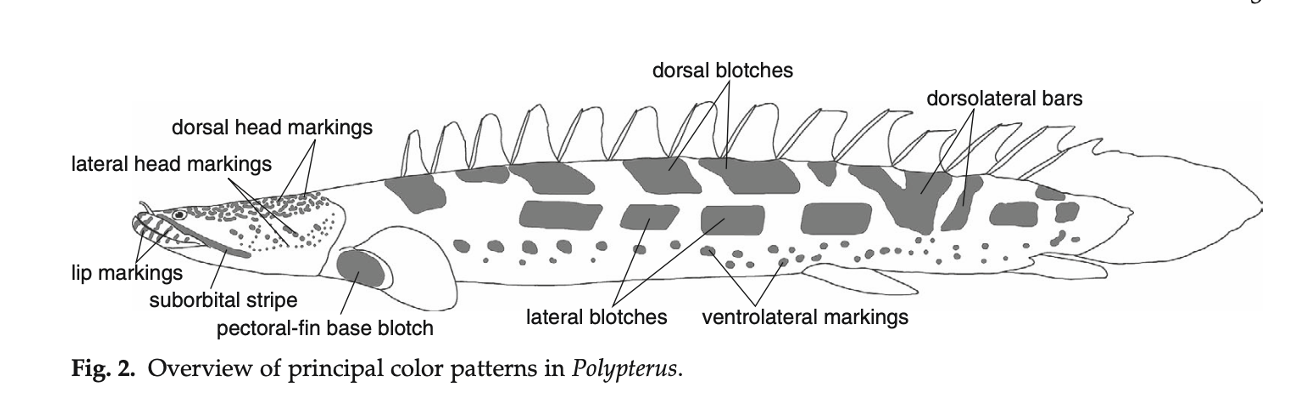
Descriptive Guide of Polypterus traits and markings

Nile bichirs are often regarded as ancestral 'primitive' fish due to their unique morphology that is usually found only in ancestral actinopterygian fish. Along with the dorsal finlets and coloring, the bichir is known for possessing 'armor-like' ganoid scales, true lungs, holoblastic egg development, sexually dimorphic anal fins, and spiracles. In captivity, bichir larvae and juveniles initially show fast growth up to a certain, species-specific, size but subsequently growth rates slow down once they reach maturity. P. bichir can grow as large as 750mm length wise from the tip of the snout to the end of the caudal peduncle, not including their caudal fin.

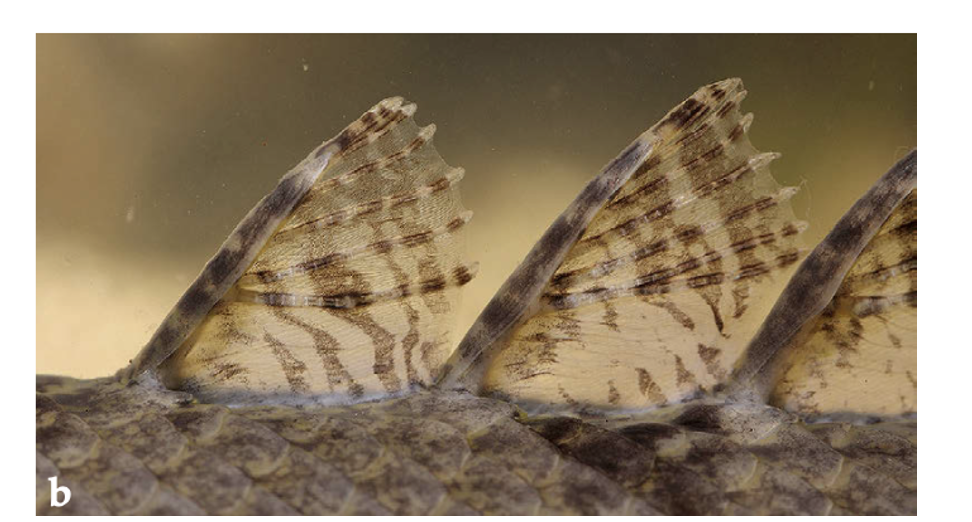
Photo of Bichir Dorsal finlets, the spine and ray can be seen connected.

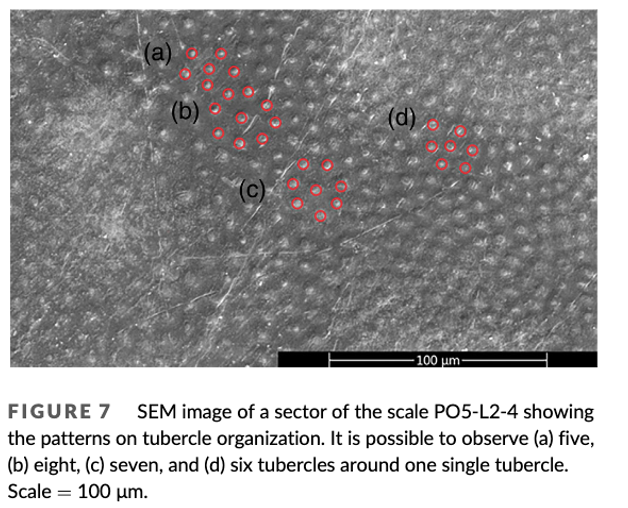
Sample of Tubercle variation in its organization within the same Bichir scale

There are 13 recognized species of bichirs that are often hard to distinguish from one another due to similarity in their general appearance. Nile bichirs are known for being one of the 'larger body morphs' for bichir species; their size, higher number of dorsal finlets, wider heads and lower jaw placement are identifying characteristics used to differentiate Nile bichir from other bichir species. However, these identifying characteristics are often hard to distinguish, especially jaw placement, as juvenile Nile bichir jaws are still found higher in a terminal position of the head, which can lead to mislabeling of specimens, and has in the past. Other methods of differentiating bichir species were to compare the tubercle, enamel-like ganoin with small bumps found on their ganoid scales, density, distance, and organization. It was theorized that these 'ornamentations' of the ganoid scales might be consistent within a species and differ from others. These scales make up most fossil records for Polypterus species as they preserve well and therefore can be easily studied. However, tubercle organization in the studied specimens varied greatly within the same species, across different regions of the body and even within the same scales. This study de-based former classification tools used by researchers for identification of bichir species.

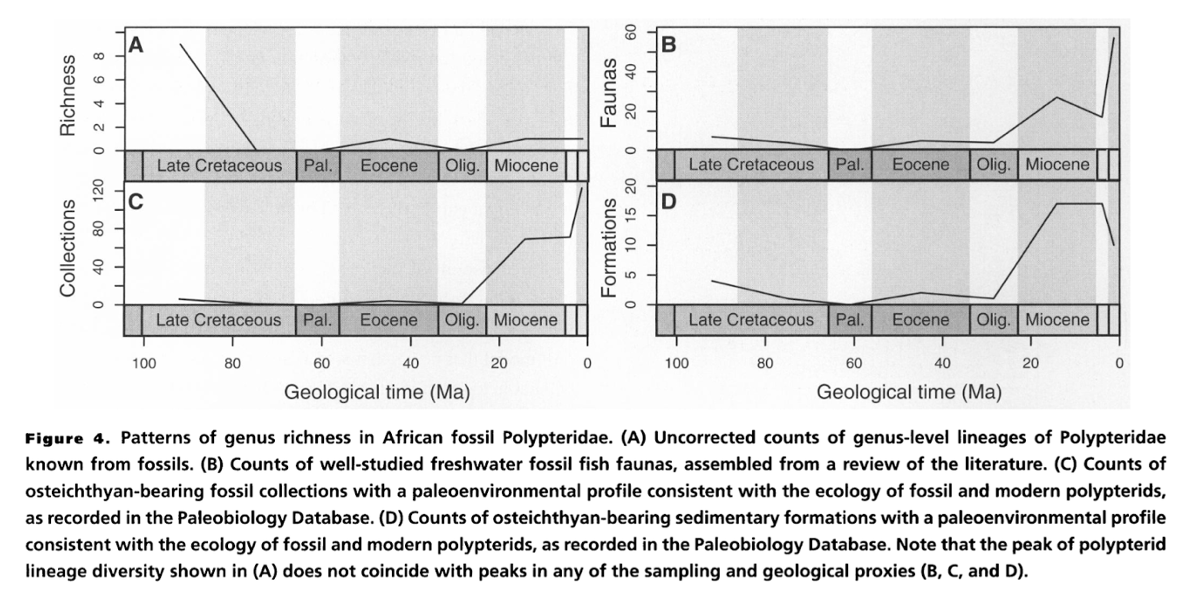
Data Sample indicating the main time periods of diversification for Polypteridae versus other groups.

Nile bichirs are often regarded as ancestral 'primitive' fish due to their unique morphology that is usually found only in ancestral fish. Along with the dorsal finlets and coloring, the bichir is known for possessing 'armor-like' ganoid scales, true lungs, holoblastic egg development, sexually dimorphic anal fins, and spiracles. This is because polypterid were one of the earliest diverging groups from where they nest under the class Actinopterygii. Polypteridae, the family classification of Nile bichir, are thought to have diversified differently from other ray-finned fishes, with most diversification taking place in the Late Cretaceous period before declining in a 'Boom and Bust' style.

== Distribution ==
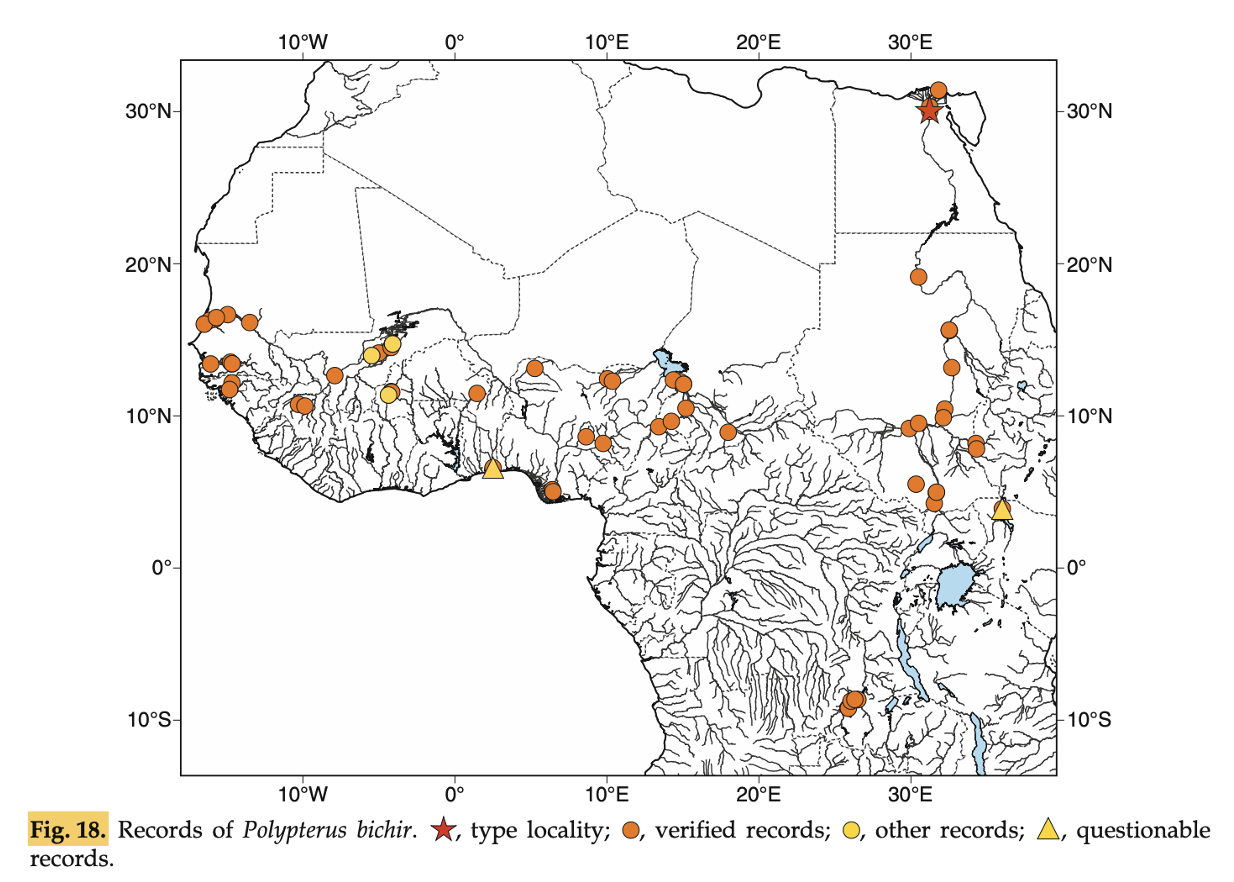
Map depicting the regional distribution of Nile bichir in Africa. The Key lists the symbols and their associated meanings of validity of the records.

The Nile bichir is one of the more highly distributed species across Africa, ranging from the Nile River to the Congo Basin to West African countries like Senegal. P. Bichir live in the deeper depressions of muddy riverbeds, sometimes considered a bottom-living fish, bichir are still active swimmers and travel mostly at night in search of food.

== Biology ==
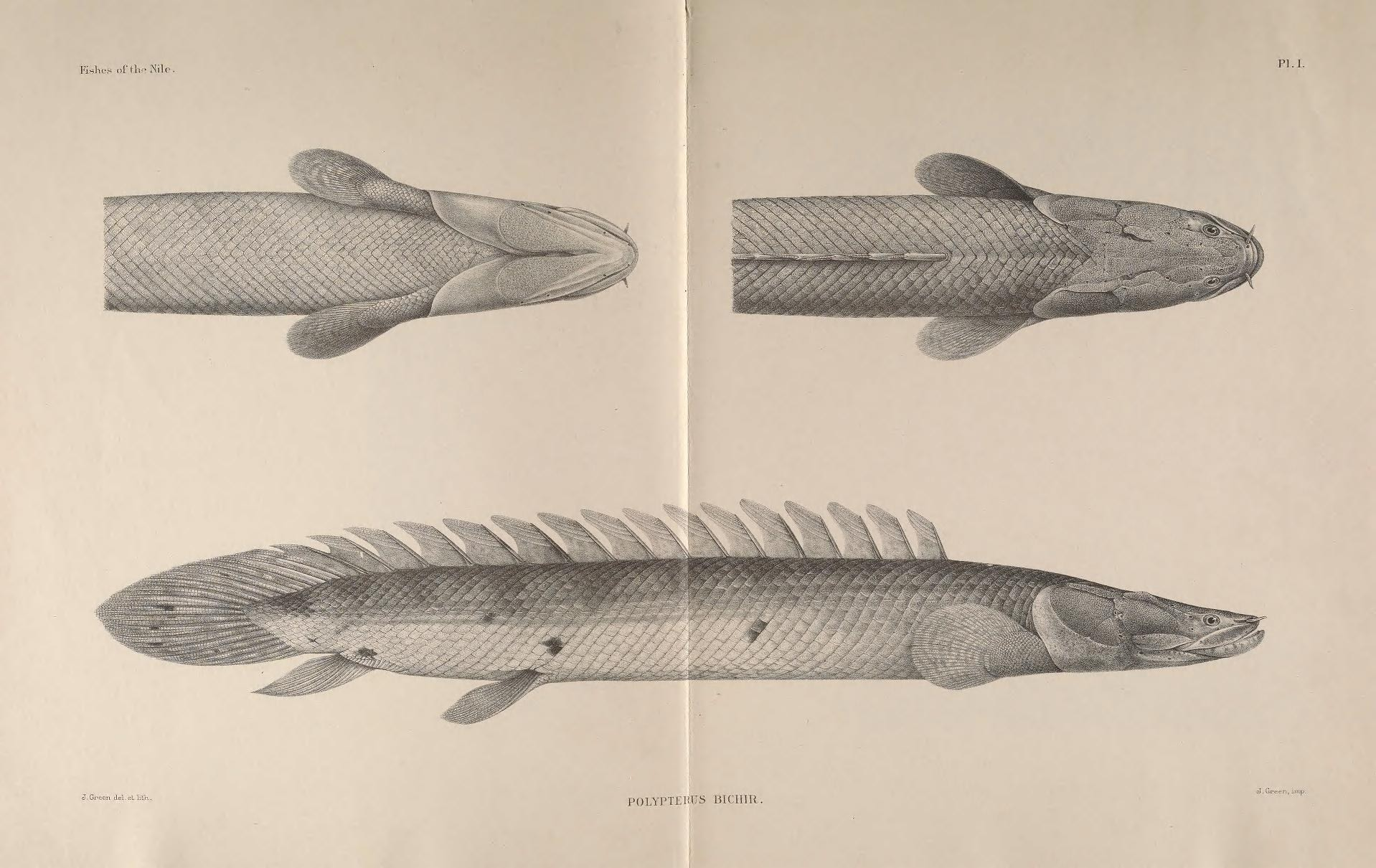
Illustration showing some of the features of P. bichir

Most of the features found in bichir are adaptations to both fish and invertebrate predators found in the swamps and rivers of tropical Africa the fish reside in. Ganoid scales and dorsal spines act as defensive measures for bichir to protect themselves from predators. Ganoid scales are hard, bony scales that act as 'armor' for the fish, comprising three layers of scales. Ganoid scales are usually rhomboidal in shape and connect through a 'peg and socket' joint. They are the scales that arose in the class, Actinopterygii and are often found in primitive fossils of actinopterygians as well as Chondrostean. Ganoid scales are modified cosmoid scales with the cosmine replaced with dentine and the surface vitrodentine replaced with ganoine. Ganoine, which cover the Ganoid scales, are made up of an inorganic bone salt that has calcified into noncellular material. It is considered analogous to teeth enamel in vertebrae (Helfman et al, 2009).

=== Respiration ===
Bichirs are also known to possess spiracles, maxillary (upper jaw) bones fused to the skull and a set of true lungs. The lungs of Bichirs are paired, well-developed, and vascularized to allow atmospheric air to regularly be taken in for respiration. Air uptake can occur in two different ways, through the mouth or the spiracles. In poorly oxygenated waters, bichir are obligate air-breathers, and without access to the surface can drown. Juvenile bichirs have external gills, which sometimes can persist for a long time into maturity in different species of bichir. It is believed that the common ancestors of Nile bichir, sarcopterygians and actinopterygians, already possessed lungs, but as polypterid are believed to be the earliest diverging group of actinopterygians, they display many ancestrally associated traits, like these lungs. Polypterus have a similar molecular mechanism of lung development to tetrapods, suggesting that there is a common ancestor to both major ancestral fish lineages, sarcopterygians and actinopterygians that developed evolution for air breathing. The presence of lungs in ancestral fish also points out that the evolution of lungs did not come with the terrestrialization of vertebrates and can further shed understanding on ancestral osteichthyan traits with further research.

=== Diet ===
Nile bichirs are often found hunting prey in the vegetated shallow beds of the water bodies it inhabits, using suction-feeding. Suction feeding - the process of rapid oral cavity expansion to draw prey into its mouth, is often found in ancestral Osteichthyes fishes like bichirs. Most fish often use protrusible jaws to achieve this mechanism, but the bichir is unique in that they lack these protrusible jaws and instead have a relatively simplified mechanism of achieving this feeding method. Instead, they generate their feeding strike power from their body flexibility coordinated with various muscular and skeletal structure movements to create a vacuum, suction force, that draws the prey in. Nile bichir can project cartilaginous-supported labial folds to form a funnel to further aid in this suction feeding mechanism. Bichirs stomachs are adapted to swallow prey whole, the gastric muscles working in tandem to compress the dangerous spines found on their prey, preventing their stomach pouch from being torn. Among these vegetated shallow beds, P. bichir often hunt for aquatic and terrestrial invertebrates, fish and amphibians, with the size of prey depending on the size of their mouths but can eat fish up to half their size. Nile bichirs rely heavily on their sense of smell to achieve this as they navigate the swamps, rivers and lakes they live in.

=== Reproduction ===
In nature, spawning normally occurs in densely vegetated areas, often flooding plains. Bichir often reach sexual maturity within a year, and their eggs are relatively large, and adhesive with a single micropyle. Yet, what really begins the spawning process is the sexually dimorphic anal fins that male and female Nile bichir possess. These unique anal fins are associated with a unique mating behavior, which uses sexually dimorphic anal fins as a part of courtship. These anal fins are copulatory organs, with the male fins being 'wider and rounded' and the females described as 'pointed and narrow'. Male polypteridae anal fins are 'blown-up' to form a cup-shaped organ and copulatory chamber. The process begins when, as the male swims alongside a female P. bichir, it will direct its anal fin, folded up like a gutter towards the vent of the female, fertilizing the eggs as they are released. This complex process is theorized to be a product of necessity to ensure all sperm released are successful as male bichir gonads are significantly smaller than females.

== Conservation status ==
Currently, the Nile bichir is listed as Least Concerned based on the January 2020 reassessment of the IUCN Red list. Regardless, Nile bichir are still highly impacted by human activities like fishing and habitat alteration. Yet due to the limited knowledge on bichir, it is hard to determine if their populations are indeed stable or declining. In Egypt, the subspecies Polypterus bichir bichir is considered regionally extinct due to a variety of impacts placed on the species and its environment, often from habitat use and human impacts. The main major threats to freshwater fish of North Africa, where the Nile River flows through, include groundwater extraction and water pollution, as well as natural disasters such as drought and temperature extremes. Harvesting fish, while also impactful to local populations affects these fish to a lesser extent.
