= Polypterus mokelembembe =

Conservation status
- Least Concern (IUCN 3.1)

Scientific classification
- Domain: Eukaryota
- Kingdom: Animalia
- Phylum: Chordata
- Class: Actinopterygii
- Order: Polypteriformes
- Family: Polypteridae
- Genus: Polypterus
- Species: P. mokelembembe

Binomial name
- Polypterus mokelembembe Schliewen & Schäfer, 2006
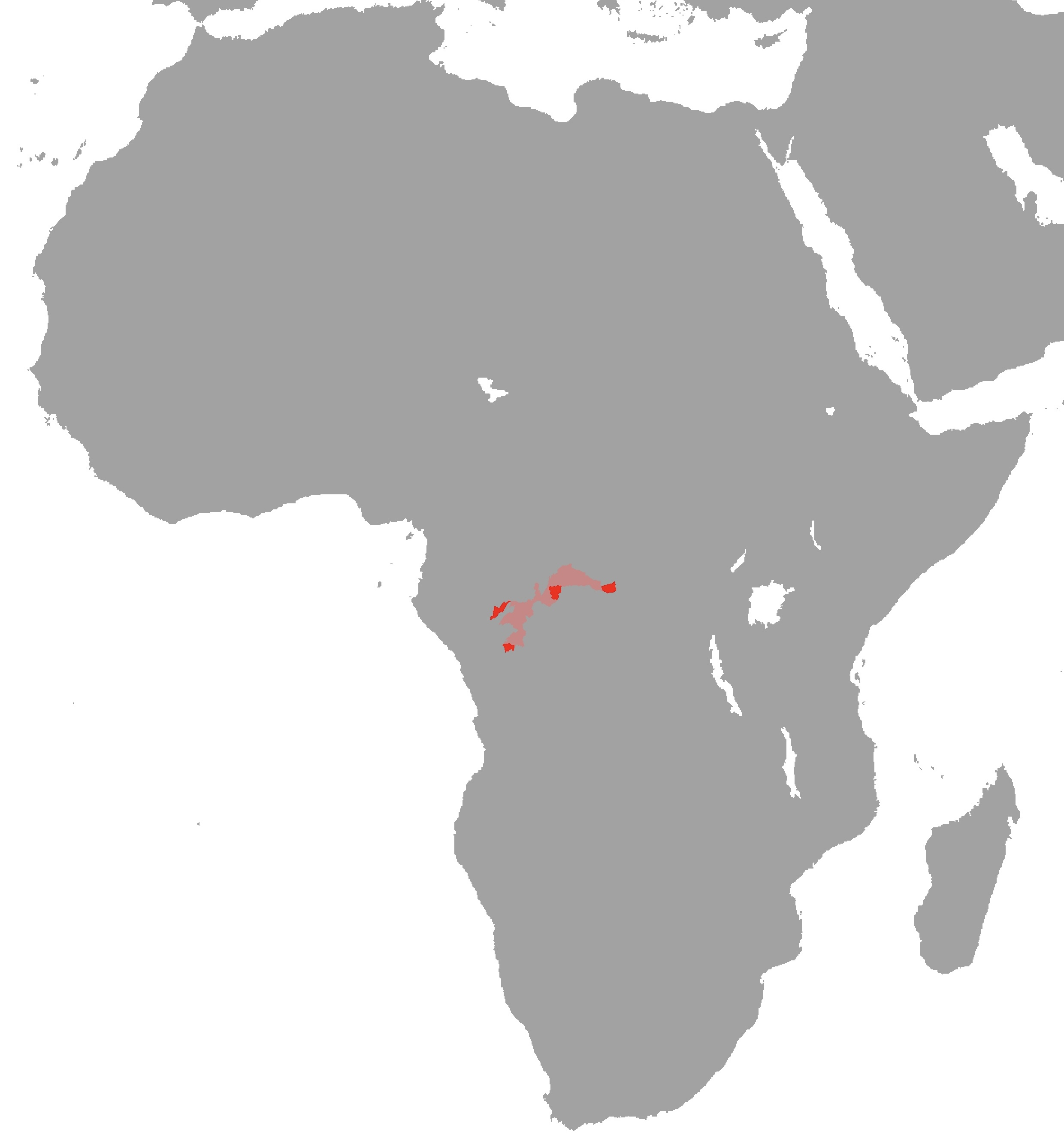

Species of fish

Polypterus mokelembembe is a species of the fish genus Polypterus, found in the central basin of the Congo River. It was once considered a morph of the closely related Polypterus retropinnis, but was given species status in 2006 with a description that reclassified both fishes. Because of the recency of the species' description and the fact that P. mokelembembe is the paralectotype of P. retropinnis, they are often mistaken for one another in the aquarium trade.

== Etymology ==
The species was named after the Mokèlé-mbèmbé, a mythological creature believed by some to be a sauropod dinosaur that survived the extinction of dinosaurs in the central Congo Basin. This is in reference to the fact that Polypteriformes are stabilomorphic organisms, or "living fossils," and existed at the same time as non-avian dinosaurs, and the fact that P. mokelembembe is itself endemic to the Congo Basin.

== Description ==
P. mokelembembe is the smallest extant Polypterid, reaching a maximum recorded adult length of 14 inches (36 cm). It is somewhat similar in appearance to P. retropinnis, which it was once considered to be conspecific with, but differs in maximum adult size, patterning, coloration, scale count, and fin ray count.

They exhibit countershading, with a dark green or yellowish dorsal side with brown blotching and a cream-colored underside. Depending on the substrate they are kept on, their colors can vary wildly; they are a dull brownish-green on light-colored sand, but turn a very vibrant green on dark sand. They also exhibit a continuous, dark-colored suborbital stripe along their cheeks and lips that starkly contrasts against their rather plain coloration, as well as dark-colored nares and distinct barring on the pectoral and caudal fins. Their irises are also often a deep red color, which is another distinguishing trait of this species.

Like all bichirs, they are amphibious fish. They occur in densely vegetated streams and swamps where seasonal droughts deplete their ability to process oxygenated water. As a "living fossil," one of their stabilomorphic traits is that similarly to stem-tetrapods, they use a blowhole-like organ called a spiracle to take breaths of atmospheric oxygen. If their gills remain sufficiently wet, they can survive on land indefinitely. They are a nocturnal, benthic, obligatorily carnivorous species that mostly feeds on invertebrates.

Juvenile P. mokelembembe have external gills that resemble those of young amphibians. These gills are large and have branching, featherlike architecture to maximize surface area for oxygen exchange to compensate for the young fish's underdeveloped respiratory system. As the fish age and their lungs develop, they lose these external gill structures and take on the gill structure of a typical fish.

Like most bichirs, P. mokelembembe's vision is somewhat lackluster, so it instead hunts using its lateral line and sense of smell. As a "living fossil," one of its stabilomorphic traits is its accessory olfactory organ—an internal structure that has become vestigial or nonexistent in most extant fishes. Due to its retention of this organ and elongate, nostril-like structures called nares, P. mokelembembe has a very precise sense of smell.

== In the aquarium ==
P. mokelembembe is rarely seen in the aquarium trade. Breeding this species is prohibitively difficult to achieve in captivity due to them being extremely particular seasonal spawners, somewhat difficult to sex as subadults (which they are usually imported and sold as), and generally quite uncommon to come by. As a result, virtually all P. mokelembembe in the aquarium trade are wild caught. It is only very occasionally exported outside of Africa, and because this species is highly desired by Polypterid collectors, they tend to be difficult to obtain for hobbyists. Before its elevation to species status in 2006, it was sometimes called "Polypterus sp. 'Congo'" in the aquarium hobby (not to be confused with Polypterus congicus, which is also called "Congo bichir" in the aquarium trade). Because of the confusion about the name of this fish and the fact that it is often mistaken for P. retropinnis by importers and wholesalers, great care must be taken to ensure that the right species is purchased.

Behaviorally, P. mokelembembe is very docile for a bichir and tends to be submissive to its tankmates in captivity, often ending up at the bottom of the pecking order in aquariums with multiple species of bichirs. As shy, nocturnal creatures, they appreciate lots of shade and places to hide. They can be sustained on a diet of frozen or live foods, such as bloodworms or earthworms. Like most bichirs, they are very hardy and can tolerate a wide range of water chemistries and dissolved oxygen levels due to their ability to process atmospheric oxygen.
