= West African bichir =

Conservation status
- Least Concern (IUCN 3.1)

Scientific classification
- Kingdom: Animalia
- Phylum: Chordata
- Class: Actinopterygii
- Order: Polypteriformes
- Family: Polypteridae
- Genus: Polypterus
- Species: P. retropinnis

Binomial name
- Polypterus retropinnis Vaillant, 1899
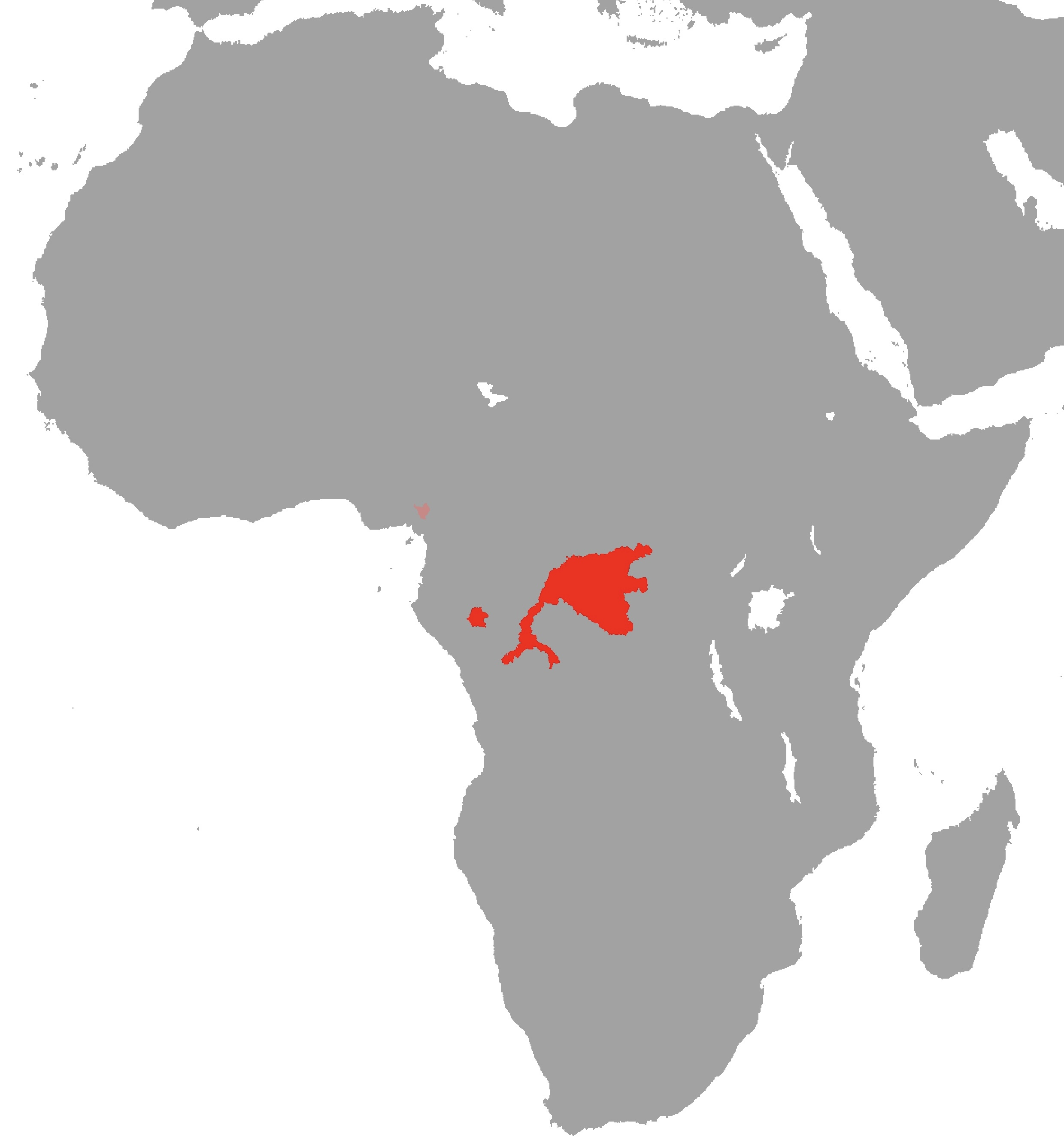

Synonyms
- Polypterus retropinnis retropinnis Vaillant 1899

Species of fish

The West African bichir or retropinnis bichir (Polypterus retropinnis), is a freshwater fish in the family Polypteridae, is found in the central Congo River basin and Ogooué River in Africa. It is a long, slender fish that grows to a maximum length of about 34 cm (13 in).

== Description ==
Bichirs are primitive fish which have a jaw structure that resembles that of tetrapods rather than bony fishes; they also have rudimentary lungs and two slit-like spiracles used for exhalation, and can breathe air when there is insufficient oxygen in the water. The West African bichir has an elongated cylindrical body with a maximum length of 34 cm (13 in). It can be distinguished from other members of the genus by having jaws that are about the same length, and in living specimens, having creamy-white irises speckled with black. The dorsal fin consists of 7 to 9 separate finlets each topped with a sharp spine. The pectoral fin is fleshy and has 30 to 32 soft rays and the anal fin has 12 to 15 spines. The dorsal surface and flanks are olive brown with irregular markings of darker brown and the ventral surface is whitish or pale beige. The dorsal and caudal fins are pale beige with dark marks in rows, and black blotches at the base of the spines. The pectoral fins have distinctive black blotches at the base and rows of tiny black spots on the webbing. The pelvic and anal fins are whitish.

== Distribution ==
The West African bichir is a freshwater fish native to tropical West Africa. Its range includes the basins of the Ogooué River and the Congo River, and possibly the Cross River basin in Cameroon. Its typical habitat is swamps and floodplains.

== Behaviour ==
This species is territorial, with territory holders threatening intruders. The attacker starts the encounter by raising its dorsal fin spines and emitting staccato thumping sounds; both fish may continue by biting at each other, or one may submit and flee, emitting drawn-out moans.

== Use in aquaria ==
P. retropinnis is sometimes kept in aquaria. It will feed on small to medium-sized vertebrates and invertebrates, eating anything it can fit into its mouth.
