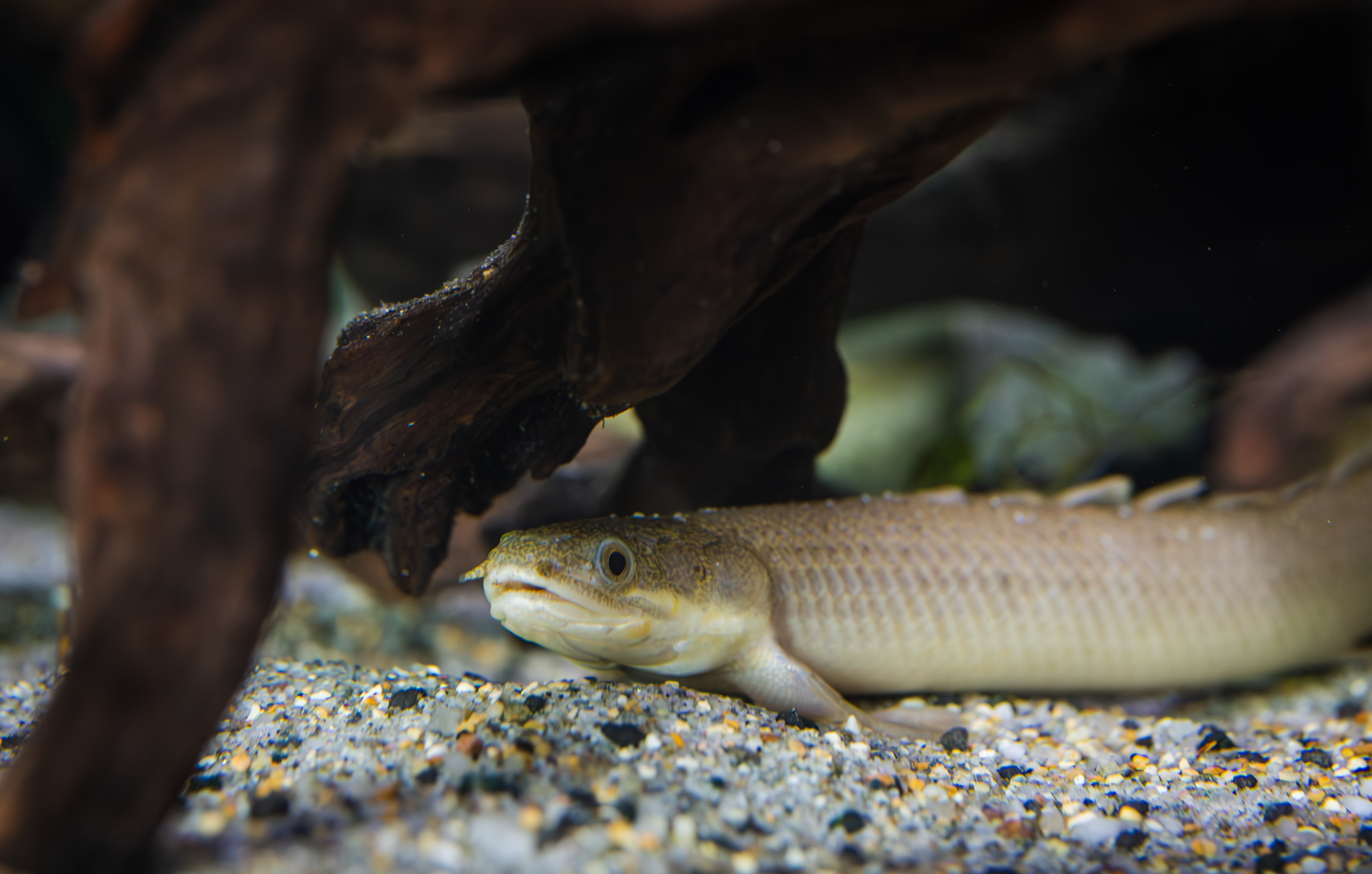

Conservation status
- Least Concern (IUCN 3.1)

Scientific classification
- Kingdom: Animalia
- Phylum: Chordata
- Class: Actinopterygii
- Order: Polypteriformes
- Family: Polypteridae
- Genus: Polypterus
- Species: P. senegalus

Binomial name
- Polypterus senegalus Cuvier, 1829

Subspecies
- P. s. meridionalis (Poll 1941); P. s. senegalus Cuvier 1829
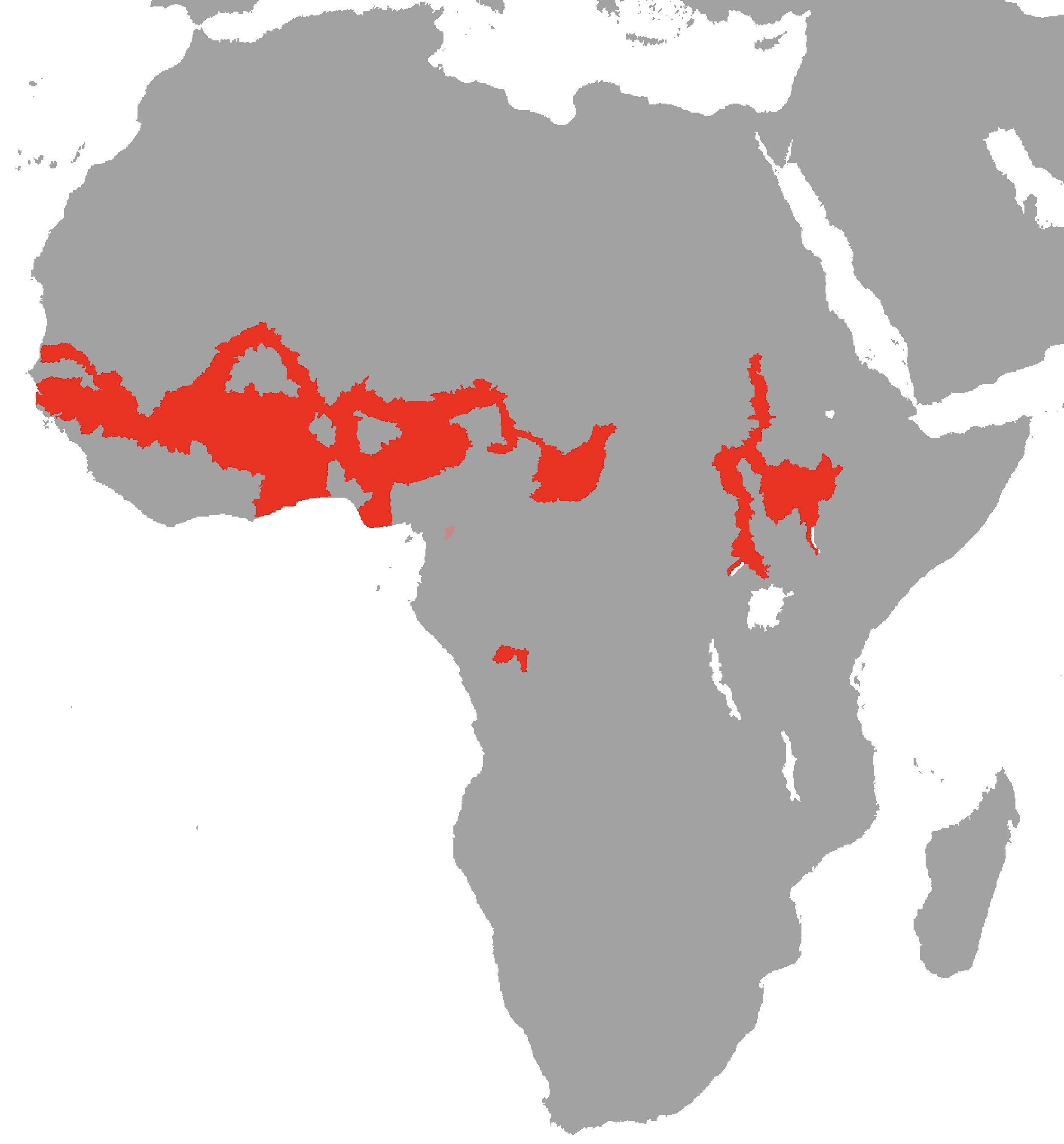

Synonyms
- Polypterus arnaudii Duméril 1870; Polypterus meridionalis Poll 1942

= Polypterus senegalus =

Species of fish

Polypterus senegalus, commonly known as the Senegal bichir, gray bichir or Cuvier's bichir, is an African species of ray-finned fish in the bichir family, Polypteridae. It is a typical example of polypterid fishes, as most of its defining physical features are common across the genus, such as its ancient, lungfish- or arowana-like appearance, the ability to breathe atmospheric oxygen, and its armor-like scales. These factors have influenced the species' popularity in captivity, and it is commonly kept by aquarists and other hobbyists.

P. senegalus is sometimes, confusingly, called the "dinosaur eel" or "dragon fish", among other misnomers; however, the bichir is not an eel, nor is it a reptile or dinosaur.

== Appearance ==
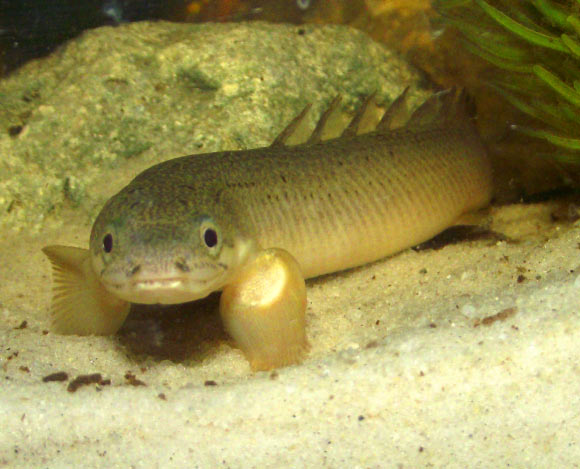
Senegal bichir

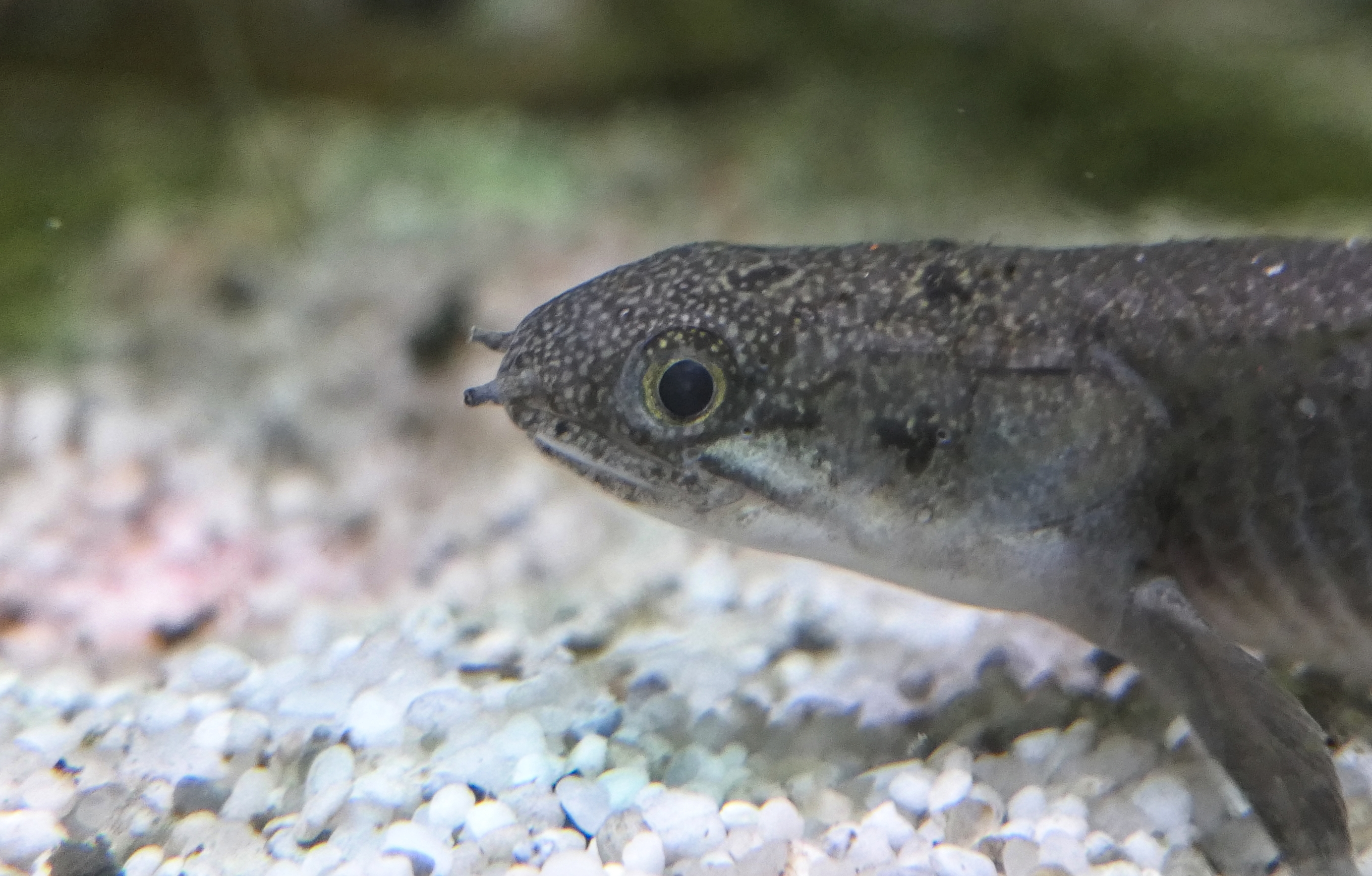
Protruding nostrils of P. senegalus.

Polypterus senegalus is an elongated fish, usually grey or beige in color, though sometimes displaying shades of white, pink or blueish; albino individuals also occur. Its body is covered in rhomboid-shaped, multilayered scales, with very subtle patterns and occasional darker blotches or dots. At the nose, the face is smooth and rounded, with larger scales than the rest of the fish. External nostrils protrude from the front. Eyes are on either side of the head, and they are usually pale yellow with a black pupil. P. senegalus has poor eyesight, and relies largely on sense of smell and subtle movements when detecting prey. The mouth is large and appears to grin when closed. The dentary, premaxilla, and maxilla each carry one row of large, slightly recurved teeth. There are multiple rows of smaller teeth between these rows of large teeth, on the prearticular and coronoids of the lower jaw, and on the bones forming the roof of the mouth.

The body is long and vaguely cylindrical; a serrated dorsal fin runs along most of the body until it meets the caudal fin, which is pointed and flat. There are 8–11 dorsal spines and 14–17 anal spines. The large, paddle-like pectoral fins attach just behind and below the gill openings, and are their primary means of locomotion, providing a slow, graceful appearance. P. senegalus is smaller than other bichirs, reaching about 35.5 cm (14 in). This fish exhibits sexual dimorphism, where the males are generally smaller than the females and have a thicker anal fin.

The fish has a pair of primitive lungs instead of a swim bladder, allowing it to periodically breathe atmospheric oxygen from the surface of the water. In the home aquarium, bichirs can be observed dashing to the surface for this purpose. Juvenile P. senegalus have external gills that disappear as they age.

This bichir's skin serves as a particularly effective armor, and has been studied as a model for personal armor for better combinations of protection and mobility.

== Reproduction ==
Polypterus senegalus breed during the rainy season in nature. During courtship, the male chases and nudges the female. The females lays 100–300 eggs within a few days. The male receives the eggs from the female by cupping his anal and caudal fins around her genitals. The male then fertilizes the eggs and scatters them in the vegetation. Egg hatching can take 3–4 days.

== Feeding ==
Polypterus senegalus feed on small vertebrates, insects, and crustaceans. They use suction feeding to ingest prey from the bottom of freshwater lakes and rivers. P. senegalus is said to consume anything it can swallow, which is why it is recommended that their tankmates be at least half of their size. They are opportunistic ambush predators, moving slowly and cautiously, and occasionally hiding, to capture their prey. Even though they are sold in pet stores as cute eel like fish, they can be real predators. They can hunt very little fish such as tetras, guppies, catfish, and any small fish that can fit in their mouth.

== Behavior ==
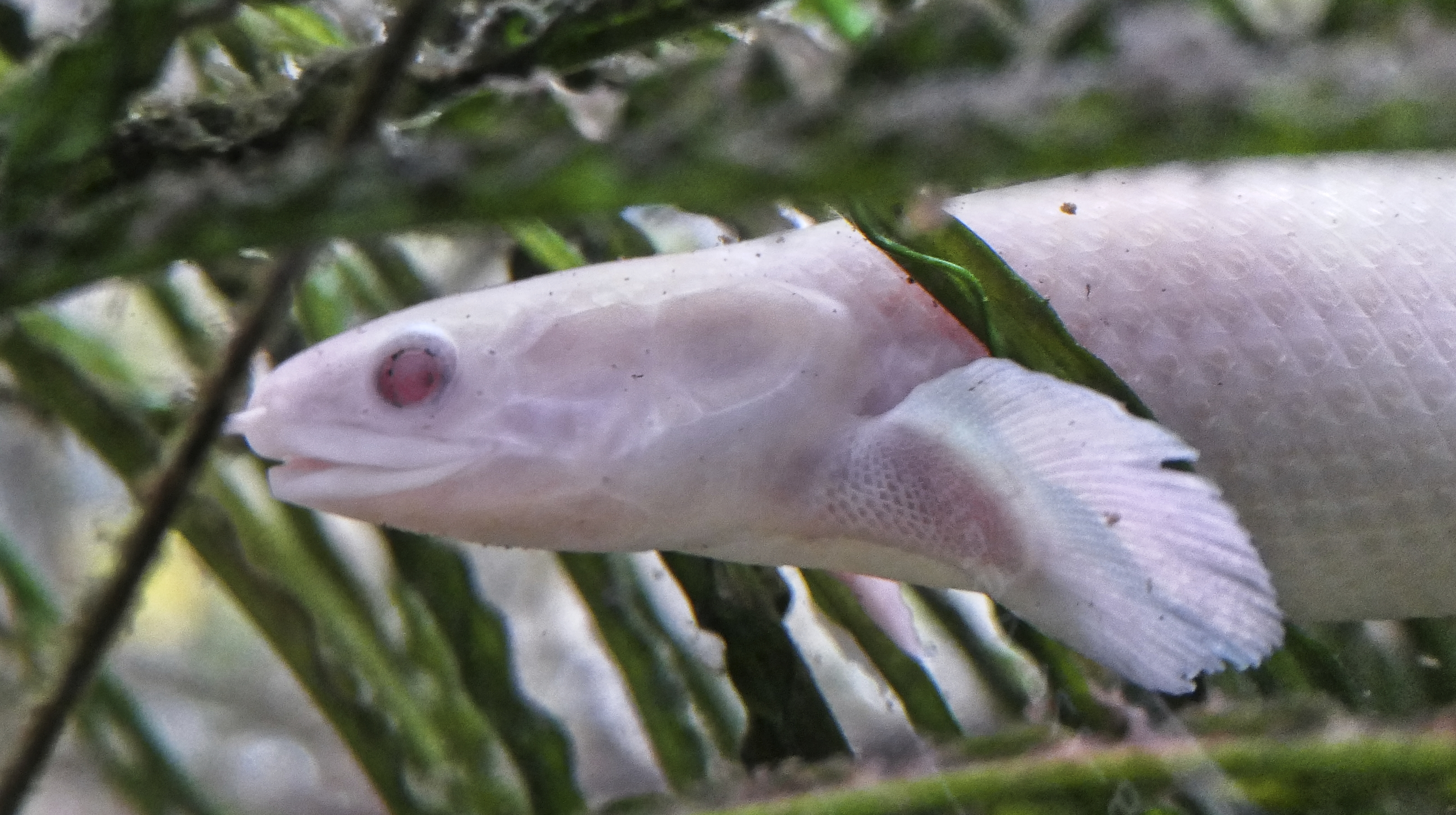
Albino P. senegalus.

During active hours, Polypterus senegalus swim about their environment, performing activities such as exploring, feeding, hunting, investigating changes, and scavenging. Social behavior is also observed, as P. senegalus sometimes follow each other moving about. Most individuals are inactive at night and rest low above the ground until sunrise.

== Subspecies ==
Three subspecies of P. senegalus are recognized: P. s. senegalus, P. s. meridionalis, and a further unnamed subspecies.

- P. s. senegalus grows to about 70 cm (28 in) in the wild, and 48 cm (19 in) in captivity. It is a uniform brownish-grey to olive color on the dorsal surface, and the ventral surface is whitish. No banding occurs on adults, but very young juveniles show three horizontal bands. The upper jaw is slightly longer than lower jaw. It has eight to 11 dorsal finlets.
- P. s. meridionalis grows to about 110 cm (44 in) in the wild, and 81 cm (32 in) in captivity. It is a uniform olive-grey color on the dorsal surface. The upper and lower jaws are about the same length. It has 9 or 10 dorsal spines. P. s. meridionalis may be a regional variant of P. s. senegalus.

== Distribution and habitat ==
This species of bichir is found in lakes, river margins, swamps, and floodplains of tropical Africa and the Nile river system, it occurs in at least twenty-six African countries which include Senegal, Egypt, Democratic Republic of Congo, Cameroon, Chad, Ethiopia, Kenya, Mali, Ivory Coast, Tanzania, Sudan, Nigeria, Gambia, Uganda, and others. Its distribution is widespread, detailed to include the Nile basin and West Africa (Senegal, Gambia, Niger, Volta, and Lake Chad basins, and Congo River Basin.

Provided the skin remains moist, P. senegalus can remain out of the water indefinitely – it can even be raised on land, where it uses its large pectoral fins to walk.

== Captivity ==
Bichirs are predatory fish; in captivity they will take any live or dead animal that can be swallowed or broken apart and then swallowed. Only its lack of speed prevents a bichir from emptying an aquarium of smaller fish. The pectoral fins only allow for slow cruising, and while it can achieve amazing bursts of speed, it cannot catch fish of average speed. Given enough time, any fish that can fit in the bichir's mouth will be eaten, including its tankmates. This fish should not be kept with any other fish smaller than three inches. It will also bite fins of other fishes if it can. P. senagalus can reach 10–15 years of age in captivity.

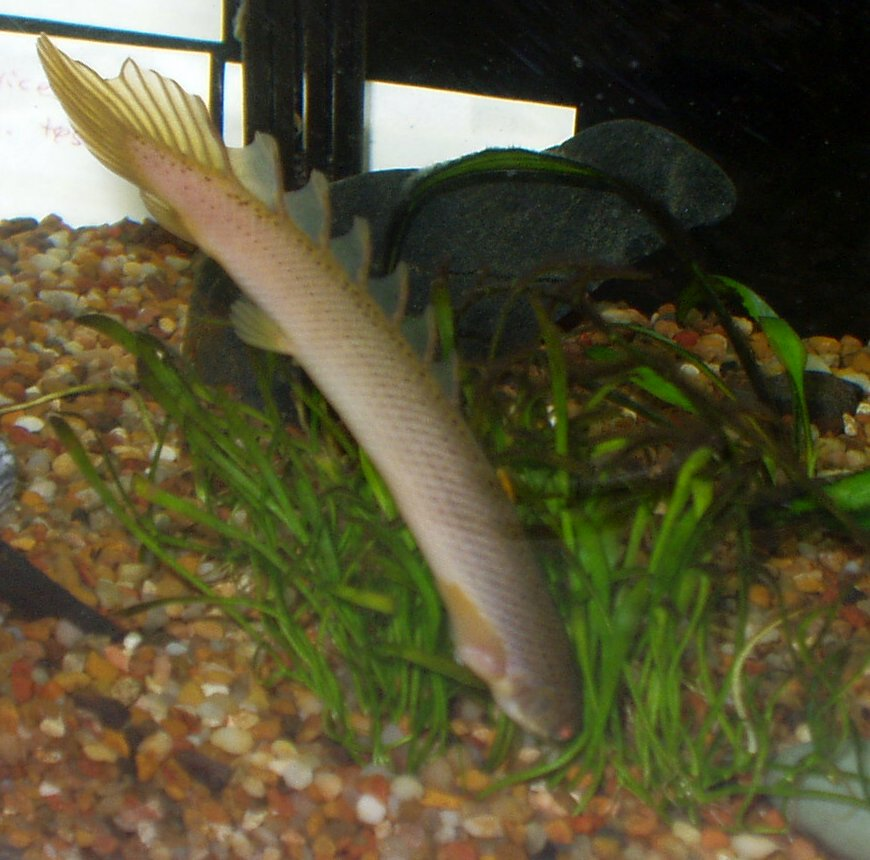
A juvenile bichir forages for food

== See also ==
- List of freshwater aquarium fish species
