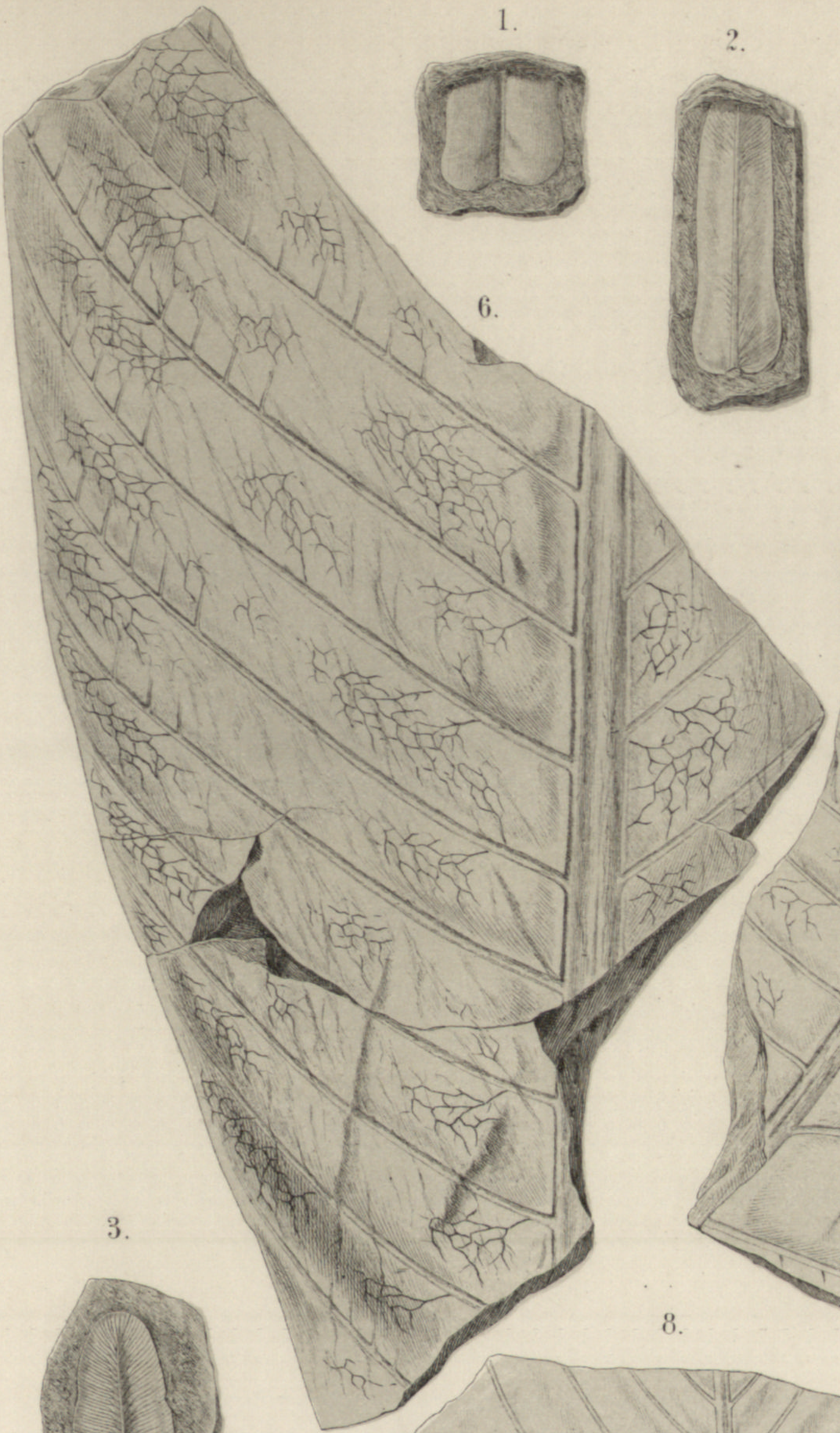
- The large illustration (#6) is the lectotype of the genus and the type species Gigantopteris nicotianaefolia.

Scientific classification
- Kingdom: Plantae
- Clade: Tracheophytes
- Clade: Spermatophytes
- Division: incertae sedis
- Order: †Gigantopteridales

Genera
- See text.

Synonyms
- Gigantonomiales S.Meyen

= Gigantopterid =

Gigantopterids Temporal range: Asselian–Late Permian

Extinct order of plants of the Permian period

Gigantopterids (Gigantopteridales) is an extinct, possibly polyphyletic group of seed plants known from the Permian period. Gigantopterids were among the most advanced land plants of the Paleozoic Era and disappeared around the Permian–Triassic extinction event around 252 million years ago. Though some lineages of these plants managed to persist initially, they either disappeared entirely or adapted radically, evolving into undetermined descendants, as surviving life prospered again in much-altered ecosystems. One hypothesis proposes that at least some "gigantopterids" became the ancestors of angiosperms and/or Bennettitales and/or Caytoniales.

Gigantopterid fossils were documented as early as 1883, but only investigated more thoroughly in the early 20th century. Some of their most significant evidence was initially found in Texas, but they might have been present worldwide. Another key region for gigantopterid fossils is in China, and the consolidation of all major continents into Pangea would have allowed for easy global dispersal. They were among the most striking and important plants of the Cathaysian flora of Sino-Malaya, also called Gigantopteris flora to reflect this.

At least some gigantoperids are thought to have grown as climbing plants.

== Description ==
External image
- Artistic illustration of gigantopterid climing behaviour, showing Gigantonoclea climbing up a Pecopteris tree fern

They bore many of the traits of flowering plants, but are not known to have flowered themselves. Gigantopterid plants had simple, bilaterally symmetrical leaf structures, woody stems and spines. They grew new parts by producing shoots, like flowering plants. Judging from the fossil remains, they were probably robust plants with fronds that resembled fern fronds when young. When mature they were more like flowering plant leaves with reticulate venation arranged in a frond. Gigantopteris nicotianaefolia for example is named thus because each of its leaflets resembles a tobacco leaf in shape.

They grew at least over 20 cm (around 10 in), probably over 50 cm (20 in) tall, depending on whether it grew as a scrambling vine or erect. Some apparently preferred wetlands, while others throve in rather arid habitats.

The vascular tissue contains vessel elements and in at least some taxa resembles that of the Gnetophyta. They had a cuticle similar to that of other seed plants. Some male sporangia (Gigantotheca) and seeds (Gigantonomia, Cornucarpus) have been tentatively referred to this group. While the sporangia are certainly not flowers, they differ from other sporangia of Permian plants.

Chemical analysis of fossil remains indicates that gigantopterids produced oleananes, chemical compounds otherwise known to be used by flowering plants, for which they function as a suppressant of insect pests. They are apparently also found in certain modern ferns however.

At least some gigantoperids were climbing plants that had stems that twined around host plants, with the gigantopterid Gigantonoclea thought to have done so around the tree fern Pecopteris, with the stem possibly twining in a helical pattern.

== Systematics ==
It is probable that the gigantopterids are a non-monophyletic form taxon. Plant life from their era is very difficult to document and organize. They have been variously allied with the "seed ferns" (another paraphyletic group of early seed plants) Peltaspermales and Callistophytales, Gnetum, and the Magnoliophyta. All that can be said at present is that they were spermatophytes. It is also highly unlikely that they were close relatives of acrogymnosperms, cycads or ginkgos, because these lineages were already established and distinct in the Late Permian.

Vegetative leaves of Emplectopteris were at one time included in this group. However, they had ovules attached to the underside of the fronds and are now placed in their own family (Emplectopteridaceae) within the Callistophytales.

Some prefer to refer to the presumed "core" taxa of this group as Gigantonomiales. However, many experts remain skeptical of the new name, because they consider such a move premature until more is known about the interrelationships of the genera of "gigantopterids" and the relationships of these to other plants.

Several genera have been named. Those then known were assigned to a family Gigantopteridaceae and numerous subfamilies by Gen-ichi Koidzumi. It appears as if at least some of his divisions ought to prove useful when a more definite phylogenetic, systematic and taxonomic arrangement for this group is eventually found. On the other hand, the Gigantopteridaceae would with near certainty have to be more narrowly circumscribed even if the Gigantopteridales are by and large verified as a clade; they might even become limited to the two or so genera now placed in the Gigantopteridieae.

=== Proposed subfamilies and genera ===
Cathaysiopteridieae - may be synonym of Palaeogoniopteridieae

- Cathaysiopteris
- Cathaysiopteridium

Gigantopteridieae (including Cardioglossieae)

- Gigantonoclea - includes Cardioglossum and apparently Progigantopteris
- Gigantopteris

Gothanopteridieae - may be synonym of Cathaysiopteridieae/Palaeogoniopteridieae

- Gothanopteris

Palaeogoniopteridieae

- Gigantopteridium
- Palaeogoniopteris
- Zeilleropteris

Unresolved

- Delnortea
- Emplectopteridium
- Emplectopteris
- Neogigantopteridium - probably Cathaysiopteridieae/Palaeogoniopteridieae
- Vasovinea

== Use as palaeoclimate proxies ==
Gigantopterids, like the angiosperms of the late Mesozoic and Cenozoic eras, have been used as proxy estimates for palaeoclimate through a process known as foliar physiognomy. Palaeohydroclimate can be estimated based on gigantopteran leaf size, with greater leaf size generally indicating greater precipitation. Additionally, the percentage of entire margined gigantopterid taxa in a palaeobotanical assemblage has been suggested to be a function of palaeotemperature.

== See also ==
Other Permian-Triassic seed plants of unclear relationships are:

- Glossopteridales
- Lyginopteridopsida
- Pentoxylales
