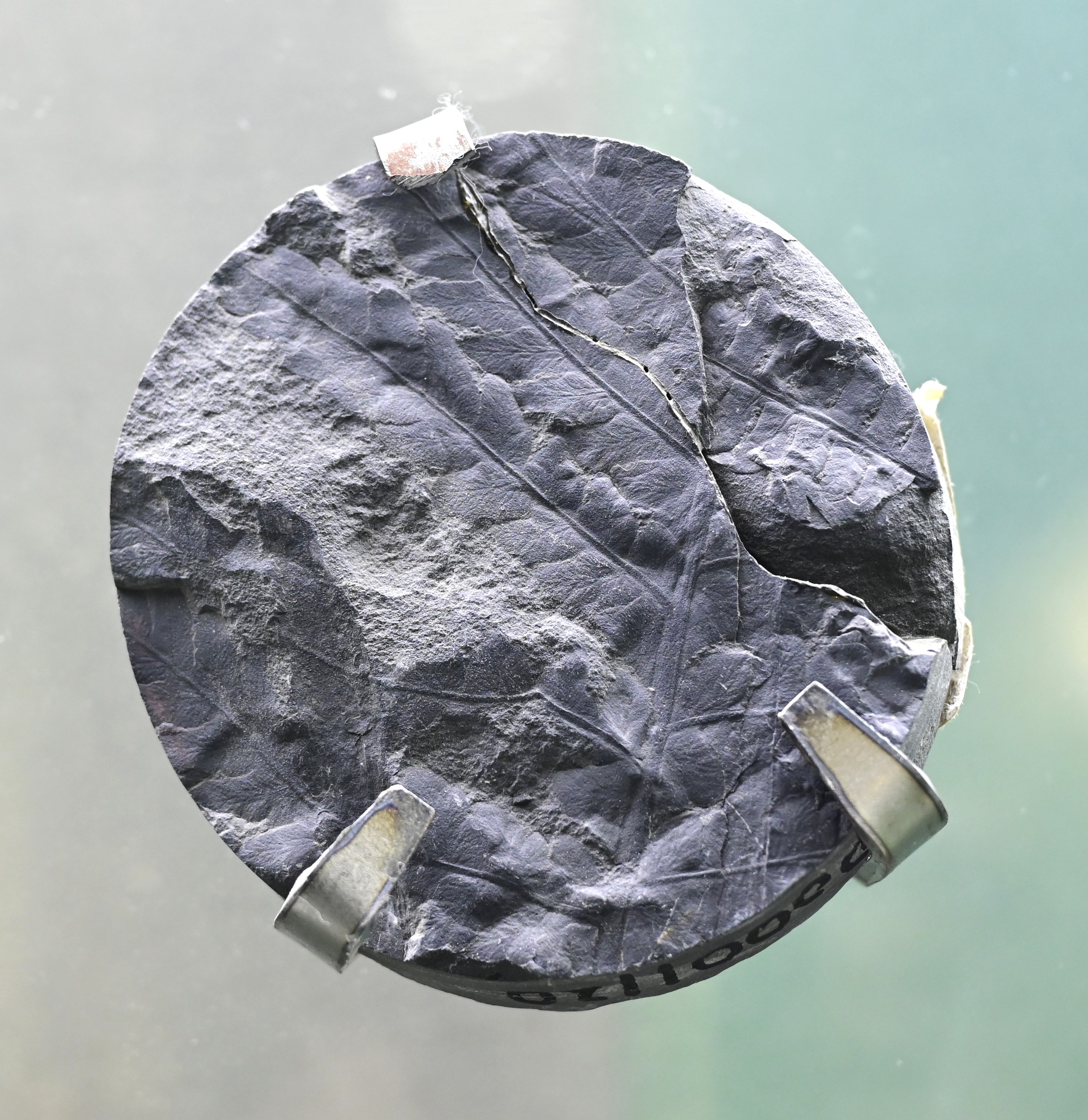
- Emplectopteris, National Natural History Museum of China

Scientific classification
- Kingdom: Plantae
- Clade: Embryophytes
- Clade: Tracheophytes
- Division: †Pteridospermatophyta
- Class: †Lyginopteridopsida (?)
- Order: †Callistophytales
- Family: †Emplectopteridaceae; Wagner, 1967

= Emplectopteridaceae =

Emplectopteridaceae Temporal range: Artinskian–Wuchiapingian

Extinct family of Permian plants

Emplectopteridaceae is an extinct family of pteridosperms ("seed ferns") known mainly from Permian floras of the Cathaysian Realm (corresponding to modern East Asia). They were mostly shrubby plants with a scrambling or upright habit, and favoured a range of habitats from arid to moist or even aquatic.

The foliage is the most abundant known remains of this family, having been reported from Artinskian to Wuchiapingian macrofloras of both north and south China. Their venation is characteristically flexuous to loosely anastomosed, and rather different from the more regularly anastomosed venation of the true gigantopterids (with which the Emplctopteridaceae fronds used to be confused). The stratigraphically older leaves tended to be twice pinnate (Emplectopteris), the later leaves once pinnate or entire (Gigantonoclea).

The ovules were bilaterally symmetrical and attached to the underside of the leaves / fronds that did not differ significantly from normal vegetative foliage Pollen organs were a complex of filiform microsporophylls each bearing 2-8 sporangia (assigned to the fossil-genus Jiaochengia).

The family is currently only known from adpressions (compression-impressions), and the consequential paucity of anatomical evidence has resulted in some disagreement as to its affinities. However, the form and position of attachment of the ovules strongly suggests affinities with the callistophytaleans. Emplectopterids have only reliably been reported from China. Gigantonoclea-like leaves have also been reported from Permian macrofloras of North America, but without any evidence of reproductive structures, and the affinity of these leaves may lie nearer to the Peltaspermales.

== List of genera ==
- Emplectopteris leaves
- Gigantonoclea leaves
- Cornucarpus ovulate organ
- Jiaochengia pollen organ
