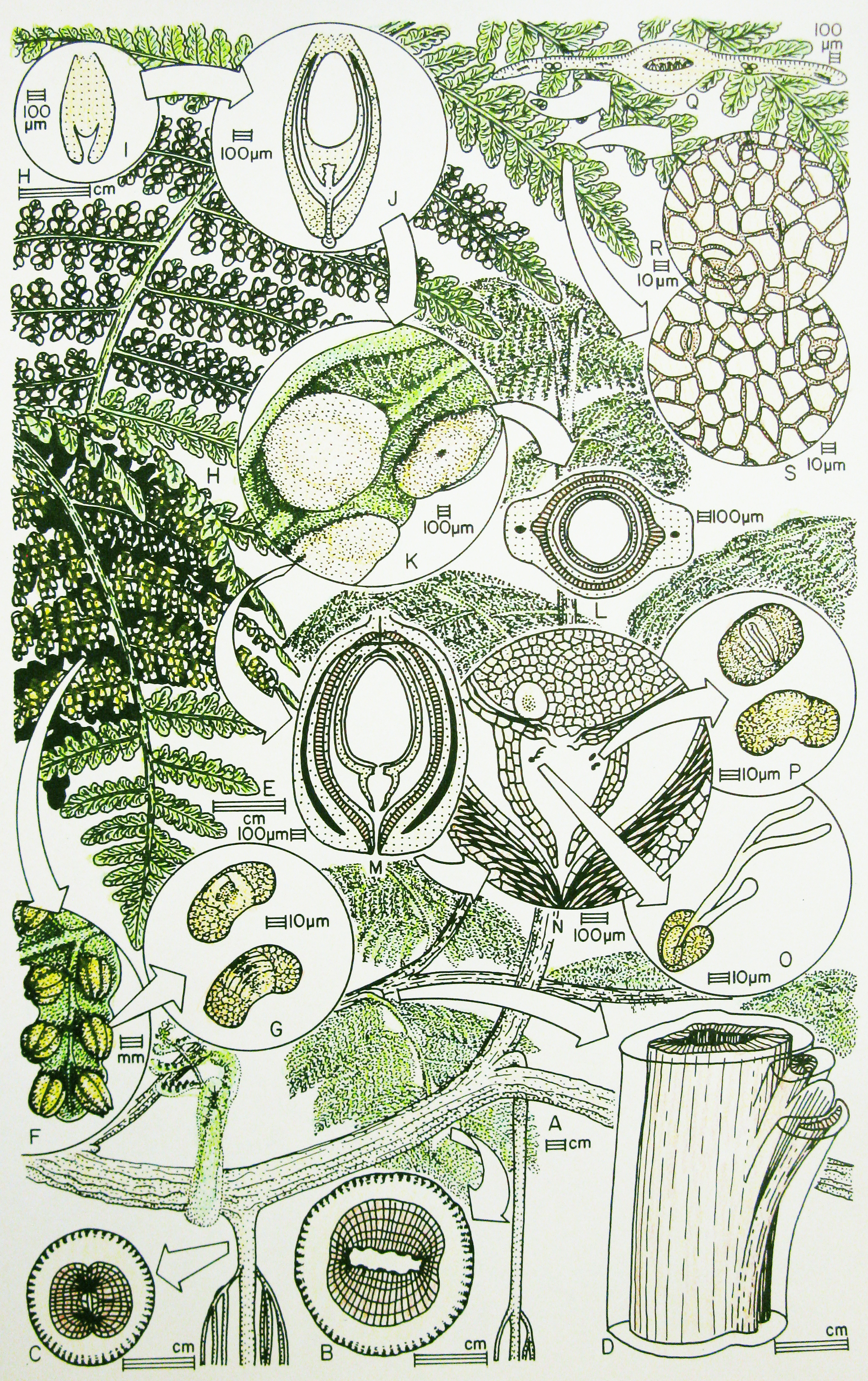
- Reconstruction of the plant Callospermarion pusillum (permineralized ovules), Idanothekion callistophytoides (pollen organ), Dicksonites pluckenetii (leaves), Callistophyton poroxyloides (stem), and Vesicaspora shaubergeri (pollen) from the Pennsylvanian Calhoun Formation of Berryville, Illinois.

Scientific classification
- Kingdom: Plantae
- Clade: Tracheophytes
- Division: †Pteridospermatophyta
- Class: †Lyginopteridopsida (?)
- Order: †Callistophytales
- Family: †Callistophytaceae

Genera
- Callospermarion ovule; Idanothekion pollen organ; Dicksonites leaves; Mariopteris leaves; Callistophyton permineralized wood; Vesicaspora pollen

= Callistophytaceae =

Callistophytaceae Temporal range: Moscovian–Artinskian

Extinct family of seed ferns

The Callistophytaceae was a family of seed ferns (pteridosperms) from the Carboniferous and Permian periods. They first appeared in late Middle Pennsylvanian (Moscovian) times, 306.5–311.7 million years ago (Ma) in the tropical coal forests of Euramerica, and became an important component of Late Pennsylvanian (Kasimovian-Gzhelian; 299.0–306.5 Ma) vegetation of clastic soils and some peat soils. The best known callistophyte was documented from Late Pennsylvanian coal ball petrifactions in North America.

== Description ==
=== Stems ===
The relatively slender stems (fossil genus Callistophyton) had a eustele with a well-developed zone of secondary wood, and unlike most (but not all) other Palaeozoic pteridosperms, showed axillary branching. These characters strongly point to its having been a scrambling or climbing plant. A characteristic feature of the stems is the presence in the cortex of spherical secretory structures. Similar structures have also been found in associated ovules, pollen-organs and foliage, and were one of the main lines of evidence on which the reconstruction of the plant was based (compare with similar evidence used to reconstruct the Lyginopteris-bearing fossil plant).

=== Ovules ===
The small ovules (fossil genus Callospermarion) with the characteristic secretory structures have an integument that was only fused to the nucellus in the basal part of the ovules and so superficially resemble medullosalean ovules. Unlike the Medullosales, the ovules appear to be bilaterally symmetrical, although details of the vasculature suggest they were in fact evolved from plants with radially symmetrical ovules. The apical part of the nucellus has a lagenostome-like projection, which breaks down to form the pollen chamber. The full ontogeny of these ovules has been worked out in some detail and seems to be essentially similar to that seen in modern-day gymnosperms, including the use of a pollen drop to help capture and draw the pollen into the pollen chamber and a pollen tube to deliver the generative nucleus. The ovules were borne on the underside of pinnules that did not differ significantly in form from those of the purely vegetative fronds.

=== Synangia ===
The pollen-producing organs (fossil genus Idanothekion) consisted of small, radially symmetrical synangia, with each pollen-sac having a longitudinal dehisence structure. Like the ovules, the synangia were attached to the underside of pinnules that did not differ significantly in form from those of the purely vegetative fronds, and so can give a superficially similarity to fertile fern fronds. Unlike ferns, however, these pollen-organs produced monolete, bisaccate pollen (fossil genus Vesicaspora) bearing some similarity to the pollen of many conifers.

=== Foliage ===
The foliage, which is the part of these plants most widely-found as macrofossils, consists of fronds with a basal dichotomy of the main rachis, each branch producing pinnately divided segments, but with no pinnae attached below the dichotomy. Such fronds, when found as adpressions, are known as Dicksonites. The pinnules tend to be tongue-shaped or somewhat lobed, and can closely resemble pinnules of Lyginopteridales fronds such as Mariopteris. Distinguishing the fronds of these two orders of pteridosperms can in fact be very difficult unless the pinnules are fertile, although generally the pinnule lamina of Dicksonites fronds tend to be somewhat vaulted, whereas Mariopteris pinnules are usually flatter.

== Distribution ==
Occasional Vesicaspora pollen grains and fragments of Dicksonites-like fronds occur in early Moscovian (middle Westphalian) strata, especially in intra-montane basins. However, callistophyte foliage and pollen suddenly become relatively widespread and abundant in Euramerican floras in late Moscovian (late Asturian) floras. This increase in callistophyte abundance is one of the indexes to the base of what is called the Dicksonites plueckenetii Subzone, which marks a significant phase in the continent-wide changes to the wetland ("coal swamp") vegetation that took place in late Moscovian times in response to a combination of tectonics-induced landscape changes and climate change. The increase in abundance of the callistophytes coincided with a decline in abundance and diversity of the Lyginopteridales, which occupied very similar ecological niches and were very similar in general habit. It seems possible, therefore, that the reproductively more sophisticated callistophytes were able to out-compete and replace the Lyginopteridales.

The Callistophytaceae flourished in Euramerica through Late Pennsylvanian times, eventually becoming extinct as this part of Pangaea became arid at the start of Permian times. They extend through the Permian of China and include anatomically preserved ovules of Callospermarion, vegetative foliage of Emplecopteris triagularis, male organs of Norinotheca and ovulate fronds of Norinosperma, and stems of Calistophyton. Callistophytales appear to be victims of the Permo-Triassic extinction event in 'Cathaysia'.
