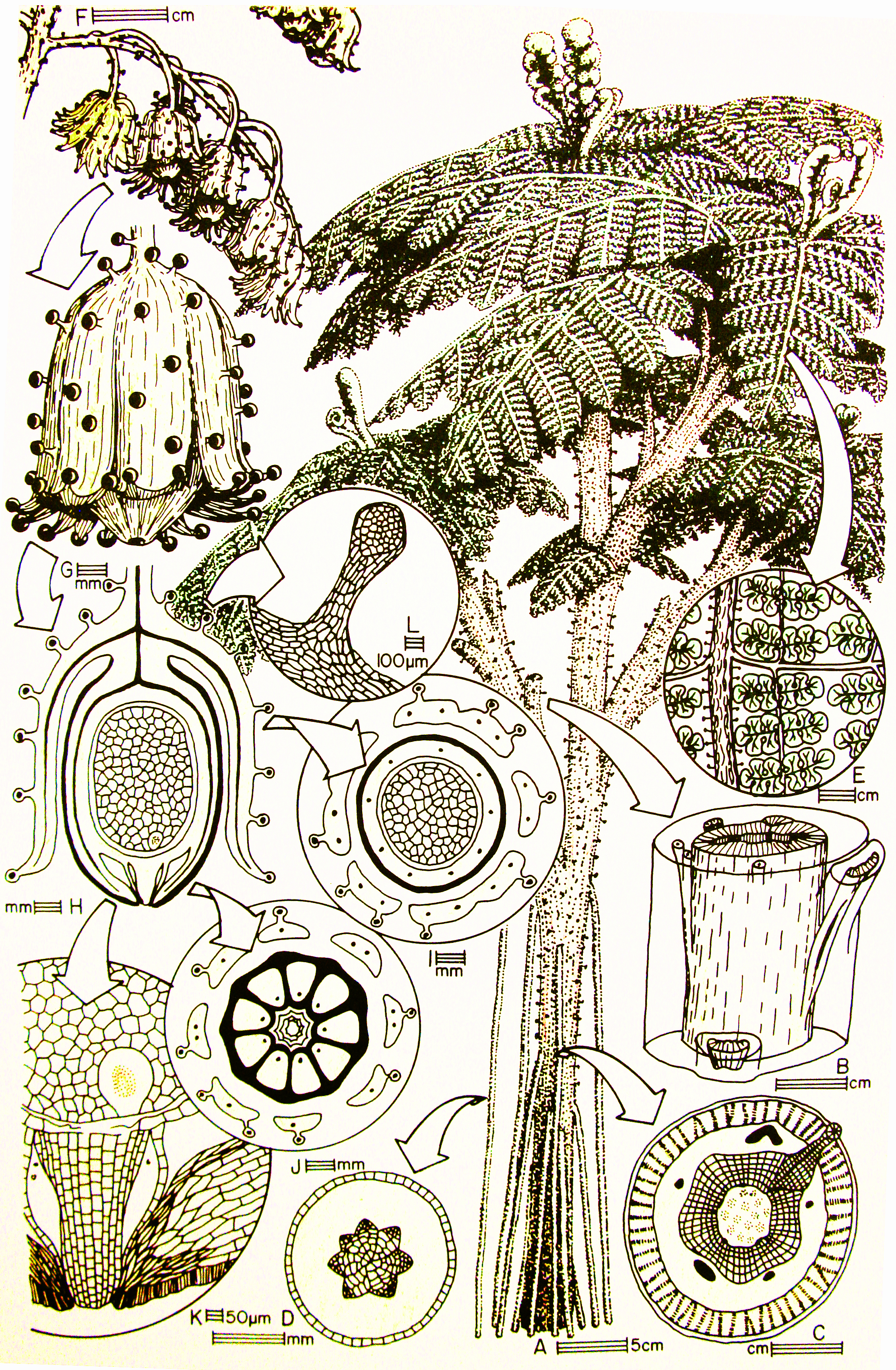
- Reconstructed plant with Lagenostoma lomaxii ovules, Lyginopteris oldhamiana permineralized stem and Sphenopteris hoeningshausenii leaves

Scientific classification
- Kingdom: Plantae
- Clade: Tracheophytes
- Division: †Pteridospermatophyta
- Class: †Lyginopteridopsida
- Order: †Lyginopteridales
- Family: †Lyginopteridaceae
- Genus: †Lagenostoma; Williamson 1877

Species
- Lagenostoma lomaxii; Lagenostoma physoides; Lagenostoma ovoides

= Lagenostoma =

Lagenostoma Temporal range: Late Carboniferous

Extinct genus of seed ferns

Lagenostoma is a genus of seed ferns (Pteridospermatophyta), based on ovules preserved in coal balls from the Six Inch Coal of the Hough Hill Colliery near Stalybridge, England. Distinctive stalked glands enabled Oliver and Scott to attribute these seeds to fernlike foliage of Sphenopteris hoeningshauseni in the same coal balls. This was the first recognition that some Carboniferous fernlike leaves had seeds, and so were not pteridophytes, but rather Pteridospermatophyta, or seed ferns. The realization that seed plants as well as spore plants had fernlike leaves was a major contribution to the evolutionary history of plants.

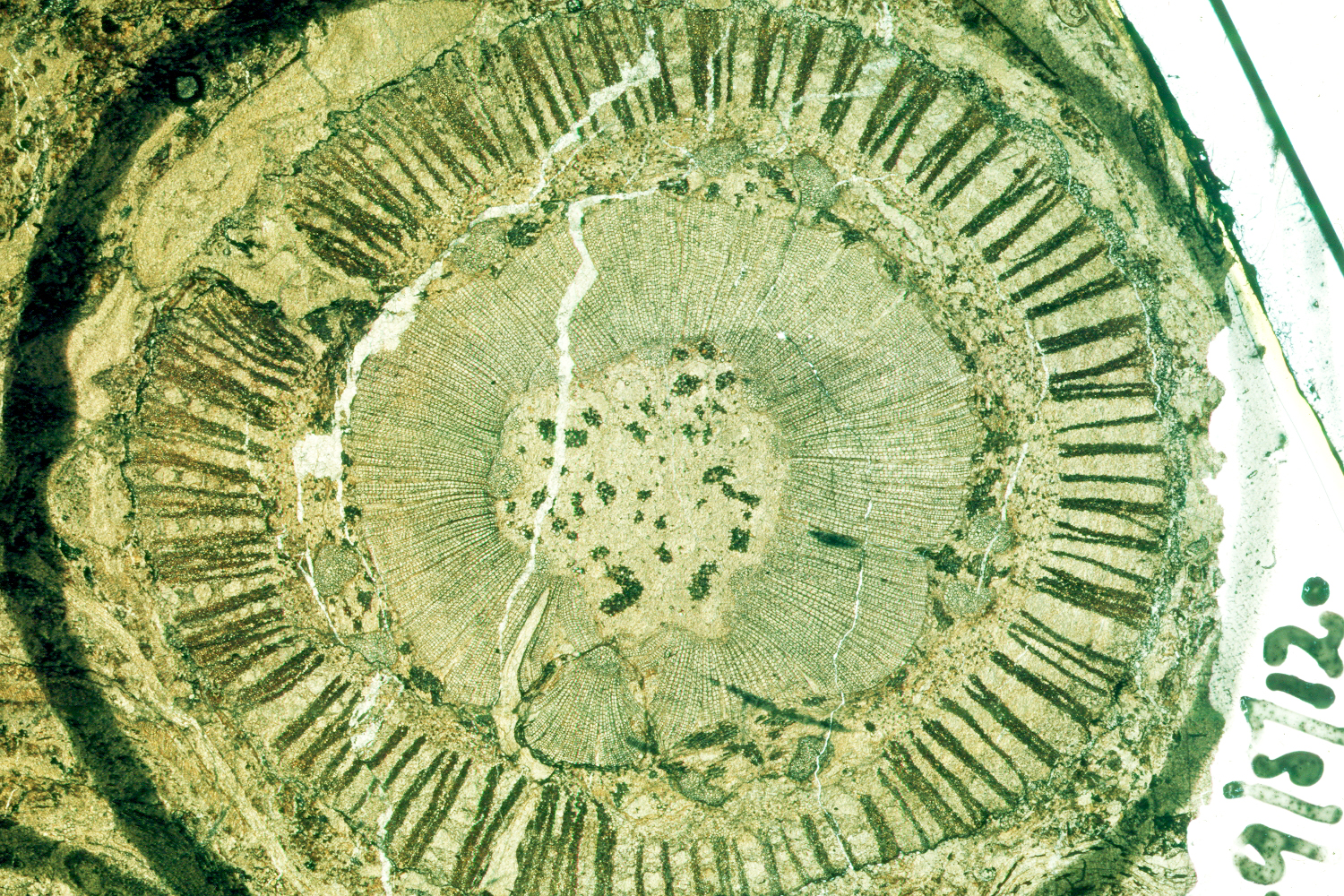
Cross section of permineralized Lyginopteris oldhamiana from the Late Carboniferous Six Inch Coal upper Millstone Grit near Stalybridge, England

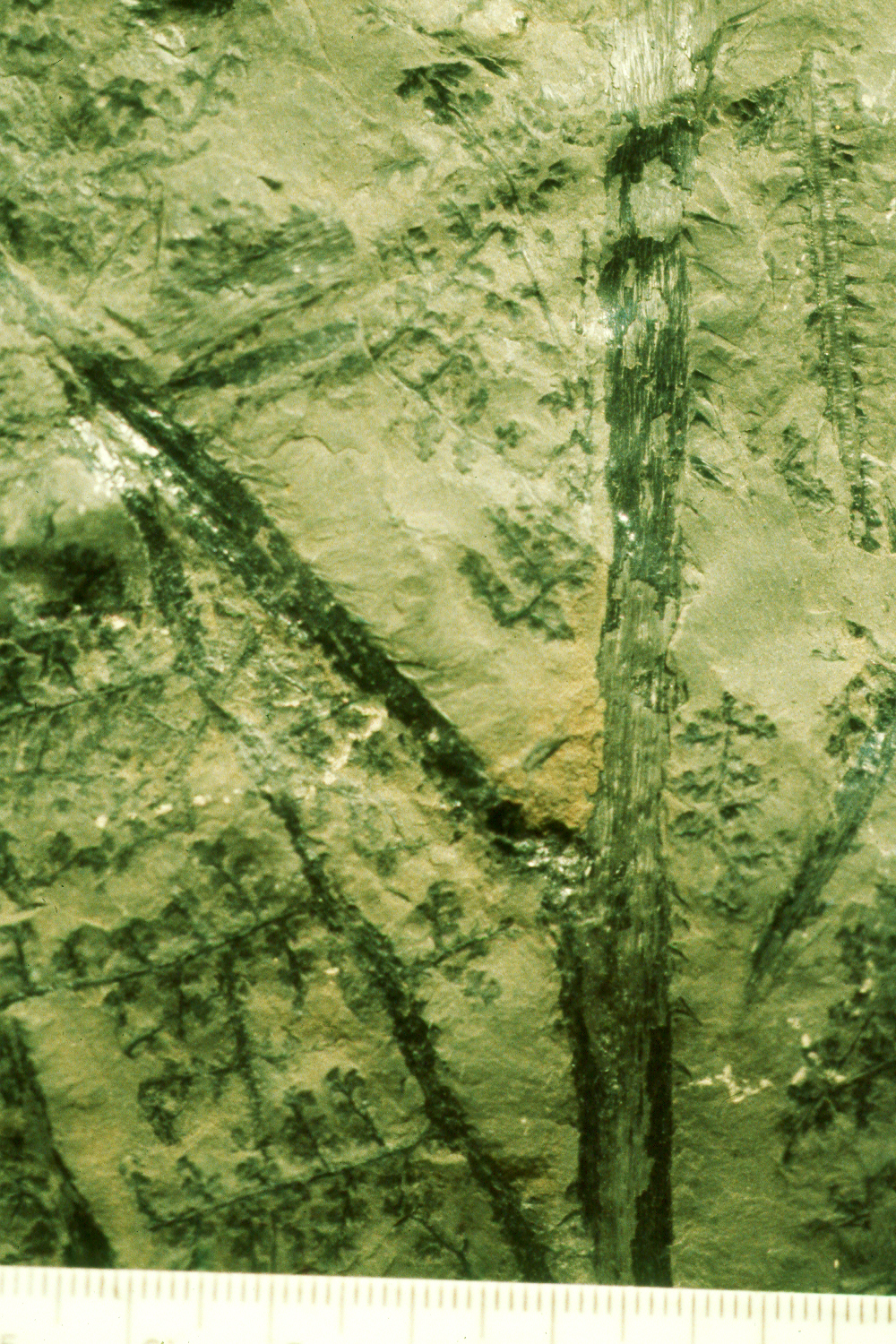
Leaf of Sphenopteris hoeningshauseni from the Late Mississippian Subconglomerate Coal of Dade County, Georgia, USA

== Description ==
Lagenostoma has large (7–8 mm) ovules arranged in branching structures. The genus name comes from the distinctive prepollen receiving structure of a cone blocked by a growing plug of tissue.

== Whole plant associations ==
- Lagenostoma lomaxii from the Late Carboniferous Six Inch Coal of the upper Millstone grit near Stalybridge UK, has distinctive stalked glands linking it with stems of Lyginopteris oldhamiana and Sphenopteris hoeninghausenii.
