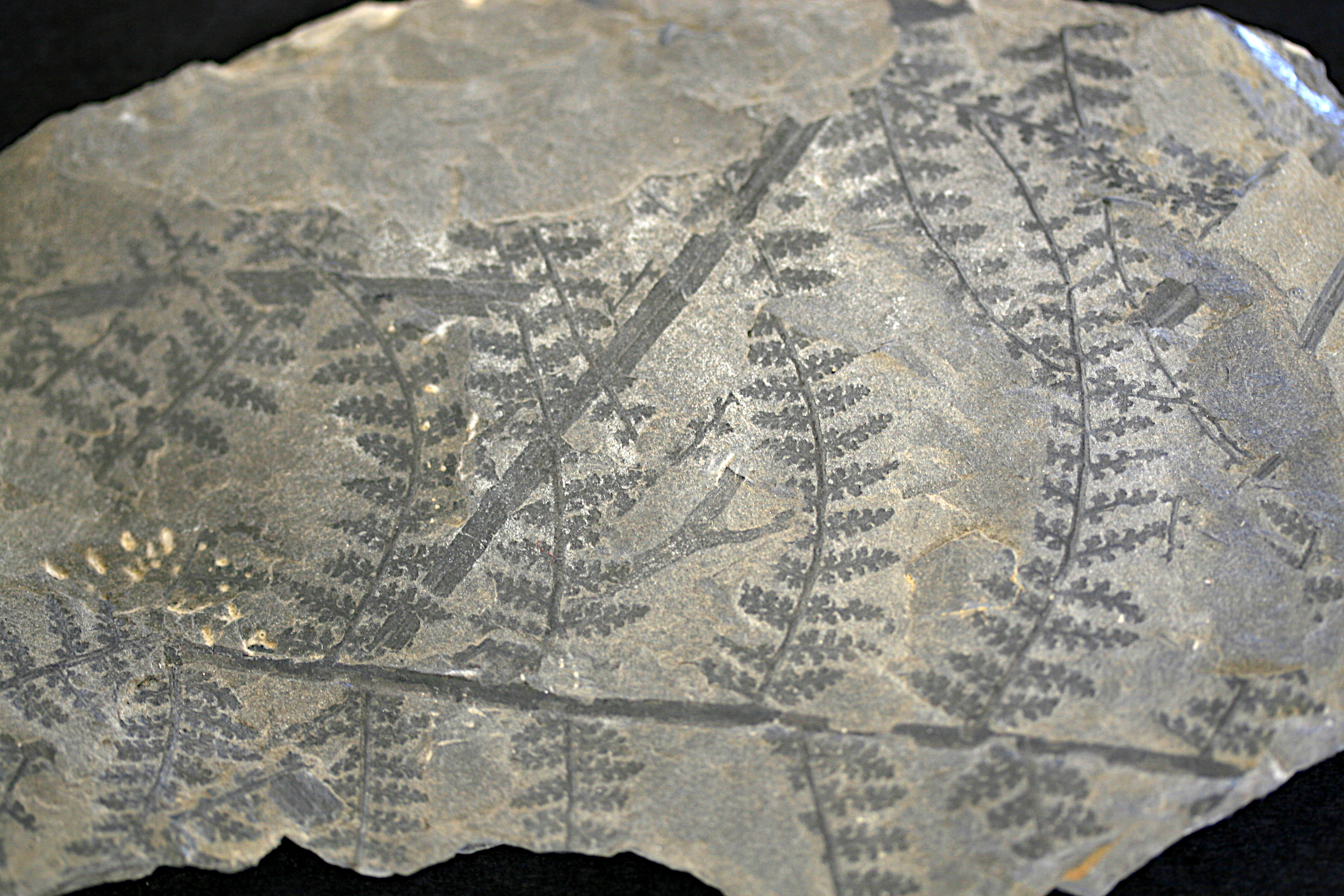
- Sphenopteris specimen found in Carboniferous rocks in Loire-Atlantique department, France

Scientific classification
- Kingdom: Plantae
- Clade: Tracheophytes
- Division: †Pteridospermatophyta
- Class: †Lyginopteridopsida
- Order: †Lyginopteridales
- Family: †Lyginopteridaceae
- Genus: †Sphenopteris; Sternberg 1825

Species
- S. alata †; S. elegans †; S. fragilis †; S. obtusiloba †; S. pinnae †; S. plicata †; S. pottsvillea †; S. sanjuliensis †; S. spiniformis †; S. suessi †; S. trifoliata †; S. valentinii †; S. warragulensis †

Synonyms
- Synonyms of S. elegans; Sphenopteris adiantoides

= Sphenopteris =

Sphenopteris Temporal range: Late Devonian-Cretaceous ~388–70 Ma

Genus of plants (fossil)

Sphenopteris is a genus of seed ferns containing the foliage of various extinct plants, ranging from the Devonian to Late Cretaceous. One species, S. höninghausi, was transferred to the genus Crossotheca in 1911.

== Biology ==
The frond of Sphenopteris could be up to 20 inches (51 cm) long.

== Distribution ==
In Brazil, fossil of form genus Sphenopteris was located in outcrop Morro Papalé in the city of Mariana Pimentel. They are in the geopark Paleorrota in Rio Bonito Formation and date from Sakmarian in Permian. Fossils of Sphenopteris have also been found in the Valle Alto Formation, Caldas, Colombia, among many other locations.

Three species, S. gruenbachiana, S. ungeri and S. heterophylla are known from the Campanian aged Grünbach Formation of Austria.
