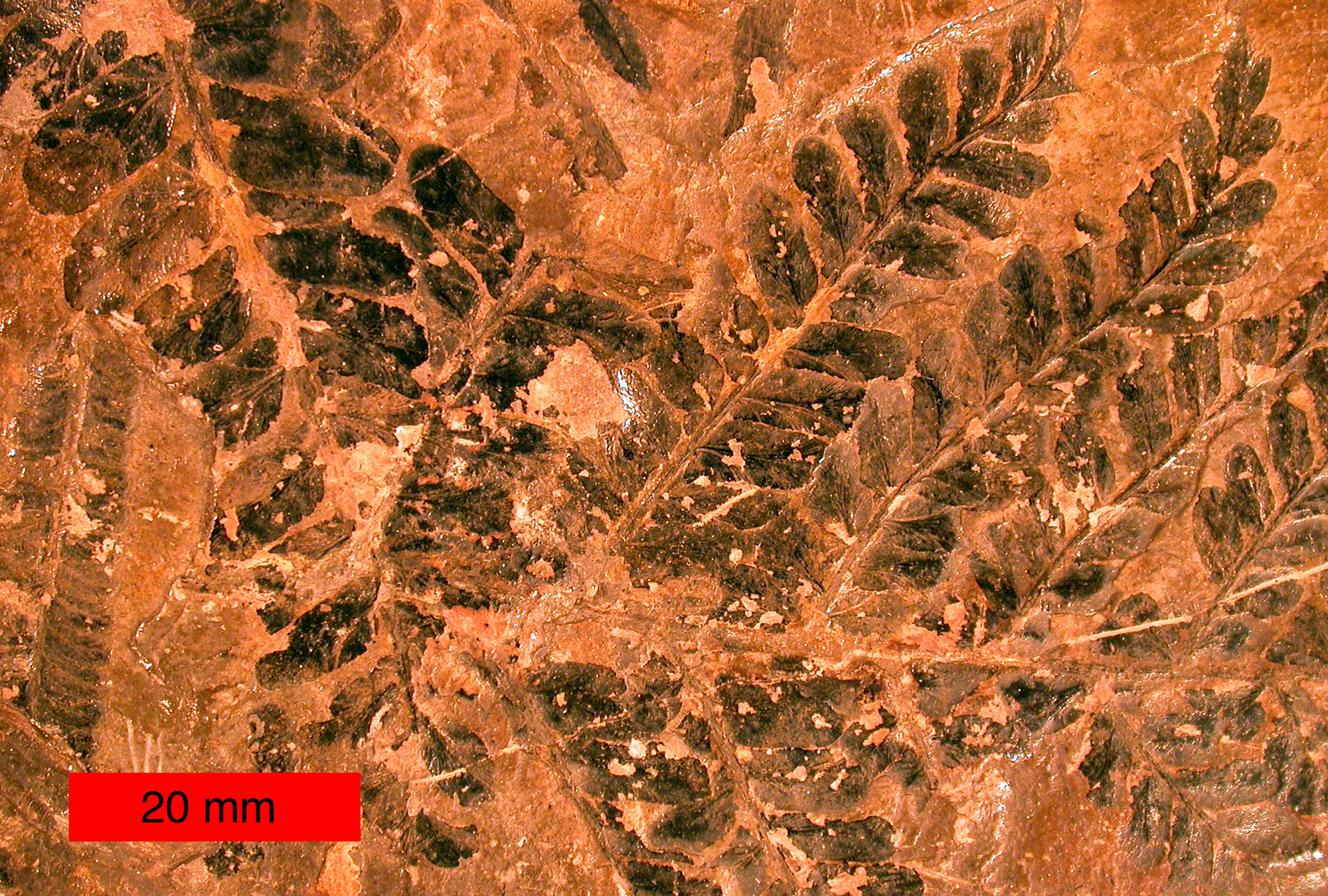
- Neuropteris ovata, from northeastern Ohio.

Scientific classification
- Kingdom: Plantae
- Clade: Tracheophytes
- Division: †Pteridospermatophyta
- Order: †Calamopityales; Němejc, 1963
- Family: †Calamopityaceae; Solms, 1896

Synonyms
- Calamopityaea Scott, 1909; Stenomyeleae Scott, 1923

= Calamopityaceae =

Calamopityaceae Temporal range: Early Carboniferous

Extinct family of Paleozoic plants

Calamopityaceae is the largest family of the division of extinct seed-bearing plants (spermatophytes) known as Pteridospermatophyta. It is the only family in the monotypic order Calamopityales. This family is characterized by its petioles and specific wood pattern, and it grew only in the Paleozoic era, specifically in North America and Europe. Three form genera within the family are diagnosed by their stem structure: Calamopitys, Stenomyelon, and Diichinia. It was named by Solms-Laubach in 1896. Since then, its genera have been added to and grouped differently.

== Morphology ==
Calamopityaceae is the largest family in Pteriodspermatophyta. This family is composed of gymnosperms, and because of their stem structure discovered through fossil rocks, they are considered to be in this division. However, nothing is known of their reproductive organs, but they are classified as seed plants based on their similarities to the Lyginopteridaceae and Medullasaceae families within Pteriodspermatophyta. Calamopityaceae resemble Lyginopteridaceae and Medullasaceae in the monoxylic wood structures in their stem; this structure suggests the stem (diameter less than 1.5 cm) was narrow during the Calamopityaceae plant lifetime. Only some petiole tissue has been found; it is classified to be of the genus Kalymma and suggests the plant had large fronds. To identify a genus within this family, this petiole structure and monoxylic wood must be present, as well as a much larger cortex than vascular cylinder. No fossil evidence has been found to describe on their seed and pollen (reproductive) organs, and therefore the species within this family show more variance than other families.

Gymnosperms, including those that are extinct, can be classified by their wood: monoxylic vs pycnoxylic. Monoxylic wood is soft and spongy and has a large pith and cortex. Pycnoxylic wood, which is more dense with less pith and cortex, is more commercially used. The three genera of Calamopityaceae, Calamopitys, Stenomyelon, and Diichnia, show monoxylic wood stem patterns, and this is considered to be an essential classification of the family Calamopityaceae (hence why Bilignea, Eristophyton, Endoxylon, and Shenoxylon were removed from this family).

== Origins ==
Calamopityaceae fossils have been found in North America and Europe, and they have been dated back to the Paleozoic era, specifically the Upper Devonian and Lower Carboniferous (Mississippian) periods. Being from this early period, Calamopityaceae are significant as an example of some of the earliest seed plants and ancestors of angiosperms.

=== Examples of specific varieties and discoveries ===
- Stenomyelon tuedianum: Calciferous Sandstone Series of Britain, 1912
- Diichnia kentuckiensis and Diichnia readii: New Albany Shale of Kentucky, 1937
- Calamopitys embergeri: Mid-Tournaisian of France, 1970
- Calamopitys americana: America, 1914

== History ==
In 1856, the Austrian paleontologist, Franz Joseph Andreas Nicolaus Unger, was the first to find Calamopitys, a genus of Calamopityaceae. This genus, which later was the root for the family name, was found in the Thuringian Forest. Forty years later, the family was named Calamopityaceae by Solms-Laubach.

Though the original genera, Calamopitys, Stenomyelon, and Diichnia, still remain under this family classification, there have been historical additions to these groupings. Because the family is defined loosely on stem structure with nothing known about the foliage and reproductive structure, different genera have been added and removed from this family. Four more genera, Bilignea, Eristophyton, Endoxylon, and Sphenoxylon, were added to the family in 1936. These genera were classified by their pycnoxylic secondary wood pattern. In 1953, they were removed from the family with the intention of keeping the family composed of genera with monoxylic secondary wood.

Like many "seed ferns", the affinities of the Calamopityales are unclear. Meyen (1984) placed them within the class Ginkgoopsida, which also includes ginkgos. Apart from Calamopitys and Stenomyelon, he also placed the genera Lyrasperma, Deltasperma, Eosperma, and Kalymma within Calamopityaceae.

A classification scheme by Doweld (2001) considered Calamopityales to be an incertae sedis order within the phylum "Moresnetiophyta". Doweld also listed Buteoxylaceae Barnard & Long 1973 as a synonym of Calamopityaceae, implying that its constituent fossil wood genera (Buteoxylon and Triradioxylon) should be referred to Calamopityaceae. This would additionally require treating the order Buteoxylonales as a synonym of Calamopityales. Stenomyelon has been compared favorably to Buteoxylon in more recent studies as well.

== Genera ==
Three genera of fossil wood are currently classified as belonging to the family Calamopityaceae, and their differences are distinguished by their decreasing primary xylem from Stenomyelon, to Calamopitys, to Diichnia. Additionally, Galtiera, Triichnia, and Bostonia are classified within the family by some authors, and Faironia and Chapelia may also have affinities with the family.

=== Calamopitys ===
Type species - Calamopitys saturnii

There are six species within this genus, and it has the most species of any Calamopityaceae genera. Although Eristophyton is sometimes considered to be a subgenus under this genus, the distinction between pycnoxylic and monoxylic secondary wood maintains these genera as separate. In terms of structure, these plants under this genera have narrow stems with diameter 2–3 cm (or larger in C. embergeri and C. schweitzeri).

=== Stenomyelon ===
Type species - Stenomyelon tuedianum

Originally known as "Tweed Mill fossil", this genus consists of fewer species than Calamopitys, but in addition to S. tuedianum, species include S. primaevum, S. heterangioides, and S. muratum.

=== Diichnia ===
Type species - Diichnia kentuckiensis

Species of this genus are classified based on the characteristics of the smallest primary xylem of Calamopityaceae and a five-angled pith, as seen in the stem cross-section. These characteristics separate this genus from the other genera.

=== Other form genera ===
Non-wood form genera referred to Calamopityaceae include:

- Dolichosperma (ovulate organ)
- Eurystoma (ovulate organ)
- Lyrasperma (ovulate organ)
- Kalymma (foliage)
- Sphenopteridium (foliage)
