= Pitys =

Pitys may refer to:

- Pitys (mythology), a nymph
- Pitys, a genus of land snail; see Sinployea decorticata
- Pitys, a synonym of Pitus, a Carboniferous "seed fern/pteridosperm" tree
