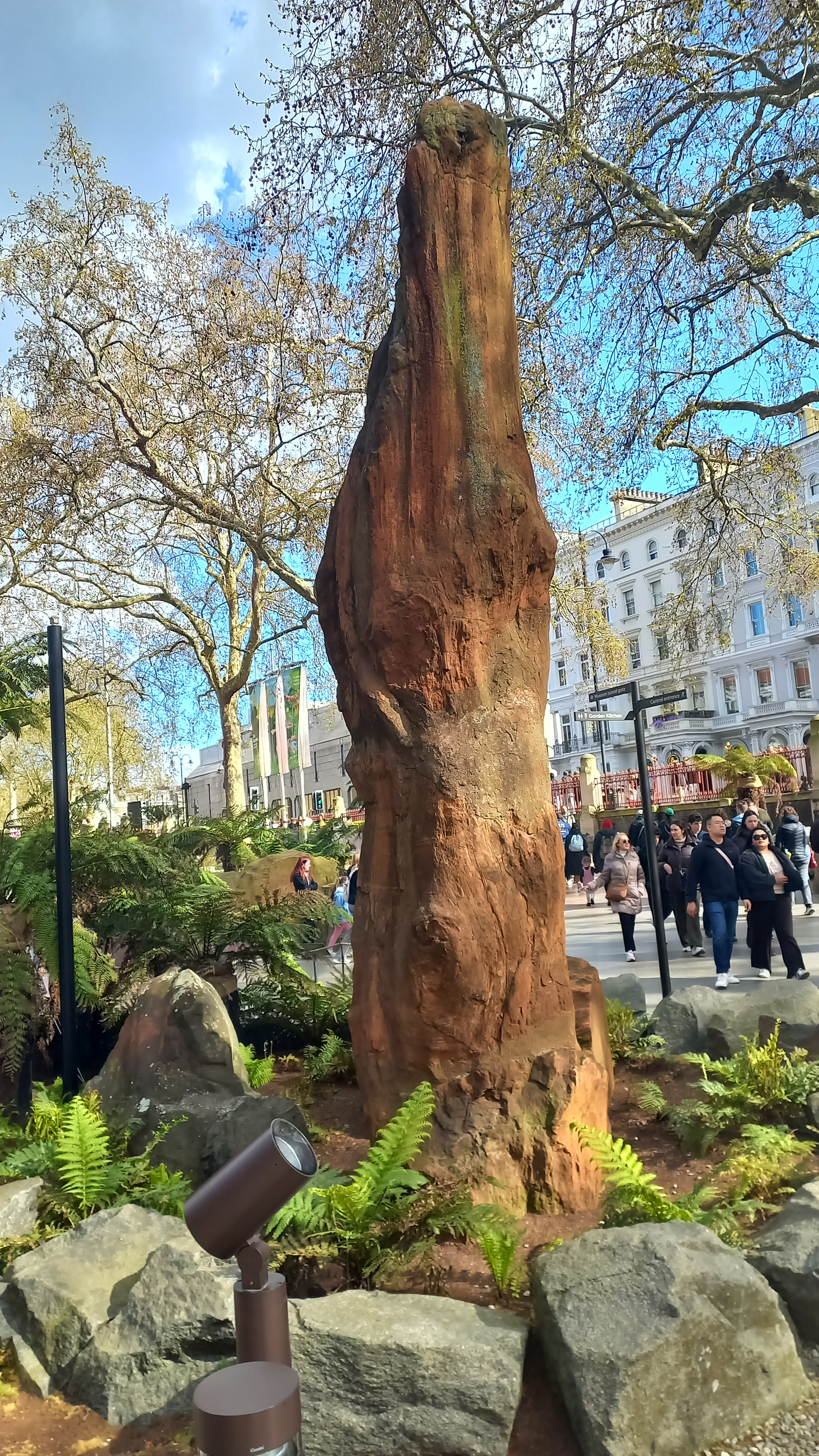
- Pitus withamii fossil outside Natural History Museum, London

Scientific classification
- Kingdom: Plantae
- Clade: Embryophytes
- Clade: Tracheophytes
- Clade: Spermatophytes
- Division: †Pteridospermatophyta
- Genus: †Pitus; Witham

Species
- Pitus primaeva Witham; Pitus antiqua Witham; Pitus withamii (Lindley and Hutton) Arnold

= Pitus =

Pitus Temporal range: Mississippian

Extinct genus of plants

Pitus, also known as Pitys, is an extinct genus of early "pteridosperm" (also known as "seed fern") seed plant (gymnosperm sensu lato). A morphogenus representing wood, they are primarily known from remains found in Euramerica (also known as Laurussia) during the Early Carboniferous (Mississippian), including Newfoundland and Scotland. They are particularly well known from fossils found in southern Scotland of Viséan age (with the species P. withamii having the colloquial name of the Craigleith tree) when the area had a tropical climate. Their trunks reached at least 20 metres (66 ft) in height and 1 metre (3 ft 3 in) wide at the base, and were the tallest trees at the time. They are associated with rachis of Lyginorachis, and the leaves of Sphenopteris. They are considered to be part of the "hydrasperman" group of seed ferns (which is likely paraphyletic). A distant relationship with modern cycads has been proposed. Attribution of remains from Australia to the genus has been questioned.
