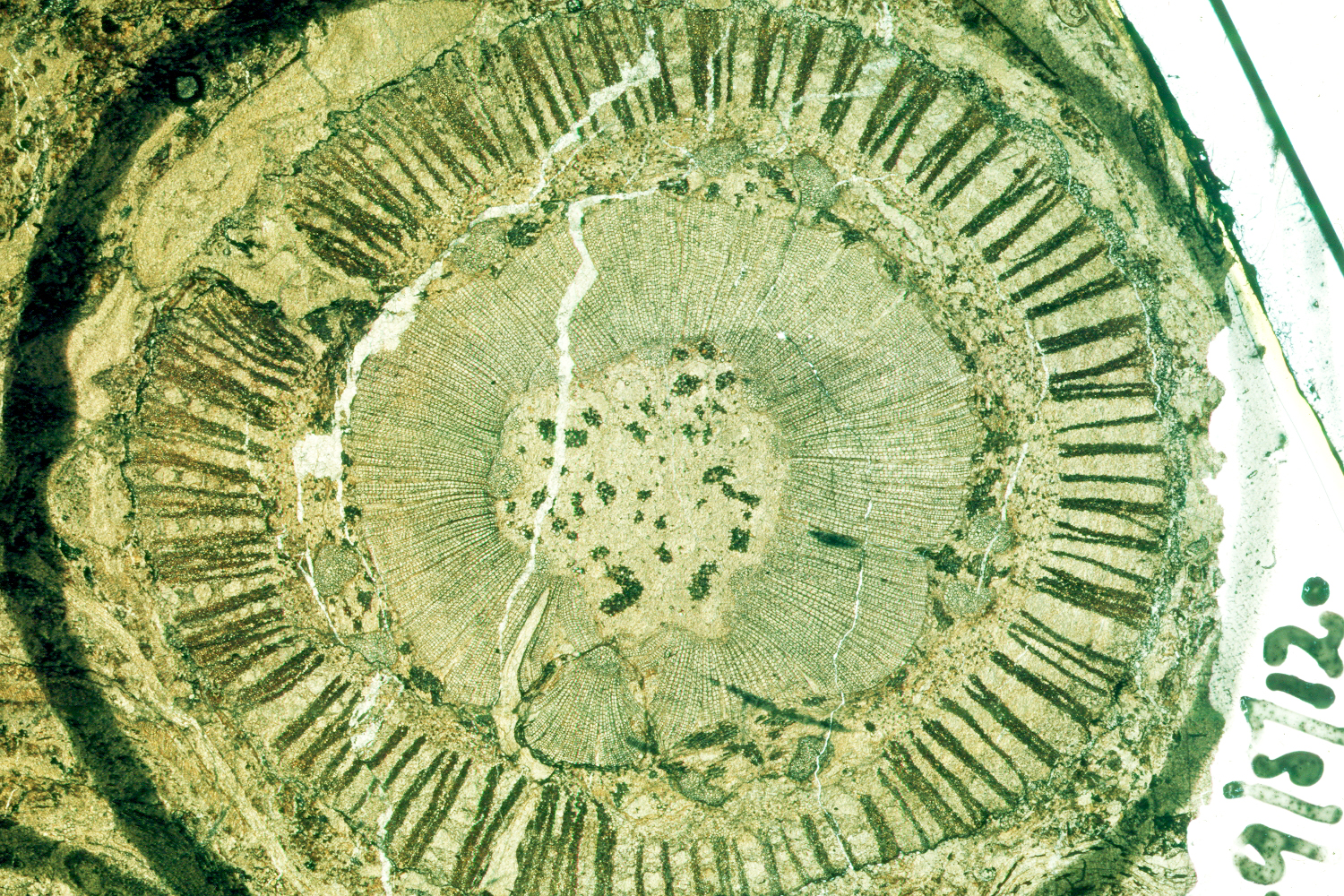
- Permineralized stem Lyginopteris oldhamiana from coal ball of Late Carboniferous Six Inch Coal in Hough Hill Colliery near Stalybridge, England

Scientific classification
- Kingdom: Plantae
- Clade: Tracheophytes
- Division: †Pteridospermatophyta
- Class: †Lyginopteridopsida
- Order: †Lyginopteridales
- Family: †Lyginopteridaceae
- Genus: †Lyginopteris (Binney) Potonie 1899

Species
- Lyginopteris austriaca; Lyginopteris heterangeoides; Lyginopteris lacunosa; Lyginopteris oldhamiana; Lyginopteris royalii

= Lyginopteris =

Lyginopteris Temporal range: Late Carboniferous

Extinct genus of Late Carboniferous seed ferns

Lyginopteris is a genus of Late Carboniferous seed fern stems with a very distinctive outer cortex of sclereids forming a pattern in cross section like Roman numerals on a clock face, often called a Sparganum cortex. Some Lyginopteris were parasitized by water molds, such as the Combresomyces.
