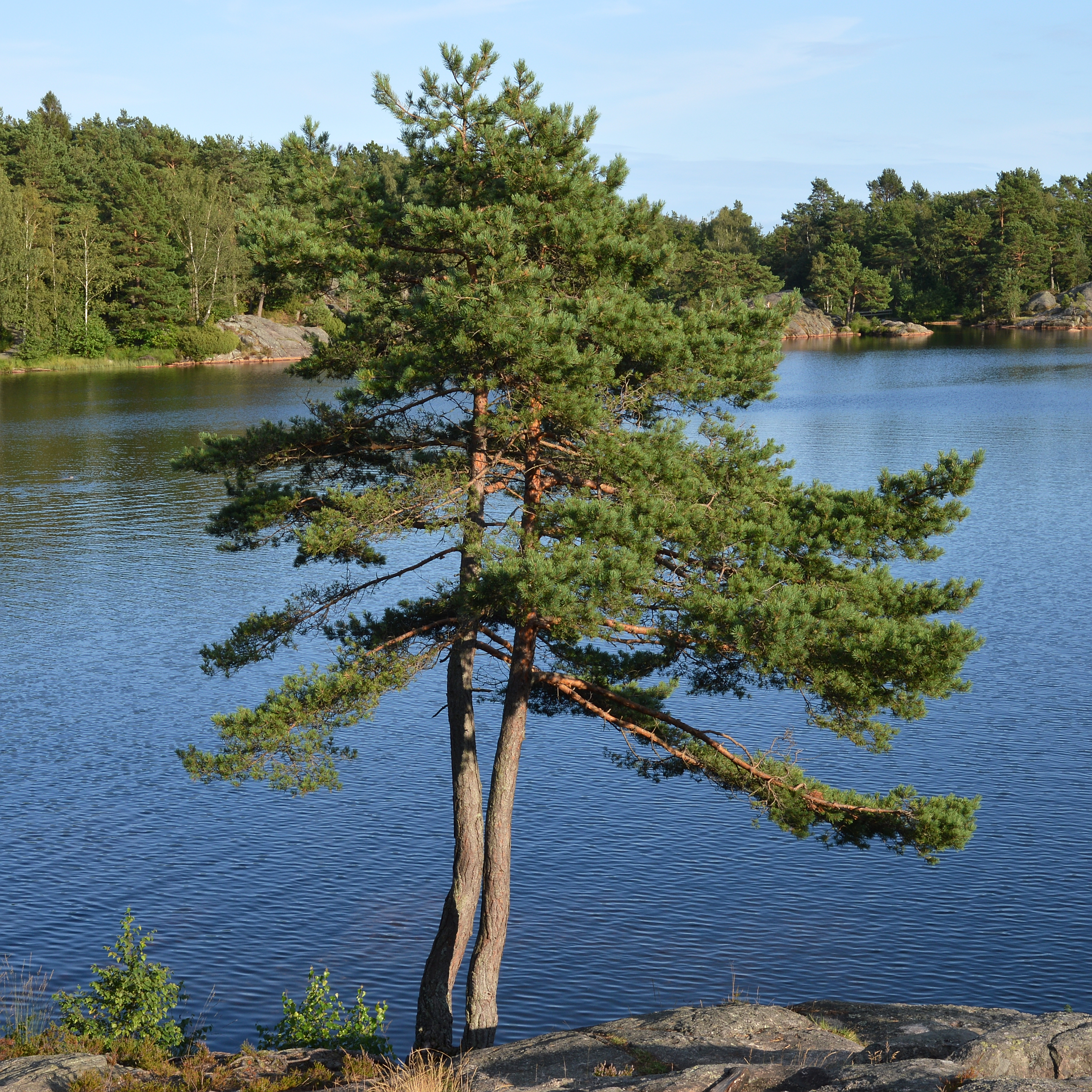
- Scots pine, Pinus sylvestris, a member of the Pinophyta
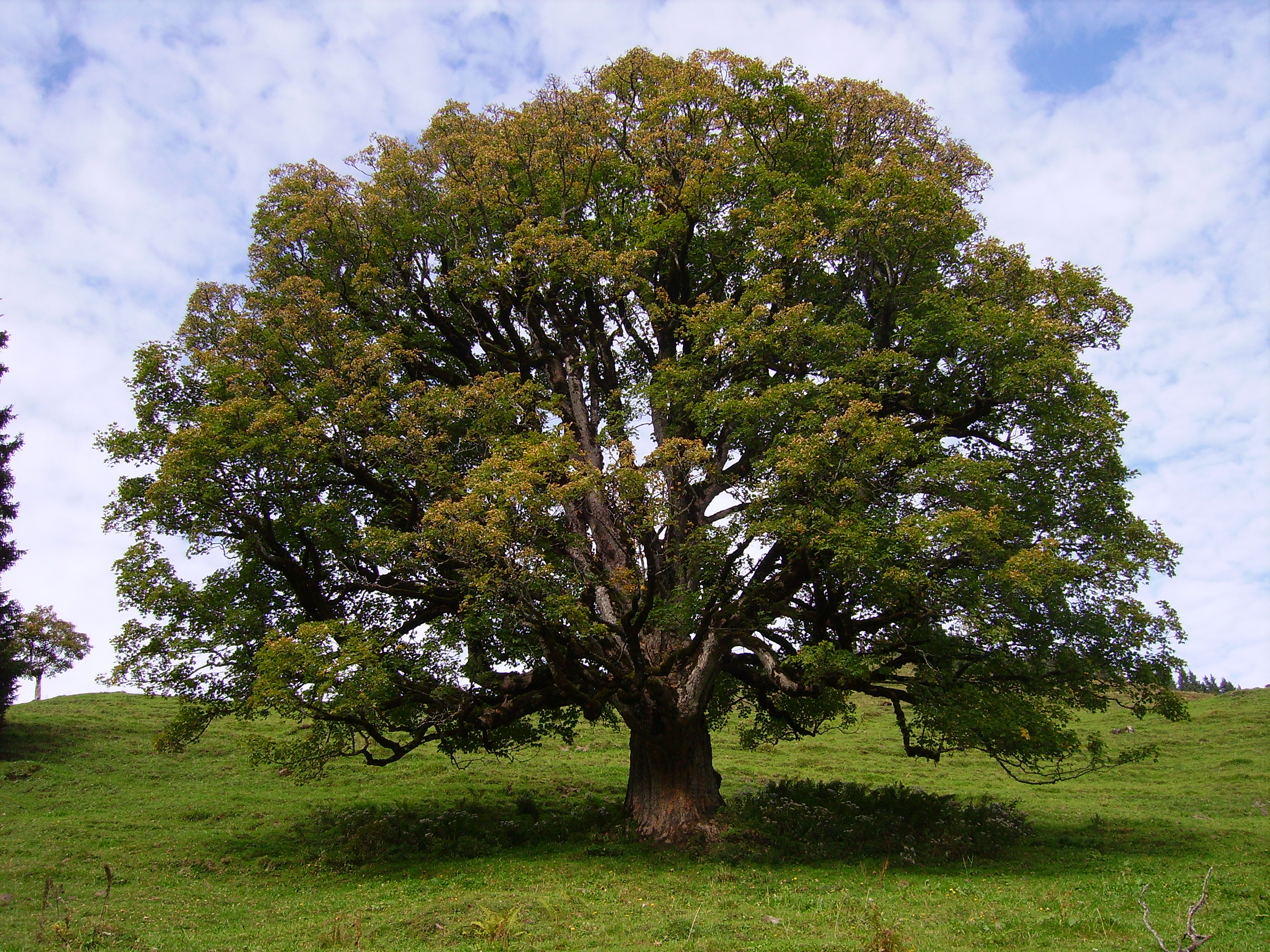
- Sycamore maple, Acer pseudoplatanus, a member of the Eudicots

Scientific classification
- Kingdom: Plantae
- Clade: Tracheophytes
- Clade: Spermatophytes

Extant divisions
- Gymnospermae; Cycadophyta; Ginkgophyta; Pinophyta; Gnetophyta; Angiospermae

Synonyms
- Phanerogamae

= Seed plant =

Seed plants Temporal range: Famennian–Present

Plants that reproduce with seeds

A seed plant or spermatophyte (from Ancient Greek σπέρμα (spérma) 'seed' and φυτόν (phutón) 'plant'; lit. 'seed plant'), also called a phanerogam (taxon Phanerogamae) or a phaenogam (taxon Phaenogamae), is any plant that produces seeds. It is a category of embryophyte (i.e. land plant) that includes most of the familiar land plants, including the flowering plants and the gymnosperms, but not ferns, mosses, or algae.

The term phanerogam or phanerogamae is derived from Ancient Greek φανερός (phanerós), meaning "visible", in contrast to the term "cryptogam" or "cryptogamae" (from Ancient Greek κρυπτός (kruptós) 'hidden', and γαμέω (gaméō), 'to marry'). These terms distinguish those plants with hidden sexual organs (cryptogamae) from those with visible ones (phanerogamae).

== Description ==
The extant spermatophytes form five divisions, the first four of which are classified as gymnosperms, plants that have unenclosed, "naked seeds":

- Cycadophyta, the cycads, a subtropical and tropical group of plants
- Ginkgophyta, a single living species of tree in the genus Ginkgo
- Pinophyta, the conifers, which are cone-bearing trees and shrubs
- Gnetophyta, the gnetophytes, woody plants in the relict genera Ephedra, Gnetum, and Welwitschia.

The fifth extant division is the flowering plants, also known as angiosperms or magnoliophytes, the largest and most diverse group of spermatophytes:

- Angiosperms, the flowering plants, possess seeds enclosed in a fruit, unlike gymnosperms.

In addition to the five living taxa listed above, the fossil record contains evidence of many extinct taxa of seed plants, among those:

- Pteridospermae, the so-called "seed ferns", were one of the earliest successful groups of land plants, and forests dominated by seed ferns were prevalent in the late Paleozoic.
- Glossopteris was the most prominent tree genus in the ancient southern supercontinent of Gondwana during the Permian period.

By the Triassic period, seed ferns had declined in ecological importance, and representatives of modern gymnosperm groups were abundant and dominant through the end of the Cretaceous, when the angiosperms radiated.

== Evolutionary history ==
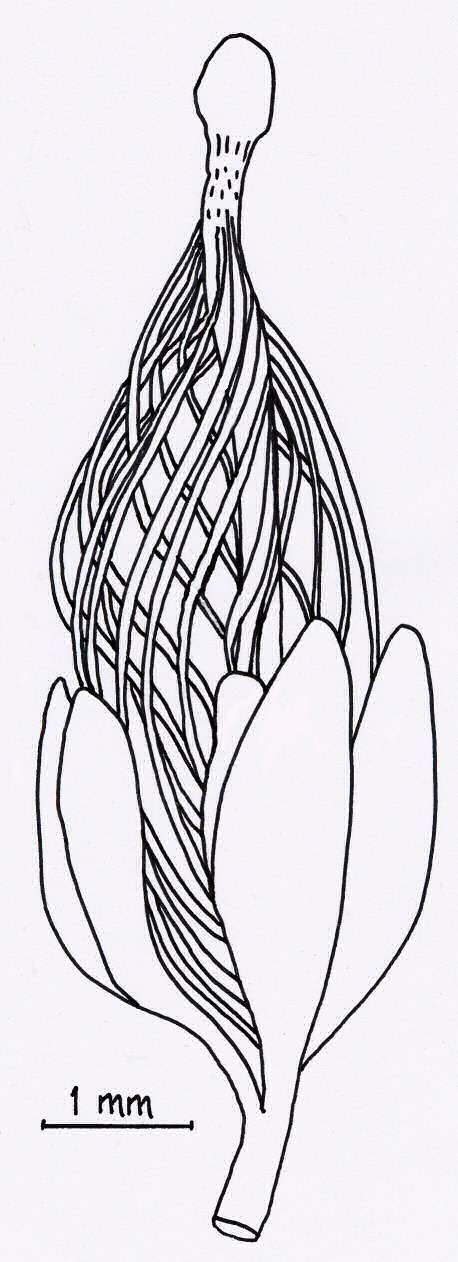
Drawing of Runcaria megasporangium and cupule, resembling a seed without a solid seed coat

A series of evolutionary changes began with a whole genome duplication event in the ancestor of seed plants about 319 million years ago.

A middle Devonian (385-million-year-old) precursor to seed plants from Belgium has been identified predating the earliest seed plants by about 20 million years. Runcaria, small and radially symmetrical, is an integumented megasporangium surrounded by a cupule. The megasporangium bears an unopened distal extension protruding above the multilobed integument. It is suspected that the extension was involved in anemophilous (wind) pollination. Runcaria sheds new light on the sequence of character acquisition leading to the seed. Runcaria has all of the qualities of seed plants except for a solid seed coat and a system to guide the pollen to the seed.

Runcaria was followed shortly after by plants with a more condensed cupule, such as Spermasporites and Moresnetia. Seed-bearing plants had diversified substantially by the Famennian, the last stage of the Devonian. Examples include Elkinsia, Xenotheca, Archaeosperma, "Hydrasperma", Aglosperma, and Warsteinia. Some of these Devonian seeds are now classified within the order Lyginopteridales.

== Phylogeny ==
Seed-bearing plants are a clade within the vascular plants (tracheophytes).

=== Internal phylogeny ===
The spermatophytes were traditionally divided into angiosperms, or flowering plants, and gymnosperms, which includes the gnetophytes, cycads, ginkgo, and conifers. Older morphological studies believed in a close relationship between the gnetophytes and the angiosperms, in particular based on vessel elements. However, molecular studies (and some more recent morphological and fossil papers) have generally shown a clade of gymnosperms, with the gnetophytes in or near the conifers. For example, one common proposed set of relationships is the gnepine hypothesis and looks like:

- Spermatophytes
  - Angiosperms
    (flowering plants)
  - Gymnosperms
    - Cycads
    - Ginkgo
    - - - Pinaceae (the pine family)
        - Gnetophytes
      - Cupressophytes

However, the relationships between these groups should not be considered settled.

=== Other classifications ===
Other classifications group all the seed plants in a single division, with classes for the five groups:

- Division Spermatophyta
  - Cycadopsida, the cycads
  - Ginkgoopsida, the ginkgo
  - Pinopsida, the conifers, ("Coniferopsida")
  - Gnetopsida, the gnetophytes
  - Magnoliopsida, the flowering plants, or Angiospermopsida

A more modern classification ranks these groups as separate divisions (sometimes under the Superdivision Spermatophyta):

- Cycadophyta, the cycads
- Ginkgophyta, the ginkgo
- Pinophyta, the conifers
- Gnetophyta, the gnetophytes
- Magnoliophyta, the flowering plants

Reconstruction of the extinct order Bennettitales

Unassigned extinct spermatophyte orders, some of them formerly grouped as "Pteridospermatophyta", the polyphyletic "seed ferns".

- †Cordaitales
- †Calamopityales
- †Callistophytales
- †Caytoniales
- †Gigantopteridales
- †Glossopteridales
- †Lyginopteridales
- †Medullosales
- †Peltaspermales
- †Umkomasiales (corystosperms)
- †Czekanowskiales
- †Bennettitales
- †Erdtmanithecales
- †Pentoxylales
- †Petriellales Taylor et al. 1994
- †Avatiaceae Anderson & Anderson 2003
- †Axelrodiopsida Anderson & Anderson
- †Alexiales Anderson & Anderson 2003
- †Hamshawviales Anderson & Anderson 2003
- †Hexapterospermales Doweld 2001
- †Hlatimbiales Anderson & Anderson 2003
- †Matatiellales Anderson & Anderson 2003
- †Arberiopsida Doweld 2001
- †Iraniales E. Taylor et al. 2008
- †Vojnovskyales E. Taylor et al. 2008
- †Hermanophytales E. Taylor et al. 2008
- †Dirhopalostachyaceae E. Taylor et al. 2008
