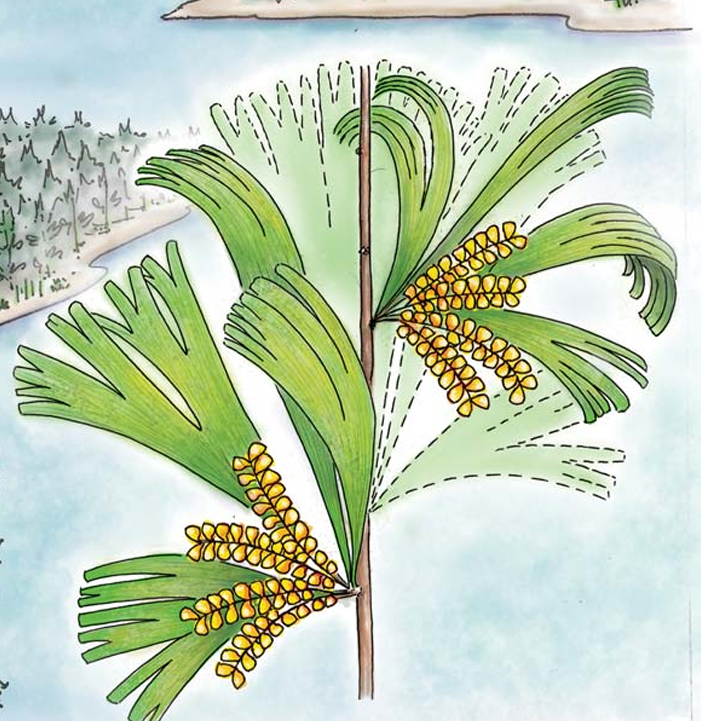
- Illustration of Kannaskoppianthus telemagnus and Rochipteris telefolia And. & And. 2023

Scientific classification
- Kingdom: Plantae
- Clade: Tracheophytes
- Clade: Gymnospermae
- Class: †Pteridospermopsida
- Order: †Petriellales (Taylor, 1994)
- Family: †Petriellaceae (Taylor, 1994)

Genera
- Rochipteris foliage; Kannaskoppianthus pollen organ; Kannaskoppia ovulate structure

Synonyms
- Kannaskoppifolia And. & And. 2023

= Petriellaceae =

Petriellaceae Temporal range: Middle Triassic–Late Triassic

Extinct order of Triassic seed plants

Petriellales is an extinct order of gymnosperms known from Middle Triassic (Olenekian) to Late Triassic (Rhaetian) floras of Gondwana, with fossil findings from Antarctica, Australia, southern Africa and South America. The family Petriellaceae is the only known family in the order. The order is characterized by fan-shaped leaves with anastomosing veins and forked reproductive structures represented by separate female ovulate and male microsporangiate organs. Petriellales plants are thought to have been part of humid understory vegetation of Triassic temperate forests, with fossil occurrences on the high latitudes of Southern Hemisphere.

== Taxonomy and classification ==
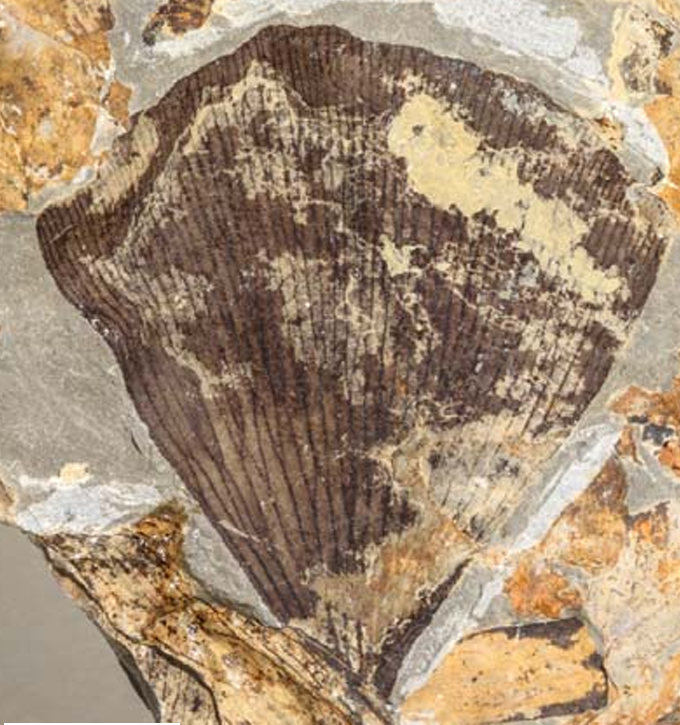
R. lutifolia. Fan-shaped leaf with sparsely reticulate veins.

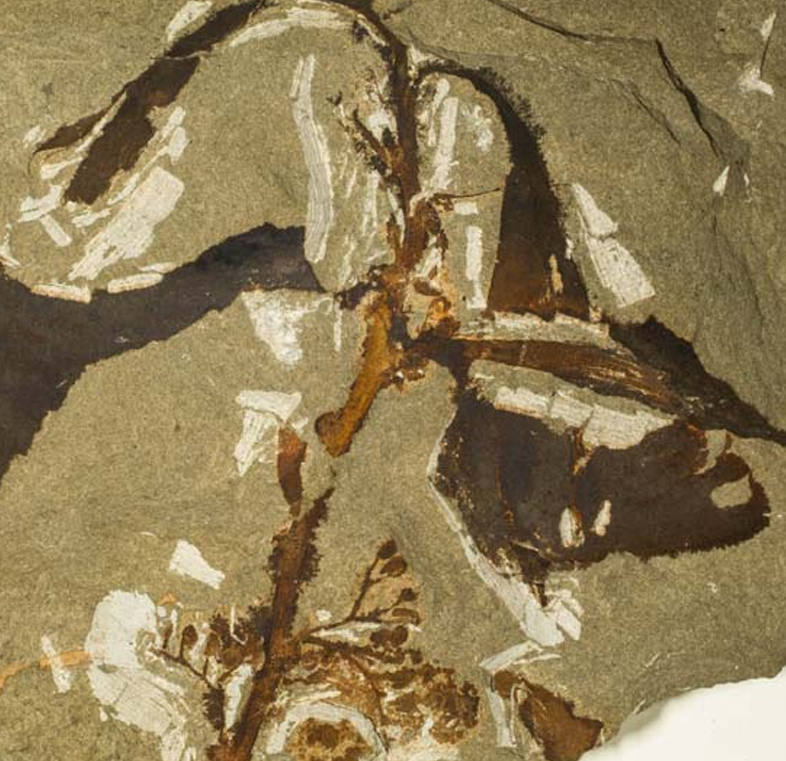
Kannaskoppia vincularis with Rochipteris vincularis.

Petriellales foliage and reproductive structures are most often found separately, which has made classification difficult.

The foliage genus Rochipteris was established in 2001 to define fan-shaped leaves with sparsely reticulate anastomosing venation from Triassic floras across southern Gondwana. Specimens now considered to fall under Rochipteris, have historically been assigned to Chiropteris and Psygmophyllum.Rochipteris differs from Chiropteris by apetiolate leaves (leaves directly attached to the stem) and sparse reticulate veining.

The genus Rochipteris was originally defined to include only isolated leaves and was noted as having no known reproductive structures. Connection between foliage genus Rochipteris (junior synonym: Kannaskoppifolia) and reproductive structures Kannaskoppia and Kannaskoppianthus was made when co-occurring fossil specimens were found in 2003.

== Morphology ==
=== Foliage (Rochipteris) ===
General habit of Rochipteris has been described as "slender, erect, woody shrubs". The leaf form varies between cuneate (wedge-shaped) and flabellate (fan-shaped). Attachment to the stalk varies between genus with some leaves attached directly to the stalk and some leaves within the genius having a short leaf stalk. Veination is fine, forking, radiating from the base, subparallel to the segment margins and anastomosing. Lamina ranges from entire, trifid and segmented into narrow lobes.

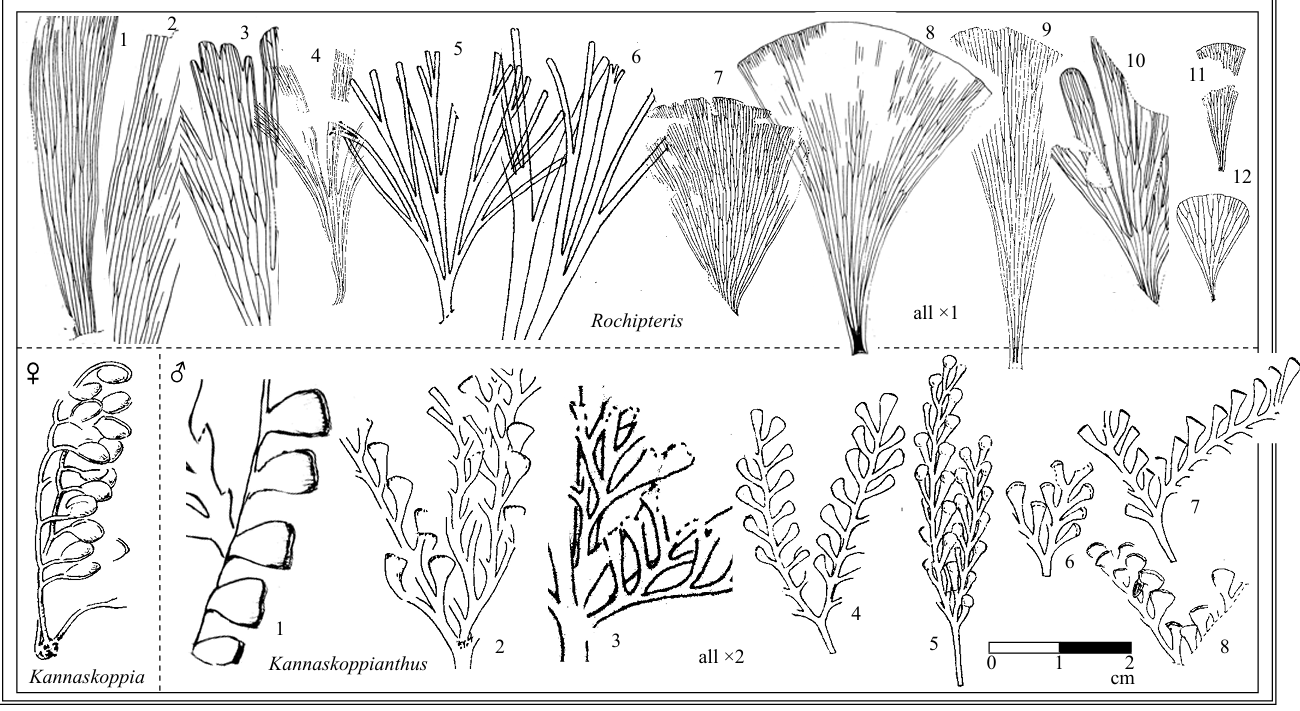
Top: 1)R.vincularis. 2)R.telefolia. 3)R.distivena. 4)R.rolleri. 5)R.switzifolia. 6)R.matatifolia 7)R.komifolia 8)R.lutifolia 9)R. obtriangulata 10)R. cf. sinuosa 11)R. penensis 12)R. pusilla Bottom left: Kannaskoppa vincularis Bottom right: 1)Kannaskoppianthus telemagnus 2)K. Irregularis. 3)K. aasvoelensis 4)K. switzianthus 5)K. matatiparvus 6)K. komanthus 7)K. lutinumerus 8)K. telepentatus

=== Female ovulate (Kannaskoppia) ===
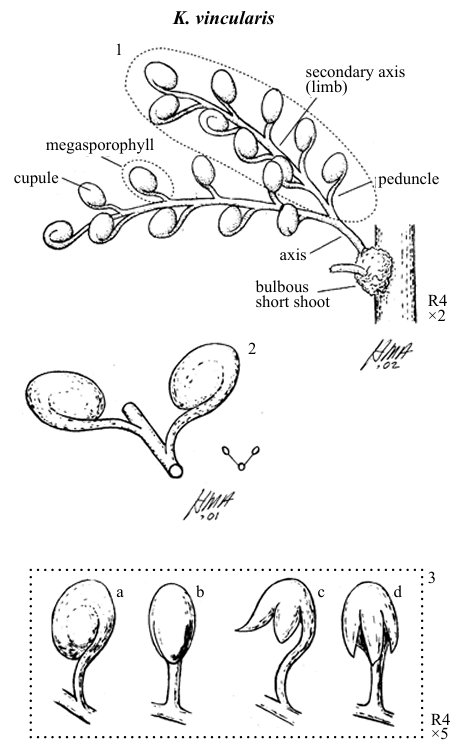
Illustration of ♀K. vincularis with annotated anatomy.

The ovulate organs of the Petriellales are represented by the genus Kannaskoppia, which compromise of fine proximally forked strobilus. On each strobilus, there are 8-12 megasporophylls adaxially with 90 degree angle between the two rows. Each megasporophyll carries one cupule that is bent backwards from the stalk. Cupules curve inwards and divide to three lobes when open. No seeds or ovules have been found.

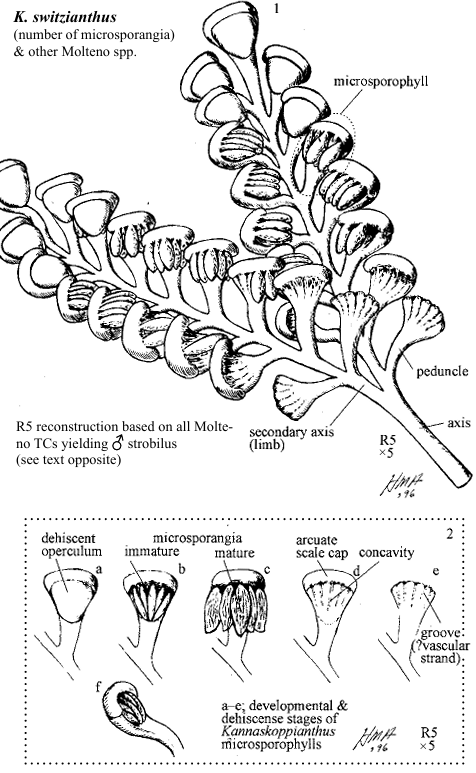
Illustration of ♂K. switzianthus with annotated anatomy.

=== Male microsporangiate (Kannaskoppianthus) ===
Microsporangiate organs of the Petriellales are represented by the genus Kannaskoppianthus, a ginkgoopsid strobilus characterized by proximally forked axis carrying up to 20 microsporophylls that are divided equally and arranged adaxially with 90 degree angle between the rows (similar to Kannaskoppia). Microsporophylls have a spathulate shape and are flattened, and host 5-10 elliptic microsporangia per unit. Pollen has not been observed. Diagnostic characters between Kannaskoppianthus species are 1) size and forking of the strobilus, 2) number of microsporophylls per limb, 3) number of microsporangia per head.

== Paleoecology ==
=== Molteno Formation, southern Africa ===
Petriellales fossils from Upper Triassic Molteno Formation, southern Africa, are though to have occupied a wide range of habitats, but are most often associated with Heidiphyllum thicket, floodplain wetlands, riverine sandbanks and fern meadows.

=== Fremouw Formation, Antarctica ===
Fossils of Petriellales from the Fremouw Formation of Antarctica indicate that the group was part of a warm polar forest biome that experienced extreme seasonality in daylight. During the Triassic, high-latitude regions of Gondwana supported humid, densely vegetated forests under greenhouse conditions with extreme polar light regime.

== Paleogeographic occurrences ==
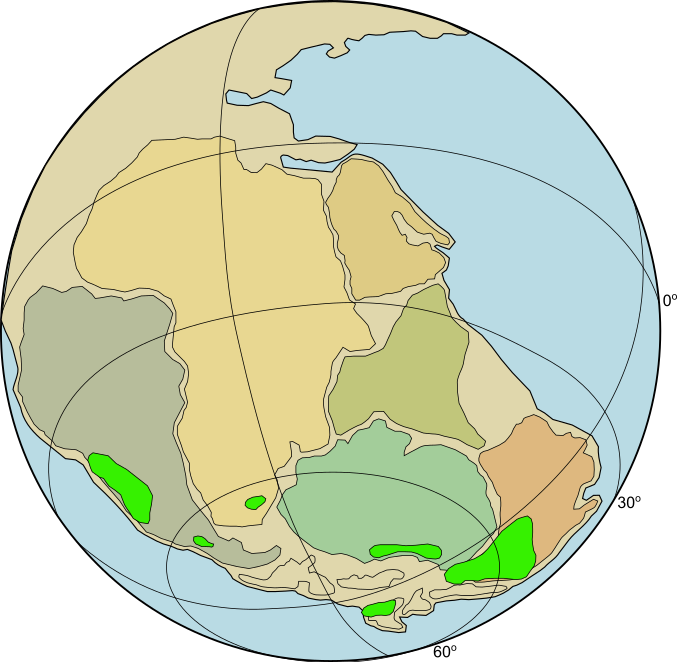
Paleogeographic occurrences of Petriellales highlighted in green on a Triassic base map.

=== South America ===
- La Profeta-Ternera Basin
- Calingasta Basin
- Malargue Basin
- El Querco Los Molles Basin
- Cuyo Basin
- Biobio-Temuco Basin
- El Tranquilo Basin

=== Southern Africa ===
- Molteno Formation

=== Antarctica ===
- Fremouw Peak, Central Transantarctic Mountains
- Allan Hills, South Victoria Land

=== Australia ===
- Telford Basin
- Springfield Basin
- Tasmania Basin
- Council Trench deposits
- Ipswich Basin
- Esk Trough

== Gallery ==
Information about the fossils can be found when clicking on the image.

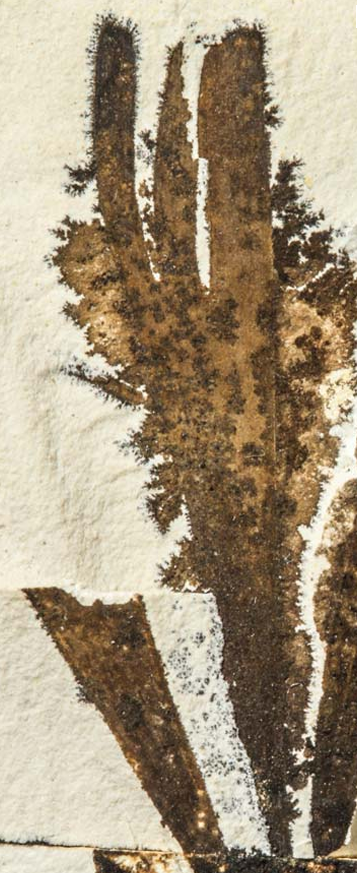
R. rolleri

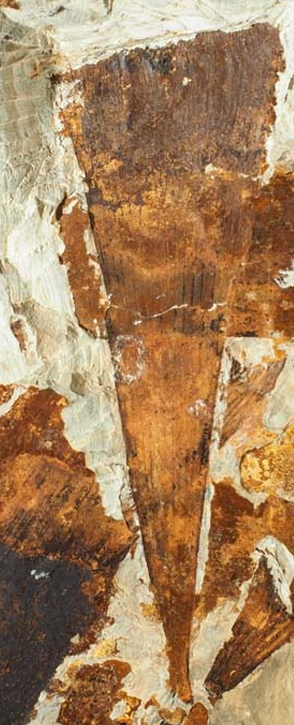
R. penensis

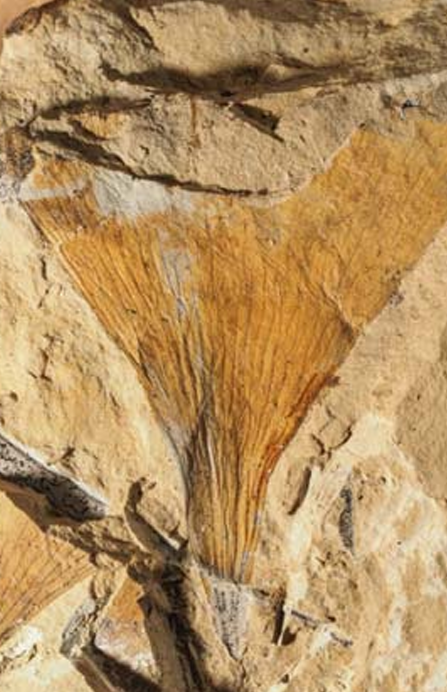
R. komifolia

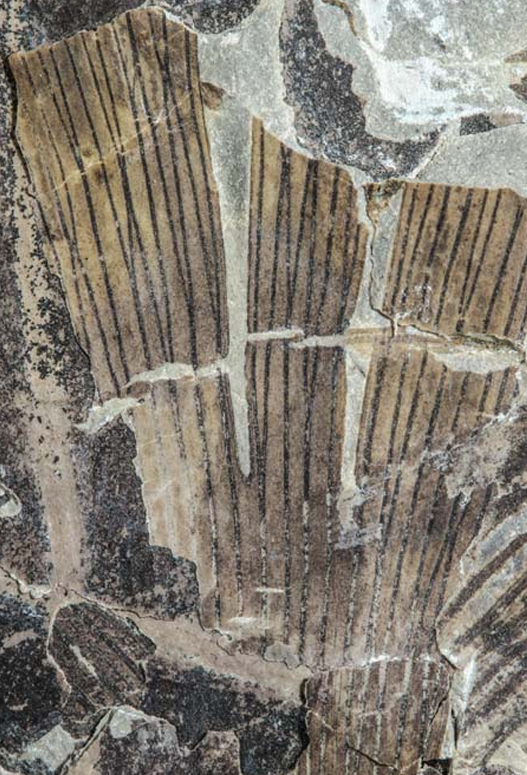
R. vincularis

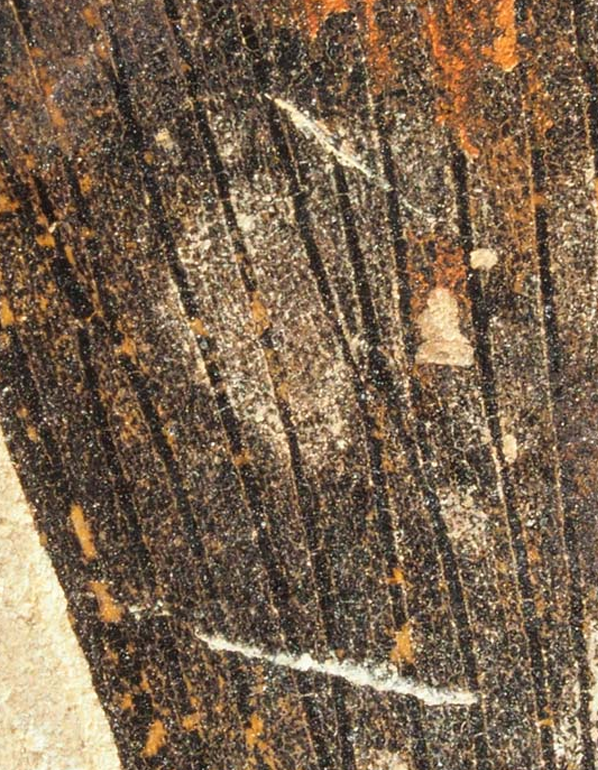
R. telefoila

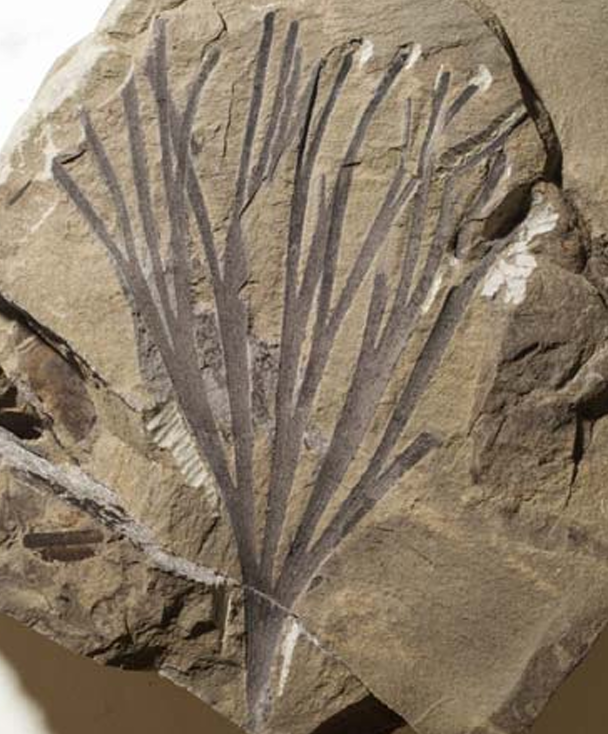
R. matatifolia

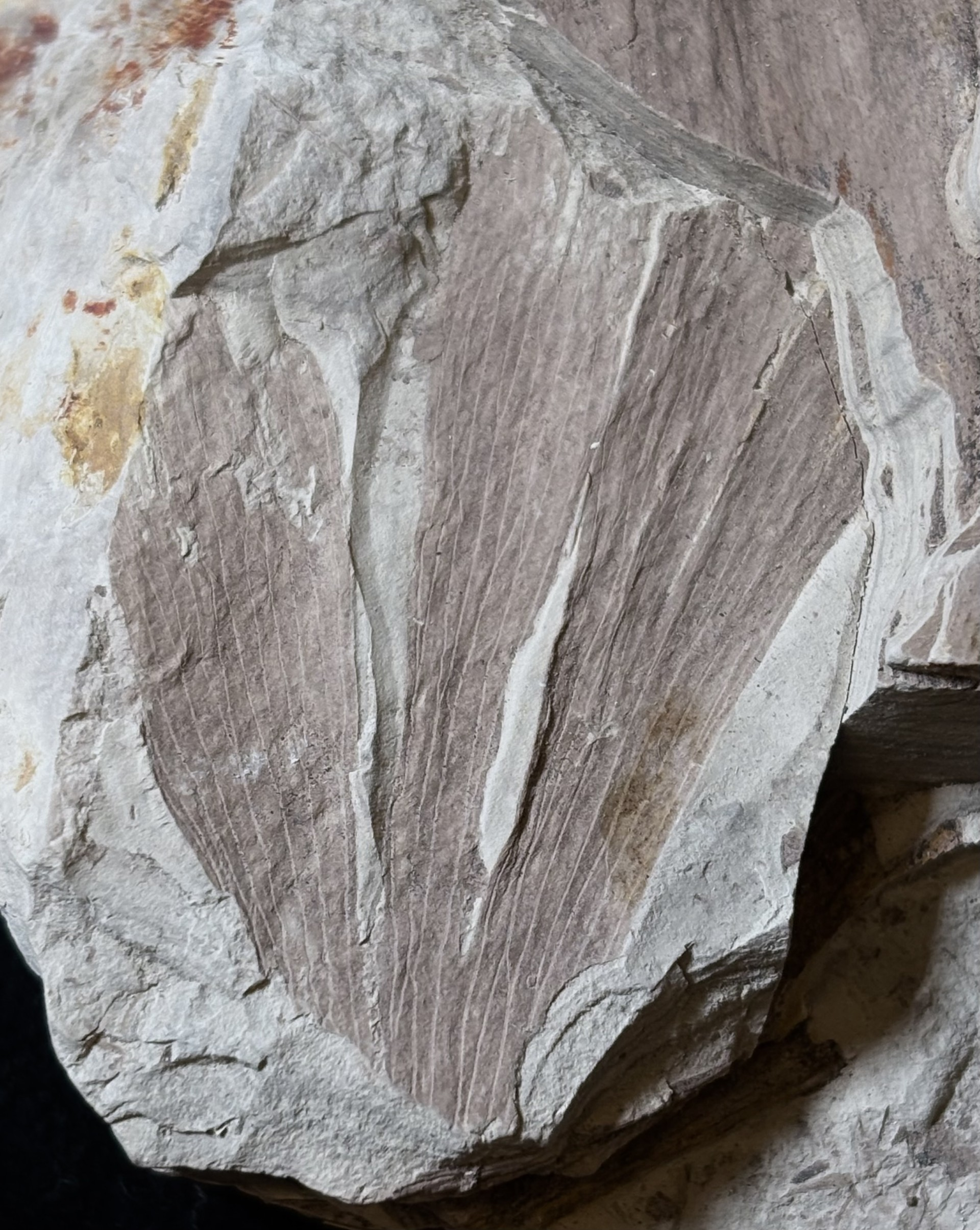
R. sp

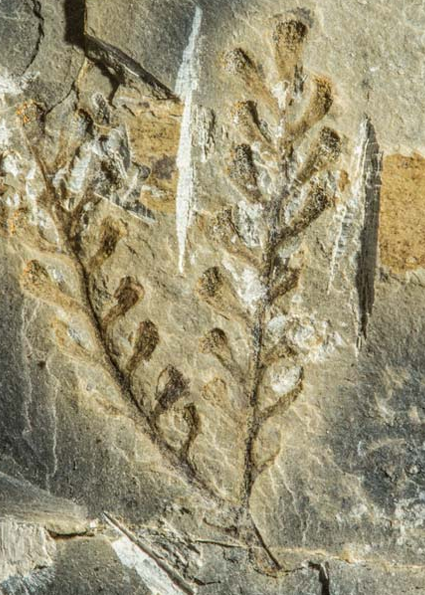
♂ K. lutinumerus

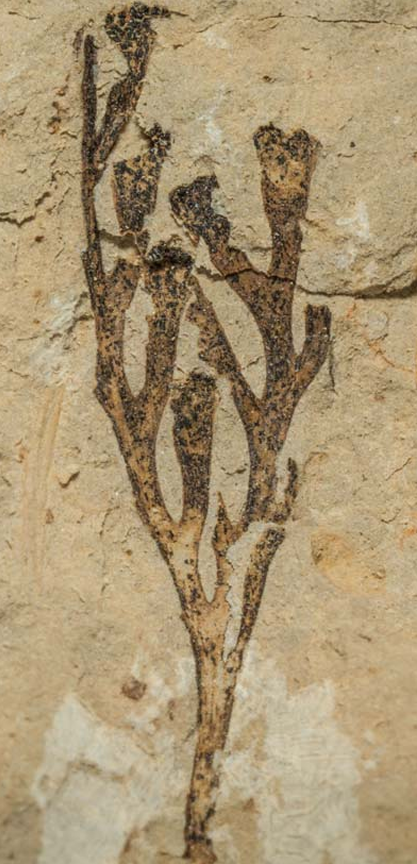
♂K. aasvoelensis

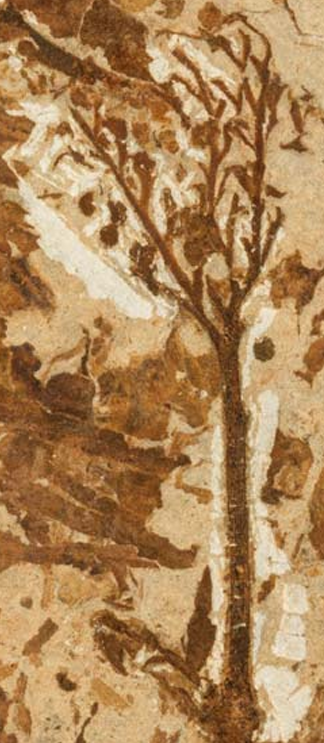
♂K. irregularis

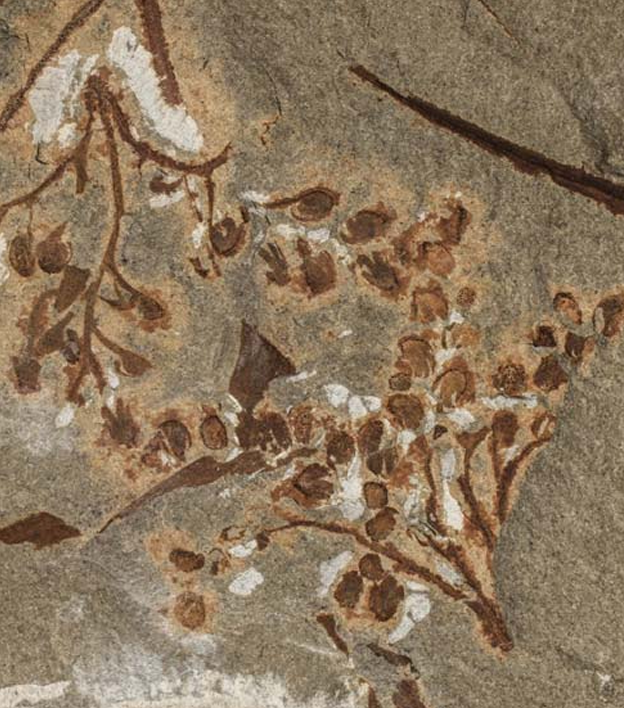
♀ K. vincularis

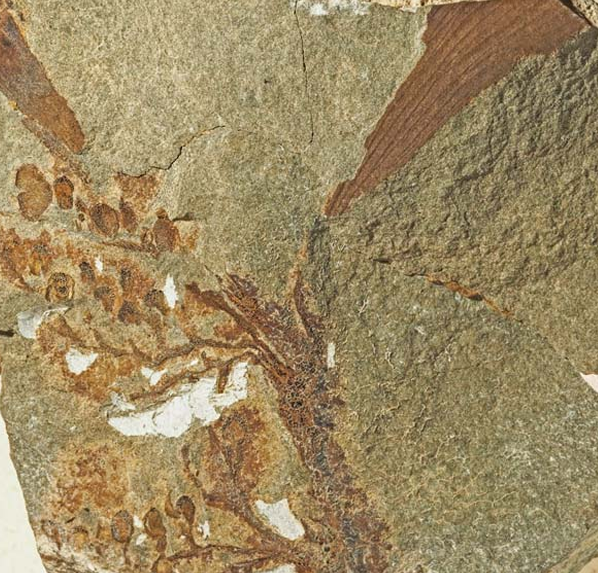
♀K. vincularis, R. vincularis

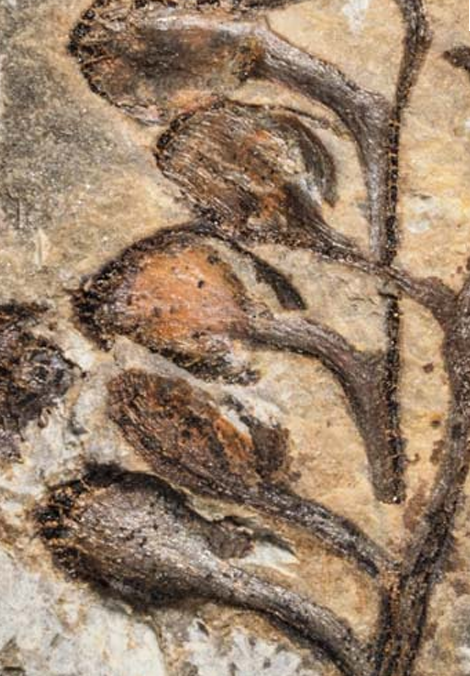
♀K. vincularis
