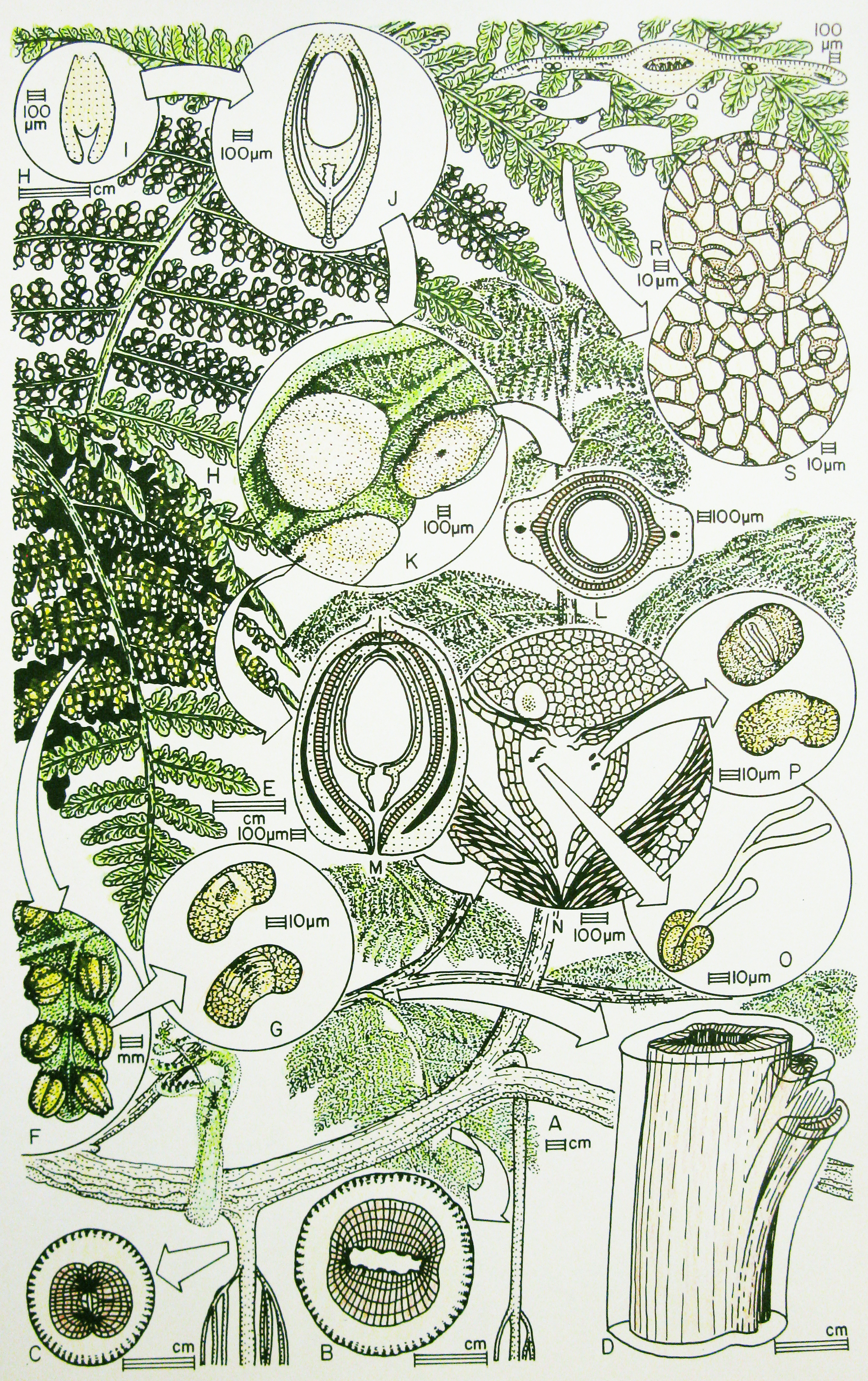
- Reconstruction of the plant Callospermarion pusillum (permineralized ovules), Idanothekion callistophytoides (pollen organ), Dicksonites pluckenetii (leaves), Callistophyton poroxyloides (stem), and Vesicaspora shaubergeri (pollen) from the Pennsylvanian Calhoun Formation of Berryville, Illinois.

Scientific classification
- Kingdom: Plantae
- Clade: Tracheophytes
- Division: †Pteridospermatophyta
- Class: †Lyginopteridopsida (?)
- Order: †Callistophytales; G.W.Rothwell 1981, emend. 1982

Families
- Callistophytaceae; Emplectopteridaceae

= Callistophytales =

Callistophytales Temporal range: Moscovian–Wuchiapingian

Extinct order of plants

Callistophytales is an extinct order of spermatophytes (seed plants) which lived from the Pennsylvanian (Late Carboniferous) to Permian periods. They were mainly scrambling and lianescent (vine-like) plants found in the wetland "coal swamps" of Euramerica and Cathaysia. Like many other early spermatophytes, they could be described as "seed ferns", combining ovule-based reproduction with pinnate leaves superficially similar to modern ferns.

Callistophytales in particular are characterized by their reproductive anatomy. The ovules are bilaterally symmetrical and non-cupulate, attaching to the underside of pinnules that were otherwise morphologically identical to the standard non-reproductive pinnules. The pollen-bearing organs are small compound structures formed from up to eight tapering sporangia fused at their base. They are also borne on the underside of unmodified pinnules. Callistophytalean pollen was saccate (bearing buoyant sacs). Callistophytales were reproductively more sophisticated than most other Palaeozoic pteridosperms, some of which they seem to have out-competed and replaced in the "coal swamp" vegetation during Late Pennsylvanian and Permian times.

Callistophytales are occasionally classified within the class Lyginopteridopsida, alongside the order Lyginopteridales. This proposal is controversial due to the apparent sophistication of the ovules and pollen. There are nevertheless many other characters that suggest that the Callistophytales is derived from a more primitive lyginopterdalean-like ancestor, including the presence of a lagenostome at the apex of the nucellus, the general structure of the pollen organs, and the overall morphology of the vegetative structures.

Two families have been recognised: the Callistophytaceae, known mainly from the Carboniferous floras of Euramerica; and the Emplectopteridaceae, known mainly from the Permian floras of China and adjacent areas.
