= Lyginopteridaceae =

Lyginopteridaceae Temporal range: Carboniferous

Scientific classification
- Kingdom: Plantae
- Clade: Tracheophytes
- Division: †Pteridospermatophyta
- Class: †Lyginopteridopsida
- Order: †Lyginopteridales
- Family: †Lyginopteridaceae

Genera
- Lagenostoma ovulate structures; Lyginopteris permineralized wood; Sphenopteris leaves; Telangium pollen organs; Tetrastichia? ovulate structures

Extinct family of plants

Lyginopteridaceae is an extinct family of plants (Pteridospermatophyta) in North America and European Carboniferous coal measures.

== Description ==
Lyginopteridaceae were shrubs and vines with radiospermic ovules containing a lagenostome. They consisted of forms with monostelic stem petioles usually with single strand and small seeds. Family members include Lyginopteris and Heterangium.
