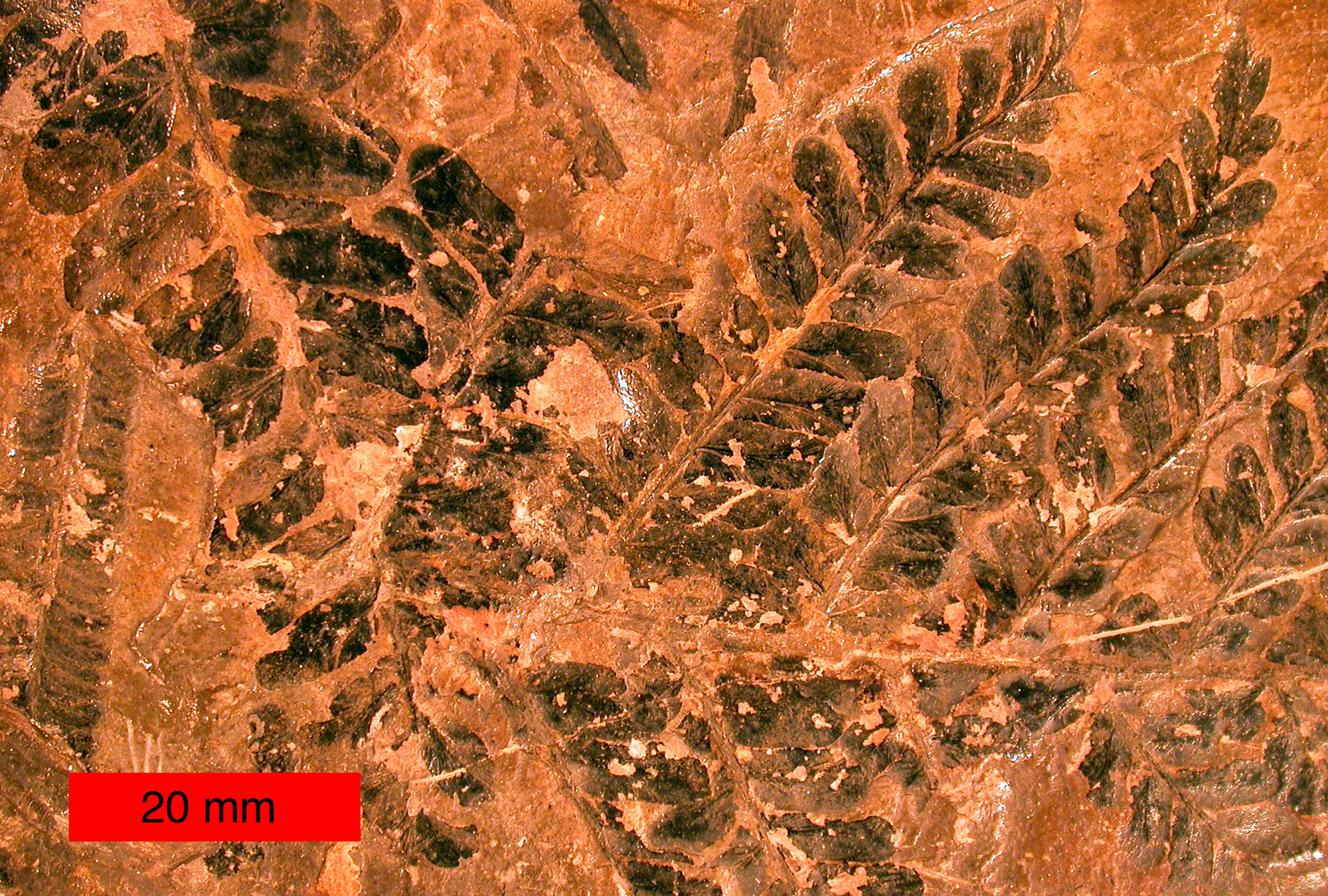
- Fossil seed fern leaves of Neuropteris (Medullosales) from the Late Carboniferous of northeastern Ohio.
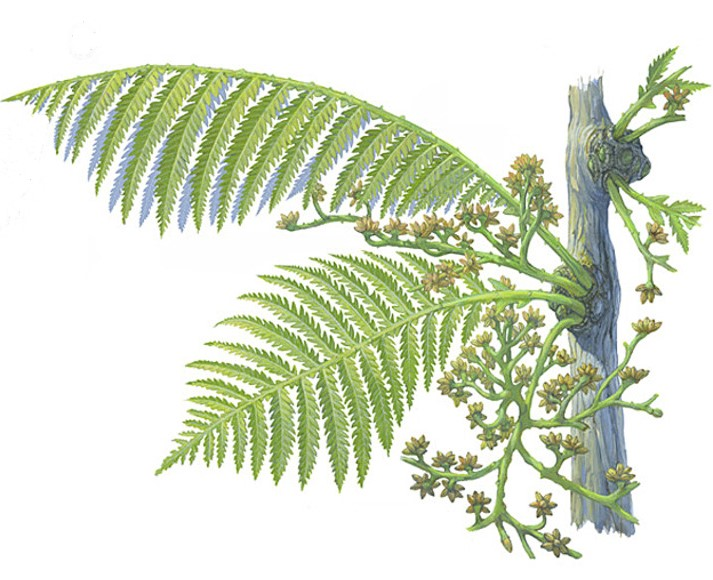
- Life restoration of Lepidopteris (Peltaspermales)

Scientific classification
- Kingdom: Plantae
- Clade: Tracheophytes
- Clade: Spermatophytes
- Division: †Pteridospermatophyta

Groups included
- †Calamopityales; †Callistophytales; †Caytoniales; †Gigantopteridales; †Glossopteridales; †Lyginopteridales; †Medullosales; †Peltaspermales; †Corystospermales (also referred to as Umkomasiales); †Petriellales

Excluded
- Angiospermae (flowering plants); Cycadales (cycads); Ginkgoales (ginkgos); Pinophyta (conifers); Gnetophyta; †Bennettitales; †Czekanowskiales; †Cordaitales

Synonyms
- Pteridospermatopsida

= Pteridosperm =

Pteridosperm Temporal range: 376 –50 Ma Late Devonian – Early Eocene

Several distinct polyphyletic groups of extinct seed-bearing plants

Pteridosperms, also known as seed ferns, are a polyphyletic grouping of extinct seed-producing plants. The earliest fossil evidence for plants of this type are the lyginopterids of late Devonian age. They flourished particularly during the Carboniferous and Permian periods. Pteridosperms declined during the Mesozoic Era and had mostly disappeared by the end of the Cretaceous Period, though Komlopteris seem to have survived into Eocene times, based on fossil finds in Tasmania.

With regard to the enduring utility of this division, many palaeobotanists still use the pteridosperm grouping in an informal sense to refer to the seed plants that are not angiosperms, coniferoids (conifers or cordaites), ginkgophytes (ginkgos or czekanowskiales), cycadophytes (cycads or bennettites), or gnetophytes. This is particularly useful for extinct seed plant groups whose systematic relationships remain speculative, as they can be classified as pteridosperms with no invalid implications being made as to their systematic affinities. Also, from a purely curatorial perspective the term pteridosperms is a useful shorthand for describing the fern-like fronds that were probably produced by seed plants, which are commonly found in many Palaeozoic and Mesozoic fossil floras.

== History of classification ==
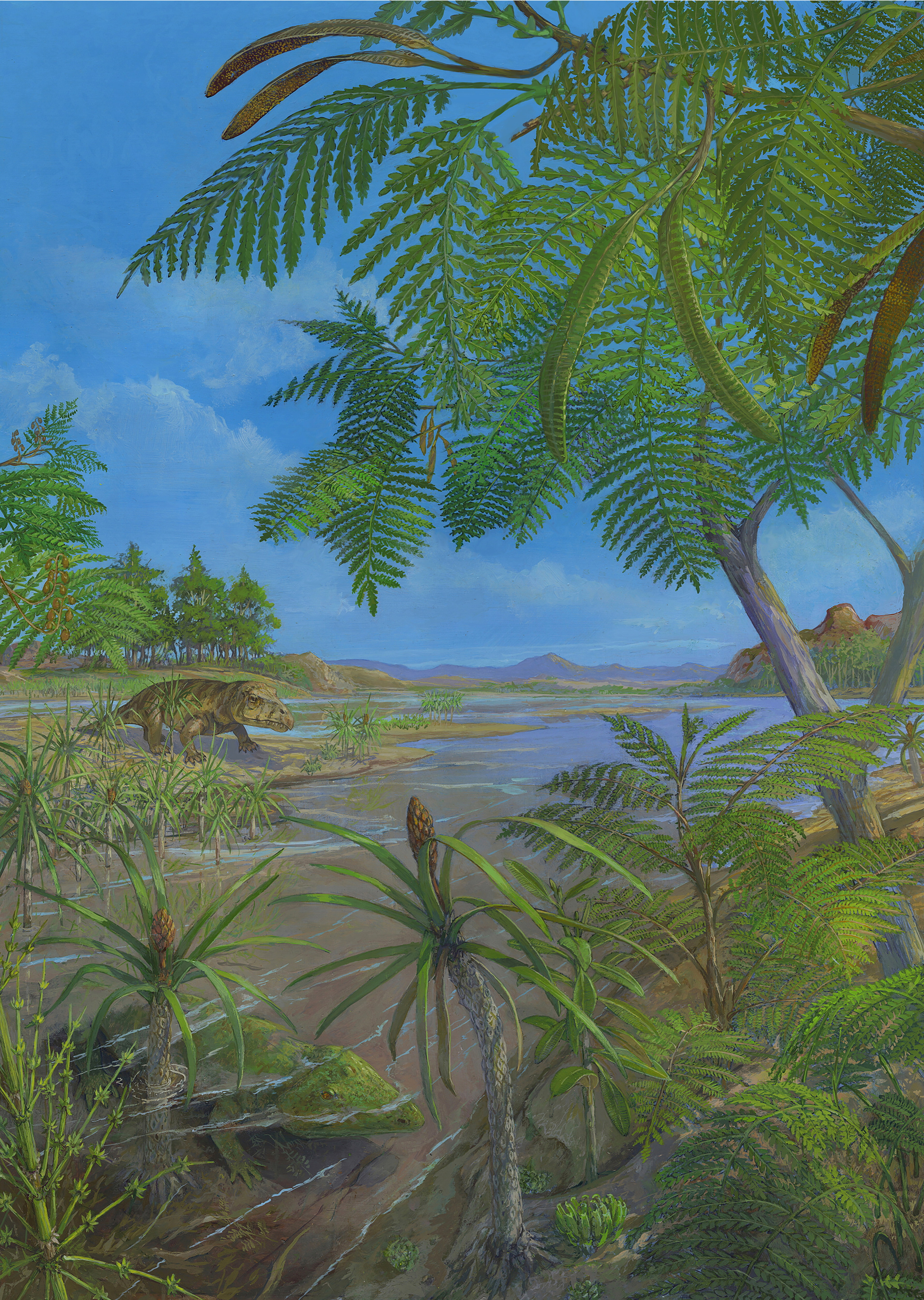
Life restoration of the seed fern Dicroidium (Corystospermales/Umkomasiales, top right), in an Early Triassic Australian landscape

The concept of pteridosperms goes back to the late 19th century when palaeobotanists came to realise that many Carboniferous fossils resembling fern fronds had anatomical features more reminiscent of the modern-day seed plants, the cycads. In 1899 the German palaeobotanist Henry Potonié coined the term "Cycadofilices" ("cycad-ferns") for such fossils, suggesting that they were a group of non-seed plants intermediate between the ferns and cycads. Shortly afterwards, the British palaeobotanists Frank Oliver and Dukinfield Henry Scott (with the assistance of Oliver's student at the time, Marie Stopes) made the critical discovery that some of these fronds (genus Lyginopteris) were associated with seeds (genus Lagenostoma) that had identical and very distinctive glandular hairs, and concluded that both fronds and seeds belonged to the same plant. Soon, additional evidence came to light suggesting that seeds were also attached to the Carboniferous fern-like fronds Dicksonites, Neuropteris and Aneimites. Initially it was still thought that they were "transitional fossils" intermediate between the ferns and cycads, and especially in the English-speaking world they were referred to as "seed ferns" or "pteridosperms". Today, despite being regarded by most palaeobotanists as only distantly related to ferns, these spurious names have nonetheless established themselves. Nowadays, four orders of Palaeozoic seed plants tend to be referred to as pteridosperms: Lyginopteridales, Medullosales, Callistophytales and Peltaspermales, with "Mesozoic seed ferns" including the Petriellales, Corystospermales and Caytoniales.

Their discovery attracted considerable attention at the time, as the pteridosperms were the first extinct group of vascular plants to be identified solely from the fossil record. In the 19th century the Carboniferous Period was often referred to as the "Age of Ferns" but these discoveries during the first decade of the 20th century made it clear that the "Age of Pteridosperms" was perhaps a better description.

During the 20th century the concept of pteridosperms was expanded to include various Mesozoic groups of seed plants with fern-like fronds, such as the Corystospermaceae. Some palaeobotanists also included seed plant groups with entire leaves such as the Glossopteridales and Gigantopteridales, which was stretching the concept. In the context of modern phylogenetic models, the groups often referred to as pteridosperms appear to be liberally spread across a range of clades, and many palaeobotanists today would regard pteridosperms as little more than a paraphyletic 'grade-group' with no common lineage. One of the few characters that may unify the group is that the ovules were borne in a cupule, a group of enclosing branches, but this has not been confirmed for all "pteridosperm" groups.

It has been speculated that some seed fern groups may be close to the ancestry of flowering plants (angiosperms). A 2009 study concluded that "phylogenetic analysis techniques have surpassed the hard data needed to formulate meaningful phylogenetic hypotheses" regarding the relationships of "seed ferns" to living plant groups.

== Taxonomy ==
=== Major groups ===
- Order †Calamopityales Němejc (1963)
- Order †Corystospermales Petriella (1981) [= Umkomasiales Doweld (2001)]
- Order †Callistophytales Rothwell (1981) emend. Anderson, Anderson & Cleal (2007) [Poroxylales Němejc (1968)]
- Order †Petriellales Taylor et al. (1994)
- Order †Peltaspermales Taylor (1981) [Lepidopteridales Němejc (1968)]
- Order †Gigantopteridales Li & Yao (1983) [Gigantonomiales Meyen (1987)]
- Order †Pentoxylales Pilger & Melchior (1954)
- Order †Glossopteridales Plumstead, 1956
- Order †Caytoniales Gothan (1932)
- Order †Medullosales Corsin (1960)
- Order †Lyginopteridales (Corsin (1960)) Havlena (1961) [Lagenostomatales Seward ex Long (1975); Lyginodendrales Nemejc (1968); Sphenopteridales Schimper 1869]
  - Family †Angaranthaceae Naugolnykh (2012)
  - Family †Heterangiaceae Němejc (1950) nom. nud.
  - Family †Physostomataceae Long (1975)
  - Family †Lyginopteridaceae Potonie (1900) emend. Anderson, Anderson & Cleal (2007) [Lagenostomataceae Long (1975; Pityaceae Scott (1909); Lyginodendraceae Scott (1909); Sphenopteridaceae Gopp. (1842); Pseudopecopteridaceae Lesquereux (1884); Megaloxylaceae Scott (1909), nom. rej.; Rhetinangiaceae Scott (1923), nom. rej.; Tetratmemaceae Němejc (1968)]
  - Family †Moresnetiaceae Němejc (1963) emend. Anderson, Anderson & Cleal (2007) [Genomospermaceae Long (1975); Elkinsiaceae Rothwell, Scheckler & Gillespie (1989) ex Cleal; Hydraspermaceae]

=== Other minor groups ===
- Class incertae sedis
  - Order incertae sedis
    - Family ?†Nystroemiaceae Wang & Pfefferkorn (2009)
      - †Nystroemia Halle (1927)
    - Family †Austrocalyxaceae Vega & Archangelsky (2001)
      - †Austrocalyx
      - †Polycalyx
      - †Rinconadia
      - †Jejenia
      - †Fedekurtzia (Archangelsky) emend. Coturel et Césari, 2017
  - Order ?†Alexiales Anderson & Anderson (2003)
    - Family †Alexiaceae Anderson & Anderson (2003)
      - †Alexia Anderson & Anderson (2003)
  - Order †Buteoxylonales
    - Family †Buteoxylonaceae Barnard & Long (1973)
      - †Buteoxylon Barnard & Long (1973)
      - †Triradioxylon Barnard & Long (1975)
  - Order †Dicranophyllales Meyen (1984) emend. Anderson, Anderson & Cleal (2007)
    - Family †Dicranophyllaceae Němejc (1959) ex Archangelsky & Cúneo (1990)
    - Family †Trichopityaceae Němejc (1968) [Florin emend.]
    - †Polyspermophyllum? Archangelsky and Cúneo (1990) (possibly a coniferophyte)
  - Order †Erdtmanithecales Friis and Pedersen (1996)
  - Order †Fredlindiales Anderson & Anderson (2003)
  - Order †Hamshawviales Anderson & Anderson (2003)
  - Order †Hlatimbiales Anderson & Anderson (2003)
    - Family †Hlatimbiaceae Anderson & Anderson (2003)
      - †Hlatimbia Anderson & Anderson (2003)
      - †Batiopteris Anderson & Anderson (2003)
  - Order †Matatiellales Anderson & Anderson (2003)
  - Order †Nilssoniales Darrah (1960) (possibly cycadopsids)
  - Order †Phasmatocycadales Doweld (2001) [Taeniopteridales]
    - Family †Phasmatocycadaceae Doweld (2001) [Spermopteridaceae Doweld (2001)]
      - †Lesleya Lesquereux (1879–80) (otherwise placed as incetae sedis regarding family and order)
- Class †Axelrodiopsida Anderson & Anderson (2007)
  - Order †Axelrodiales Anderson & Anderson (2007)
    - Family †Axelrodiaceae Anderson & Anderson (2007)
      - †Axelrodia Cornet (1986)
      - †Sanmiguelia Brown (1956)
      - †Synangispadixis Cornet (1986)
    - Family †Zamiostrobacea Anderson & Anderson (2007)
      - †Zamiostrobus Endlicher (1836)
- Incertae sedis to order and family:
  - †Gnetopsis Renault et Zeiller (1884)
  - †Pullaritheca Rothwell and Wight (1989)
  - †Kegelidium Dolianiti (1954)
  - †Ptilozamites
  - †Pitus (also known as Pitys)
