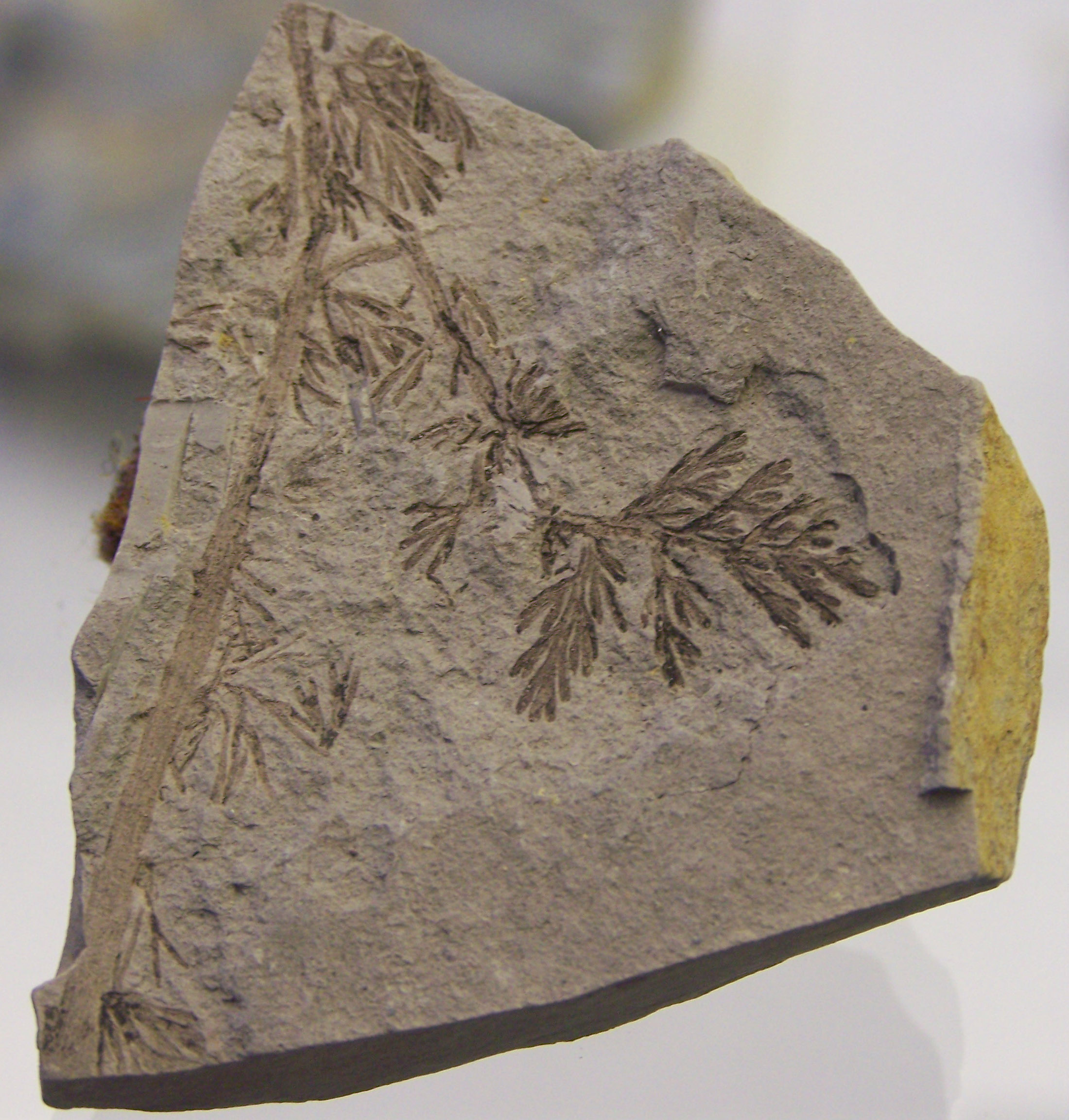
- Diplopteridium holdenii, Early Carboniferous Drybrook Sandstone, Forest of Dean, UK.

Scientific classification
- Kingdom: Plantae
- Clade: Tracheophytes
- Division: †Pteridospermatophyta
- Class: †Lyginopteridopsida
- Order: †Lyginopteridales

Families
- Moresnetiaceae; Genomospermaceae; Eospermaceae; Lyginopteridaceae; Physostomaceae

= Lyginopteridales =

Lyginopteridales Temporal range: Famennian–Lopingian

Prehistoric plant order

The Lyginopteridales are an extinct group of seed plants known from the Paleozoic. They were the first plant fossils to be described as pteridosperms (a polyphyletic group sometimes referred to as "seed ferns") and, thus, the group on which the concept of pteridosperms was first developed; they are the stratigraphically oldest-known pteridosperms, occurring first in late Devonian strata; and they have the most primitive features, most notably in the structure of their ovules. During early and most of middle Pennsylvanian times the Medullosales took over as the more important of the larger pteridosperms but the Lyginopteridales continued to flourish as climbing (lianescent) and scrambling plants. However, later in Middle Pennsylvanian times the Lyginopteridales went into serious decline, probably being out-competed by the Callistophytales that occupied similar ecological niches but had more sophisticated reproductive strategies. A few species continued into Late Pennsylvanian times, and in Cathaysia and east equatorial Gondwana they persisted into the Late Permian, but subsequently became extinct. Most evidence of the Lyginopteridales suggests that they grew in tropical latitudes of the time, in North America, Europe and China.

== Ovules ==
As the Lyginopteridales are the earliest-known gymnosperms, and the development of ovules was one of the key innovations that enabled seed plants eventually to dominate land vegetation, the evolution of lyginopteridalean ovules has attracted considerable interest from palaeobotanists. The most important work on these early ovules was by the British palaeobotanist Albert Long, based mainly on early Mississippian, anatomically preserved fossils from Scotland (UK).

Some of the earliest ovules (e.g., Genomosperma) consisted of a nucellus (the equivalent of the sporangium wall) surrounded by a sheath of slender axes known as a pre-integument. It is widely thought that this arrangement was derived from an ancestral condition where there was a cluster of sporangium-bearing axes, but where only one eventually retained its megasporangium, the others forming the surrounding pre-integument. Progressively, this sheath of axes became fused to form a continuous integument that surrounded and protected the nucellus, such as in Eurystoma and then Stamnostoma. These earliest ovules had the apical part of the nucellus exposed, from which there was a projection known as a lagenostome (sometimes also called a salpinx) that facilitated capture of the pollen and directed it down to the pollen chamber above the megagametophyte. In later, Pennsylvanian-age ovules such as Lagenostoma the nucellus became almost entirely encased by and fused to the integument, leaving just the small distal opening in the integument known as the micropyle through which pollen passed. Nevertheless, most lyginopteridalean ovules retained a lagenostome, despite its function in pollen capture having been replaced by the micropyle.

As with all seed-plants, the lyginopteridalean ovules had just one functional seed megaspore within the nucellus. In some, however, three other, aborted megaspores were still present that together with the functional megaspore represented the remains of what would have been the tetrad of megaspores in the ancestral pre-seed plants.

Most if not all lyginopteridalean ovules were borne in an outer protective sheath of tissue known as a cupule (there are some lyginopteridalean ovules that have been reported without a cupule, but these may simply have been shed from the cupule before being fossilised). In Late Devonian and early Mississippian species, the cupule contained several ovules, but by Pennsylvanian times there was normally just a single ovule per cupule. A number of cases have been found of cupules occurring in clusters at the ends of branching axes. Many palaeobotanists now interpret these clusters of cupulate organs as fertile fronds, in which the cupulate tissue was derived from the laminate part of the frond that surrounded the ovule and thereby provided added protection for it.

Most lyginopteridalean ovules were radiospermic. The only notable exceptions were a distinctive group of Mississippian-age lyginopteridaleans that had platyspermic ovules and are referred to the fossil family the Eospermaceae.

== Pollen organs ==
The Lyginopteridales produced small trilete pre-pollen that superficially resemble the spores of non-seed plants but with a fundamentally gymnosperm-like wall-structure. The pre-pollen was produced by sporangia that formed regular clusters (synangia). The stratigraphically older lyginopteridaleans had trusses of synangia borne on slender axes, which were attached to vegetative fronds; these are referred to the fossil genera Telangium if they are anatomically preserved or Telangiopsis if they occur as adpressions. The more primitive forms of Telangium had sporangial walls that were essentially uniform in thickness. In stratigraphically younger Telangium species, however, the side of each sporangium that formed the outer surface of the synangium tended to be thicker than the inwards-facing wall, suggesting that the sporangia split to release the pre-pollen along this inner wall.

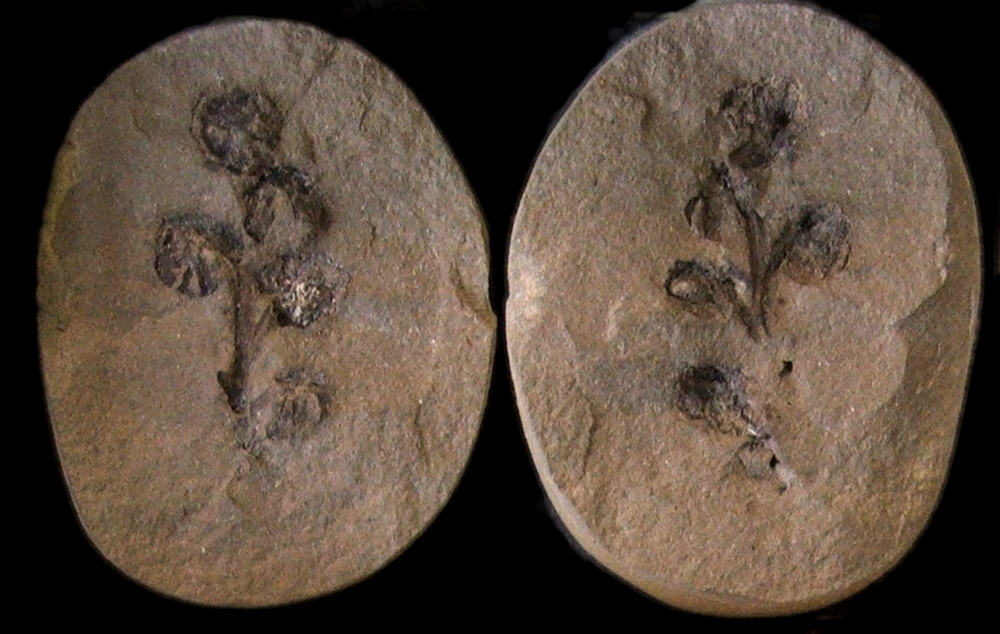
Crossotheca hughesiana Pennsylvanian (middle Westphalian) age, Coseley, near Dudley, UK.

In Pennsylvanian-age lyginopteridalean synangia, the sporangia were usually attached to a pad of tissue that was probably homologous to a pinnule on the vegetative fronds. For instance, Crossotheca synangia bore elongate, "epaulet"-shaped pads, that were arranged in a pinnate pattern in a frond that was wholly or partially fertile. The Feraxotheca synangium in contrast had a much less elongate, almost radial pad.

== Stems ==
The Mississippian-aged lyginopteridaleans tended to have a simple protostele usually surrounded by secondary wood, but in later forms there was a eustele with a central core of pith or mixed-pith. In most cases the amount of secondary wood was limited suggesting they were stems of scrambling or climbing plants, but some Mississippian-aged forms (e.g., Pitys) had substantial secondary wood and was probably the trunk of a large tree. The stele is surrounded by a zone of cortex, which in many genera contains bands of fibrous tissue. This fibrous tissue often results in distinctive markings on the surface of the stems even when preserved as adpressions and can help with their generic identification: Lyginopteris for instance shows a mesh-shaped patterning on the surface of the stems, whereas Heterangium has mainly transverse bars.

== Foliage ==
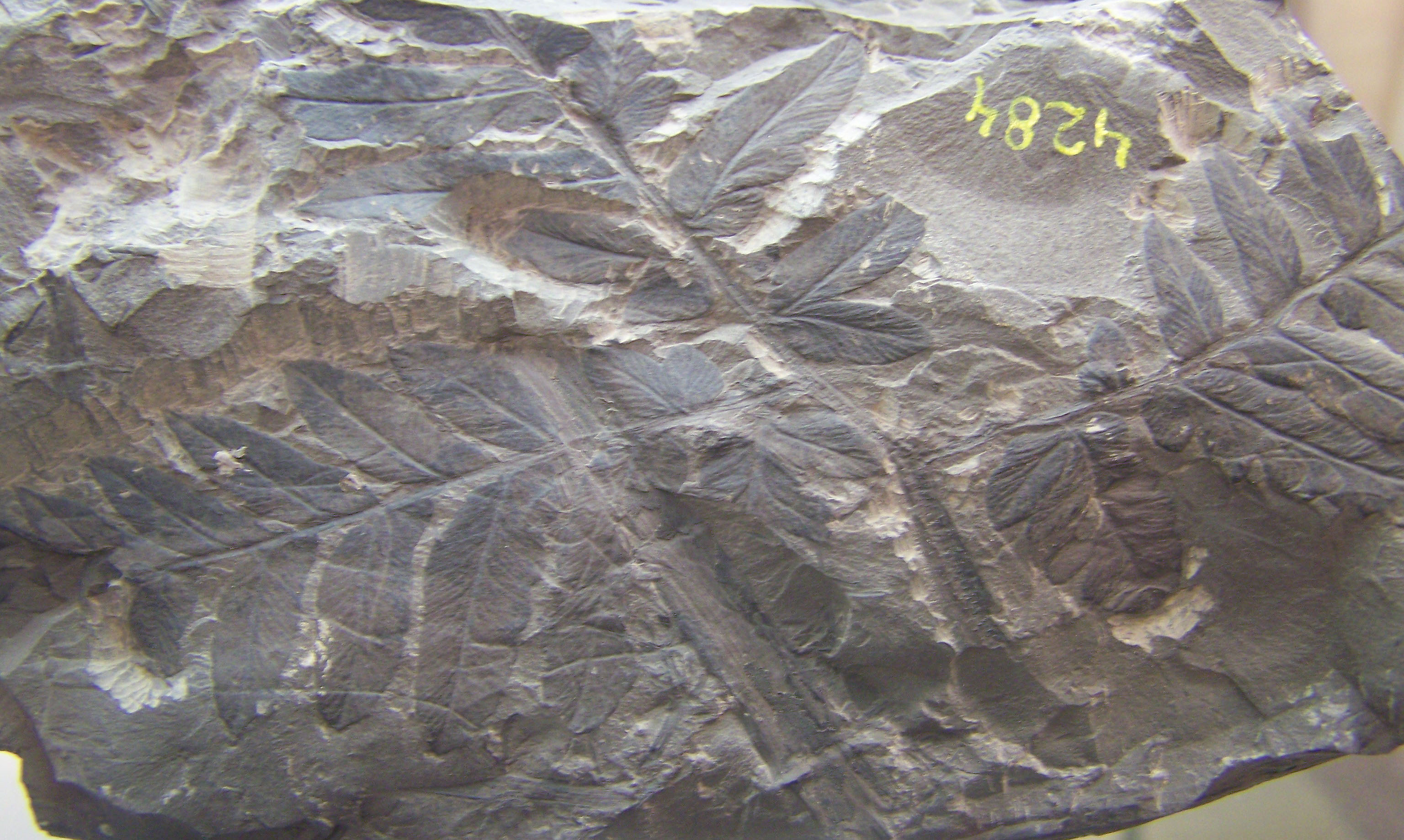
Part of a Pennsylvanian-age Mariopteris frond

As with most pteridosperms, fragments of the foliage are the most commonly found fossilised remains of the Lyginopteridales. When found complete, the fronds always seem to have a main rachis that dichotomises in the lower (proximal) part. In some cases, the two branches each underwent a second dichotomy, resulting in what is termed a quadripartite frond, but in others there is just the main proximal dichotomy, resulting in a bipartite frond. The branches produced by these dichotomies then undergo further divisions in a pinnate manner similar to that seen in fern fronds. The ultimate segments (pinnules) of the fronds are mostly lobate or digitate.

Various fossil genera are recognised for these fronds, distinguished on whether the frond was bipartite or quadripartite, whether there were pinnae attached to the main rachis below the main dichotomy, the general shape of the pinnules, and the surface markings on the rachises and stem reflecting the sclerotic tissue in the cortex.

Genus	Cortical sclerotic tissue in rachises	Pinnae below main dichotomy of rachis	Division of main rachis	Pinnule form
Lyginopteris	Anastomosed	Yes	Bipartite	Small, angular or rounded lobes
Eusphenopteris	Transverse	Yes	Bipartite	Robust, rounded lobes
Diplothmema	Transverse	No	Bipartite	Robust, digitate lobes
Palmatopteris	Transverse	Yes	Quadripartite	Robust, ± digitate lobes
Karinopteris	Transverse	Yes	Bipartite	Robust, shallow rounded or angular lobes
Mariopteris	Transverse	Yes	Quadripartite	Robust, shallow rounded lobes

== Classification ==
There is no consensus on the division of the Lyginopteridales into families, either in terms of whole organisms or as fossil families of particular plant organs. The most recent scheme, by Anderson et al. (2007) recognized 5 families based on ovulate structures. Some authors also recognise the Mariopteridaceae for the distinctive group of Pennsylvanian-aged lianescent plants with Mariopteris fronds, although details of their reproductive structures are unknown.
