= Zagaje Formation =

Geologic formation in Poland and Germany

- Stratigraphic range: Rhaetian-Sinemurian~202–196 Ma
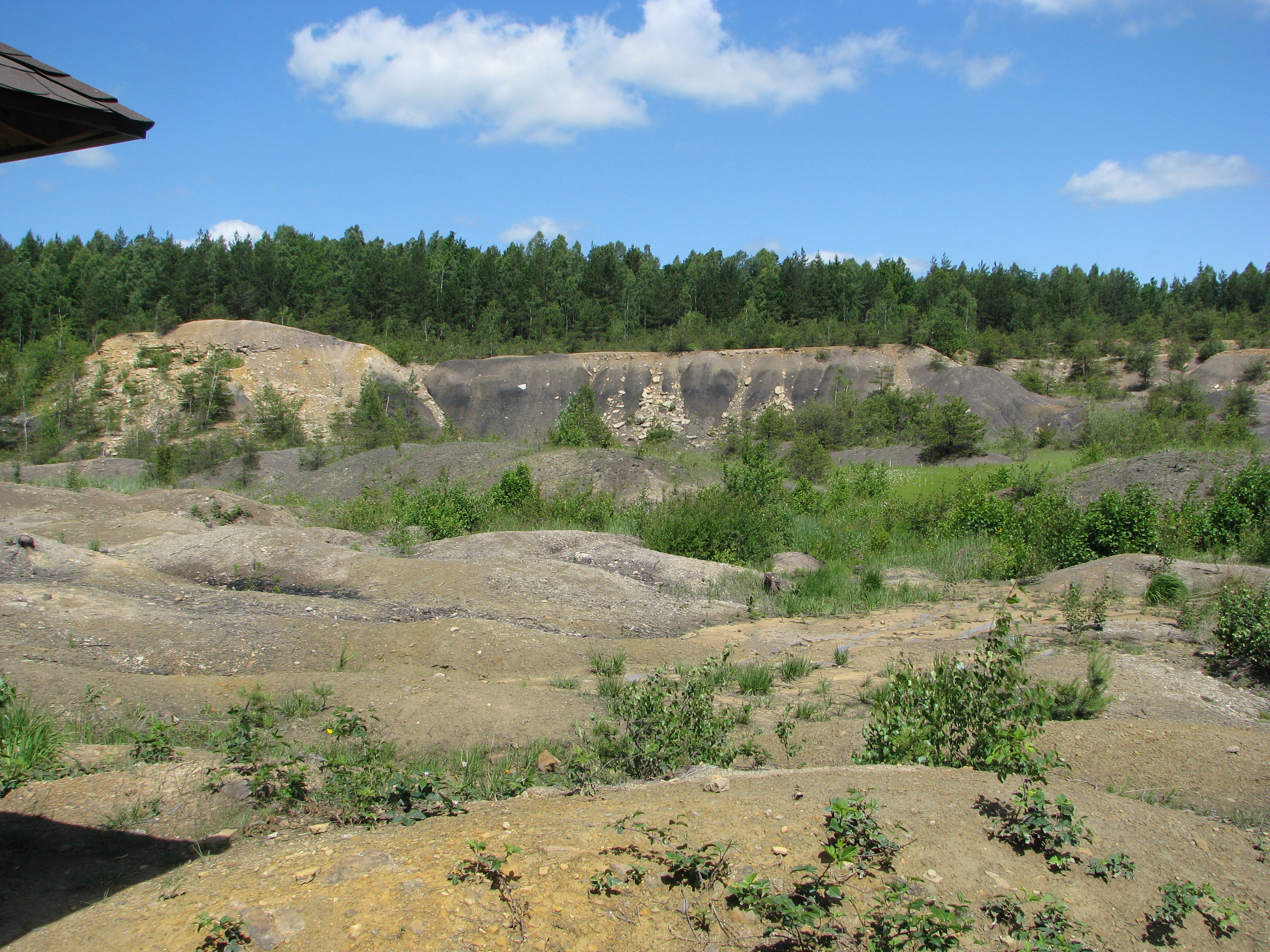
- Exposed Layers at Sołtyków
- Type: Geological formation
- Unit of: Kamienna Group
- Sub-units: Huta Mudstone Member
- Underlies: Przysucha Formation; Ostrowiec Formation
- Overlies: Unnamed Rhaetian Beds
- Area: Polish epicontinental basin except of the Mazury region and Czêstochowa region. Reaches also into north Germany
- Thickness: 157.5 m

Lithology
- Primary: Sandstone
- Other: Mudstone

Location
- Coordinates: 51.1°N 20.5°E
- Approximate paleocoordinates: 43.1°N 18.8°E
- Region: Swietokrzyskie
- Country: Poland, Germany

Type section
- Named for: The Town of Zagaje near Gromadzice
- Named by: Karaszewski (as an informal unit)
- Zagaje Formation (Poland)

The Zagaje Formation is a Latest Triassic-Early Jurassic Epoch (Rhaetian-Sinemurian) geologic formation located mostly in Poland with layers also exposed in north Germany. This unit is known for its diverse Ichnofossil assemblages, with traces of invertebrates along vertebrate footprints, as well plants, large coal accumulations, invertebrate remains and ichnofossils. The Zagaje Formation correlates with The lower part of the Höganäs Formation in Scania, as well the Munkerup Member and the Gassum Formation in Denmark.

== Paleoenvironment ==
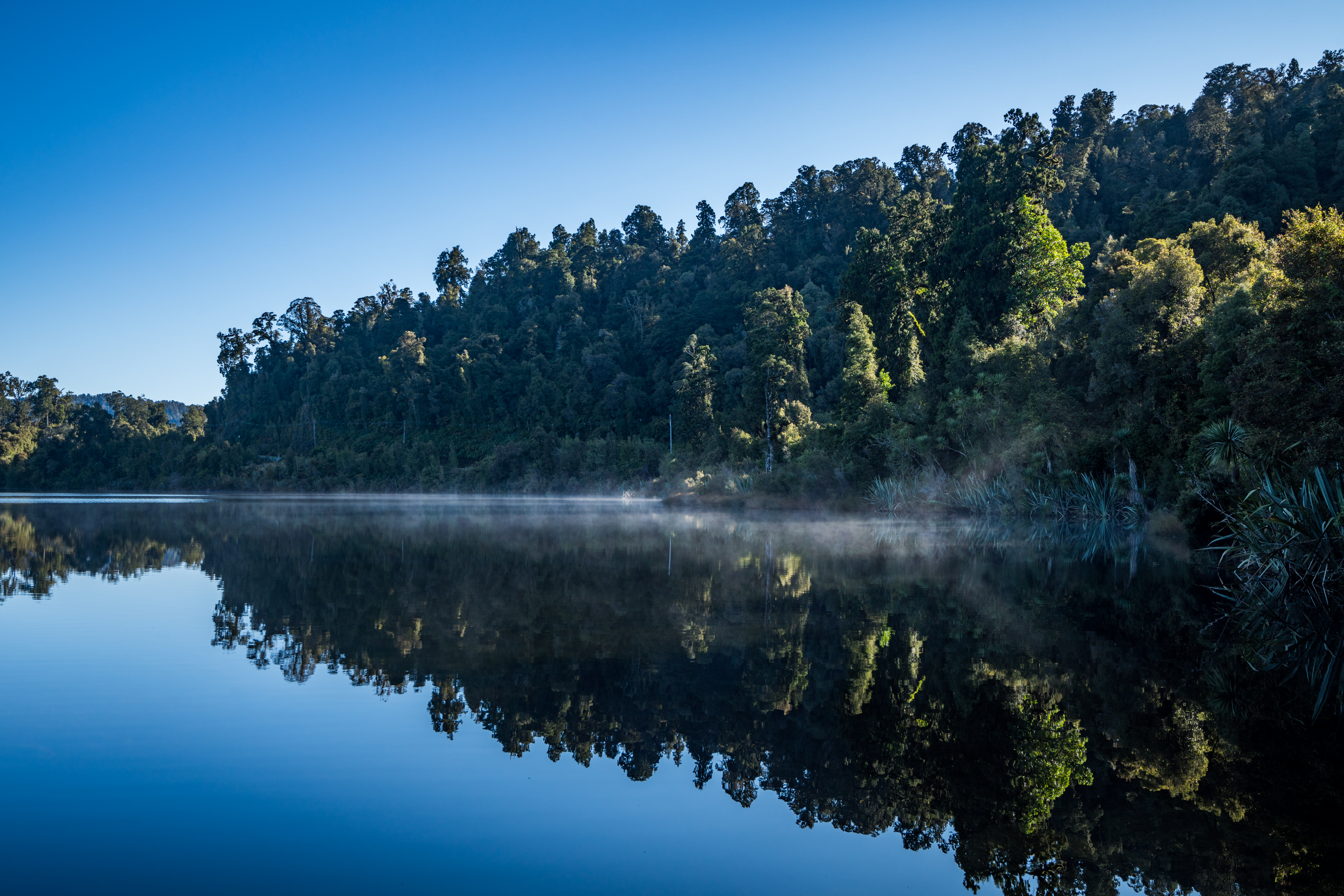
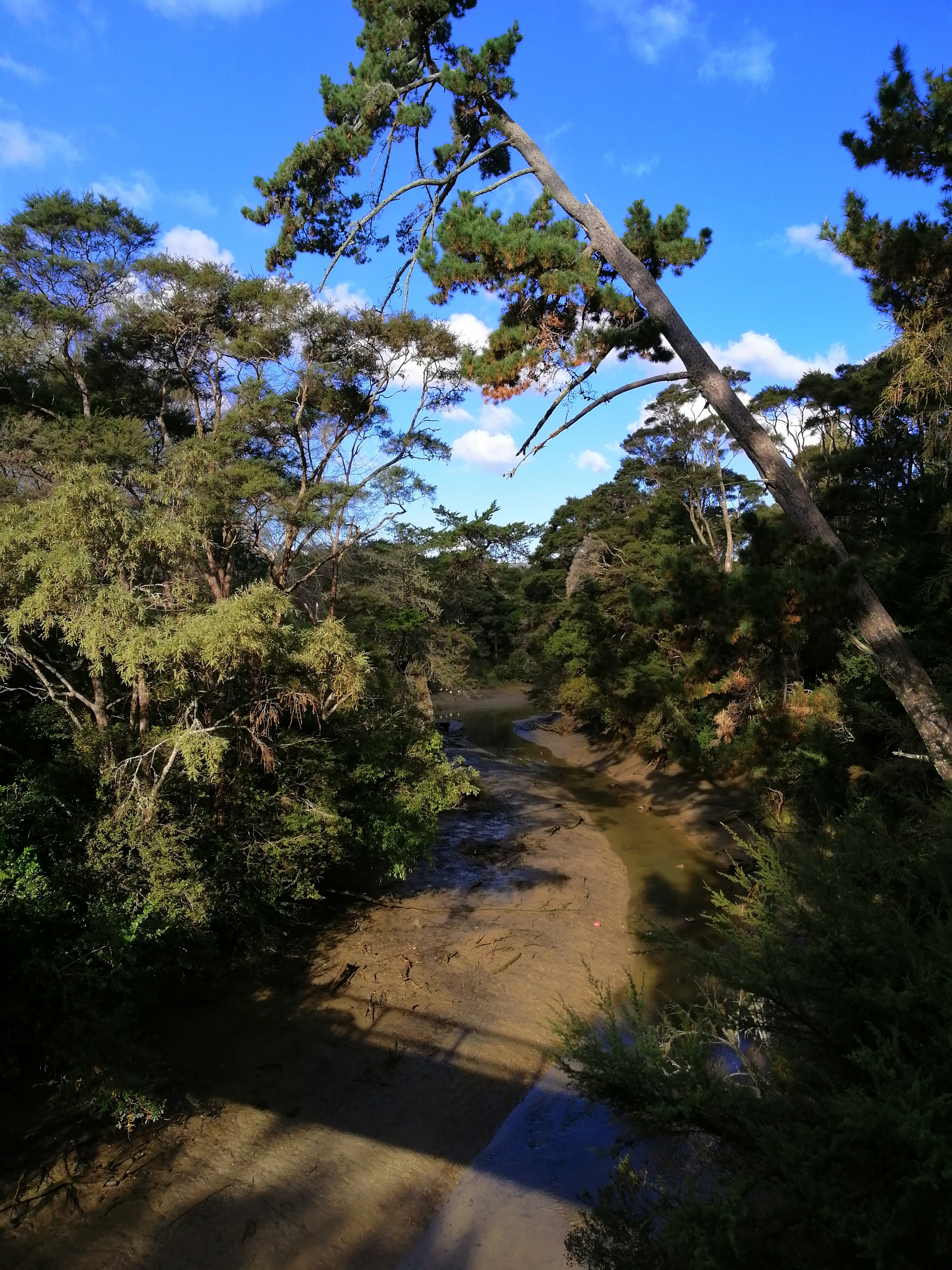
The Zagaje Formation is a mostly continental unit, with riverine and lacustrine sediments (Modern equivalent examples include Lake Wahapo and Lucas Creek in New Zealand)

The Zagaje Formation is particularly visible in the Sołtyków region and is made mostly of Early Jurassic continental mudstone-sandstone deposits linked to the onset of "depositional sequence I". Its age is confirmed as mostly Early Hettangian through stratigraphic and paleontological analyses, including fossil flora and conchostraca findings. Sedimentological studies divide the Sołtyków profile into three parts: ephemeral reservoir deposits, floodplain and lacustrine sediments, and river channel deposits, highlighting dynamic depositional environments influenced by tectonic subsidence and varying hydrological conditions.

Climate wise, the area was located back in the Hettangian around 45°N paleolatitude in Laurasia within a rise of 5–10 °C above present, where it experienced significant climatic and environmental change related with sea-level fluctuations, manifested locally with a notorious retrogradational fluvial-lacustrine sedimentation, with evidence of a humid climate interspersed with drier seasons. Some plant fossils like Hirmeriella mark points of aridity on what was mostly a humid swampy alluvial-lacustrine habitat.

The Zagaje Formation's deposits are known from both outcrops and borehole profiles that consist primarily of sandstones, mudstones, and interspersed coal and siderite layers. It represents a stratigraphic gap with the underlying Upper Triassic formations and is capped by a transgressive contact with the Skłoby Formation. This unit contains freshwater fauna and diverse trace fossils, including vertebrate tracks. The paleoenvironment reflects a dynamic alluvial plain shaped predominantly by high-sinuosity stream processes, transitioning from earlier braided and low-sinuosity stream systems. This evolution is attributed to climatic changes, rising base levels, and decreasing geomorphological gradients. Observations, both from exposures and borehole data, highlight the dominance of avulsion processes, with several depositional subsystems identified. Facies with organic remains are diverse: riverbed biofacies, derived from meandering channels characterized by fining-upward sequences composed of channel lag deposits, point-bar sands, and finer overlying sediments. These deposits exhibit lateral accretion bedding and significant fossil bivalves and large-sized floated plant remains (stems and trunks of large plants) consistent with subaqueous dune migration within the channels; levee deposits derived from successive floods with scarce root traces, while plant remnants are common; Paleosoils with sparse traces of plant roots and remains of floating plants of highly variable size (mainly organic detritus, but also fragments of wood), fragments of bivalve shells and vertebrate remains (amniote bones, tracks, fish scales); the biofacies of the ephemeral water reservoir with plant remains, mainly horsetails, and fossils of insects, ostracods, and conchostraca; The pedogenic soil biofacies with remains of plant roots with preserved organic matter and rhizomes and stems in a living position; Floodplain biofacies with traces of numerous plant roots and plant macroremains, and remains of sedge stems preserved in a living position; Lake-marsh biofacies, dark, laminated mudstones with plant roots and coal, with few fossil bivalves, a large amount of organic matter in the form of plant detritus, and layers of coal and numerous finds of miospores and megaspores. The local presence of charcoal fragments and high concentrations of PAHs, along with possible burnt plants, provides evidence for wildfires in the region, that likely occurred near the surface with charred wood fragments were subsequently incorporated into sediments by river transport.

The high presence of coprolites has allow also to establish the tropic chain of the local biota, with a clear full ecosystemical substitution of the older Triassic archosaurs by Dinosaurs.

== Biota ==
=== Indet. Invertebrates ===
Several unname Ichnofossils are recovered at Soltyków, including conical domichnia (Conichnus?), bivalve straight to winding linear trails, smooth vertical and subvertical branching tunnels, knob-walled tunnels, mace-shaped or irregular ellipsoid chambers, etc.

Genus	Species	Location	Material	Made By
Cruziana	C. problematica; cf.C. isp	Soltyków	Dwelling structures	Annelids; Insect larvae; Nematodes
Cochlichnus	C. isp.	Gromadzice; Kontrewers; Odrowaz; Soltyków	Traces	Annelids; Insect larvae; Nematodes
Conichnus	C. isp.	Gromadzice; Kontrewers; Odrowaz; Soltyków	Subcylindrical burrows	Annelids; Nematodes; Crustaceans
Diplichnites	D. isp.	Soltyków	Hypichnial trackway	Insects; Myriapods; Arachnids
Diplocraterion	D. parallelum	Gromadzice; Kontrewers; Odrowaz; Soltyków	U-Shaped Burrows	Crustaceans; Annelids; Phoronidans; Insects; Fish
Imbrichnus	I. isp.	Gromadzice; Kontrewers; Odrowaz; Soltyków	Burrows	Annelids; Bivalves; Crustaceans
Kouphichnium	cf. K. isp.	Soltyków	V-shaped hypichnial marks	Xiphosura; Malacostraca
Palaeophycus	P. isp.	Soltyków	Straight or slightly curved burrows	Annelids; Bivalves; Crustaceans
Planolites	P. isp.	Soltyków	Horizontal burrows	Annelids; Bivalves; Crustaceans
Rusophycus	R. isp.	Soltyków	Resting Traces	Resting traces of arthropods
Scolicia	S. isp.	Gromadzice; Kontrewers; Odrowaz; Soltyków	Moving Traces	Locomotion trace of gastropods
Scoyenia	S. isp.	Soltyków	Linear slender burrows	Beetles?
Skolithos	S. isp.	Gromadzice; Kontrewers; Odrowaz; Soltyków	Sac/Bottle shaped burrows	Annelids; Crustaceans; Insects
Spongeliomorpha	S. carlsbergi; S. isp.	Gromadzice; Kontrewers; Odrowaz; Soltyków	Sac/Bottle shaped burrows	Annelids; Crustaceans; Insects

=== Molluscs ===
Indeterminate gastropod egg capsules are known, similar to the ones recovered in the extant Neritina. 4 unnamed morphotypes of freshwater bivalves of the family Unionidae are known.

Genus	Species	Location	Material	Notes	Images
Anodonta	A. liasokeuperina	Soltyków	Isolated Shells	A freshwater mussel, member of the family Unionidae	Example of extant specimen of Anodonta
Calceoformites	C. uchmani	Soltyków	Clog-shaped protrusions	Bivalve estabilization traces	
Cardinia	C. follini; C. inglensis; C. cf.kullensis	Gromadzice; Odrowaz; Podole; Soltyków	Isolated Shells	A Carditidae Bivalve. Indicator of oligohaline settings and found also on the younger Skłoby Formation	
Lockeia	L. siliquaria; L. amygdaloides; L. czarnockii	Gromadzice; Kontrewers; Odrowaz; Soltyków	Dwelling traces	Resting traces of Bivalves	Devonian Specimens
Ptychoplasma	P. conica	Soltyków	Locomotion trace	Gastropod Locomotion traces	
Scalichnus	S. phiale; S. isp.	Gromadzice; Kontrewers; Odrowaz; Soltyków	Sac/Bottle shaped burrows	Escape structure of mud-dwelling bivalves	
Scolicia	S. isp.	Gromadzice; Kontrewers; Odrowaz; Soltyków	Traces	Locomotion and feeding trace of gastropods	
Unio	U. minutus	Soltyków	Isolated Shells	A freshwater mussel, member of the family Unionidae	Example of extant specimen of Unio
Viviparus	V. spp.	Soltyków	Isolated Shells	A freshwater snail, member of the family Viviparidae	Example of extant specimen of Viviparus

=== Crustacea ===
Genus	Species	Stratigraphic position	Material	Notes	Images
Bulbilimnadia	B. kilianorum	Hucisko; Soltyków	Valves	A freshwater Ostracodan of the family Bulbilimnadiidae	
Darwinula	D. sarytirmenensis; D. spp.	Gromadzice; Hucisko; Odrowaz; Soltyków	Valves	A freshwater Ostracodan of the family Darwinulidae	Example of Darwinula specimens
Euestheria	E. opalina; E. loczyi; E. brodieana; E. minuta; Euestheria sp.	Gromadzice; Hucisko; Kontrewers; Odrowaz; Soltyków	Valves	A Freshwater Clam shrimp (Phyllopodan) of the family Lioestheriidae.	
Isopodichnus	I. isp.	Gromadzice; Kontrewers; Odrowaz; Soltyków	Hypichnial marks	Feeding and moving traces of phyllopod and notostracan crustaceans	

=== Insects ===
Radial chambers around large tunnels have been recovered, they may be arthropod burrows or traces of roots. Large nest structures with septa, similar to nesting behaviour of insects like Cicadas are known.

Genus	Species	Location	Material	Notes	Images
Artematopodites	A. ssp.	Odrowaz	MPK 5/36, 39, 40	A Coleopteran, member of the family Permosynidae	
Blattodea indet.	Indeterminate	Odrowaz	MPK 5/54	Indeterminate Blattodean remains	
Blattulidae indet.	Indeterminate	Odrowaz	MPK 5/1	Indeterminate Cockroach remains	
Caraboidea indet.	Indeterminate	Odrowaz	MPK 5/12, 15	Indeterminate Beetle remains	
Coleoptera indet.	Indeterminate	Odrowaz	Isolated Wings	Indeterminate Beetle remains	
Helminthoidichnites	cf. H. isp.	Sołtyków	Gnawing traces	surficial gnawing traces made by insects	
Hydrobiites	H. sp.	Odrowaz	MPK 5/10, 13, 17, 22, 25, 33	A Coleopteran, member of the family Permosynidae	
Linckichnus	L. terebrans	Sołtyków	Boring Traces	Detritivorous habitation dwellings or oviposition structures of insects in dead wood	
Memptus	M. sp.	Odrowaz	MPK 5/44	A Coleopteran, Incertade sedis	
Notocupes	N. sp.	Odrowaz	MPK 5/6	A Coleopteran, Incertade sedis	
Odrowazicoris	O. polonicus	Odrowaz	MPK 5/2	A Hemipteran, member of the family Belostomatidae	
Polysitum	P.? sp.	Odrowaz	MPK 5/14, 29	A Coleopteran, Incertade sedis	
Phoroschizidae indet.	Indeterminate	Odrowaz	MPK 5/4,5, 8, 20, 35	Indeterminate Beetle remains	
Xylonichnus	Cf.X. isp.	Sołtyków	Boring Traces	Borings in the wood made probably by insect larvae	

=== Fish ===
Unidentified Actinopterygian fish scales and teeth were collected from clayish, organic-rich lake deposits, while some coprolites have been referred to Hybodontiform sharks.

Genus	Species	Location	Material	Notes	Images
Semionotus	S. cf. bergeri	Czarniecka Góra	Single specimen	A Semionotiform bony fish of the family Semionotidae	Life restoration
Paleoniscidae indet.	Indeterminate	Sołtyków	Scales & Teeth	Indeterminate Palaeonisciformes specimens	

=== Testudinata ===
Genus	Species	Location	Material	Notes	Images
Chelonipus	C. isp.	Sołtyków	Footprints	Turtle Tracks	
Testudinata indet.	Indeterminate	Sołtyków	Carapace Fragments	Unidentified Turtle remains, quoted to belong to a large sized taxon	

=== Synapsids ===
Genus	Species	Location	Material	Notes	Images
Ameghinichnus	Cf.A. isp.	Sołtyków	Footprints	Small Synapsid tracks, likely from Mammaliaformes	A genus similar to Morganucodon is most probably the best candidate for the local Brasilichnium footprints
Brasilichnium	B. isp.	Sołtyków	Footprints	Small Synapsid tracks, likely from Mammaliaformes	A genus similar to Morganucodon is most probably the best candidate for the local Brasilichnium footprints
Dicynodontipus	D. isp.	Sołtyków	Footprints	Tracks referred to Eucynodonts, maybe Tritylodontidae	A genus similar to Tritylodon is most probably the best candidate for the local Dicynodontipus & Therapsipus footprints
Therapsipus	Cf.T. isp.	Sołtyków	Footprints	Tracks referred to Eucynodonts	A genus similar to Tritylodon is most probably the best candidate for the local Dicynodontipus & Therapsipus footprints

=== Rhynchocephalia ===
Genus	Species	Location	Material	Notes	Images
Rhynchosauroides	R. isp.	Sołtyków	Footprints	Tracks referable to both Sphenodontidae and Lepidosauromorpha	A small taxon coeval in age like Gephyrosaurus is a good reference for the local Rhynchosauroides tracks

=== Crocodrylomorphs ===
Genus	Species	Location	Material	Notes	Images
Batrachopus	B. isp.	Sołtyków	Footprints	Crocodrylomorph Tracks, likely of terrestrial taxa	Terrestrial crocodylomorphs such as Dibothrosuchus, were most likely the Batrachopus trackmakers.
Crocodylomorpha indet.	Indeterminate	Sołtyków	Bones inside a large bromalite	An Indeterminate Crocodrylomorph, likely preyed on by a large Theropod	
Crocodylomorpha indet.	Indeterminate	Sołtyków	Footprints	Unnamed 3rd type of Footprint	
Malutitetrapodiscus	Cf.M. isp.	Sołtyków	Footprints	Probably left by small terrestrial crocodylomorphs	Terrestrial crocodylomorphs such as Stegomosuchus, were most likely the Malutitetrapodiscus trackmakers.

=== Pterosauria ===
Genus	Species	Location	Material	Notes	Images
Pteraichnus	cf. P. isp.	Sołtyków	Footprints	Pterosaur Tracks, the individuals that left them probably had a wingspan of about 30–40 cm	A small taxon coeval in age like Dimorphodon is a good reference for the local Pteraichnus tracks

=== Theropods ===
Some elliptical "post-egg" structures egshells & eggs with embryo remains have been referred to theropods, yet may also belong to Ornithischians.

Genus	Species	Location	Material	Notes	Images
Anchisauripus	A. ispp.; Cf.A. isp.	Sołtyków	Footprints	Adscribed to smal slender primitive predatory dinosaurs, related with genera such as Coelophysis	Anchisauripus may belong to a genus similar to Procompsognathus
Eubrontes	E. isp.; Cf.E. isp.	Sołtyków	Footprints	Eubrontes is related to the Genus Dilophosaurus, representing a basal Neotheropods	Oudated Dilophosaurus model nicknamed "Dyzio", who was done in honor of the Zagaje Finds
Grallator	G. ispp.; Cf.G. isp.	Sołtyków	Footprints	Similar pes with Coelophysidae-alike dinosaurs, related with neotheropods such as Dracoraptor.	Grallator footprints may belong to a genus similar to Dracoraptor
Kayentapus	K. soltykovensis; K. ispp.; Cf.K. isp.	Sołtyków	Footprints	Assumed to come from Genera similar to Sarcosaurus	Kayentapus footprints may belong to a genus similar to Sarcosaurus
Megalosauripus	Cf.M. isp.	Sołtyków	Footprints	Large bodied taxa, maybe related with Sinosaurus. Among the largest early Jurassic theropod tracks worldwide.	Megalosauripus footprints can belong to a large relative of Sinosaurus or regional taxa such as Dornraptor
Plesiornis	cf. P. isp.	Sołtyków	Footprints	Theropod Tracks from small sized taxa with convergent features with latter Avians	
Stenonyx	Cf.S. isp.	Sołtyków	Footprints	Small Theropod tracks, likely from juveniles of larger taxa	
Theropoda indet.	Indeterminate	Hucisko; Sołtyków	Teeth; Isolated Bones; Bromalites	Some coprolites, referred to Theropods include plant material, probably ingested accidentally by drinking water. Others include large bone remains or fish scales. Teeth corroborate the presence of large taxa in the area.	

=== Sauropodomorpha ===
Genus	Species	Location	Material	Notes	Images
Kalosauropus	K. pollex	Gromadzice	Footprints	Tracks referred to early quadrupedal or semibipedal sauropodomorphs	Local Kalosauropus resemble the feet of the genus Massospondylus
Megaloolithidae? indet.	Indeterminate	Sołtyków	Eggshells, eggs with embryo remains & spherical "post-egg" structures	Nesting structures & associated eggs referred to sauropods	Example of Megaloolithus, a fossil Sauropod egg
Otozoum	Cf.O. isp.	Sołtyków	Footprints	Tracks referred to early quadrupedal or semibipedal sauropodomorphs	
Parabrontopodus	P. isp.	Sołtyków	Footprints	Sauropod tracks, usually referred to taxa similar to Vulcanodon	Vulcanodon was used as a potential reference for Parabrontopodus
Sauropodomorpha indet.	Indeterminate	Hucisko	Isolated bones; Bromalites	Indeterminate Sauropodomorph bones	
Tetrasauropus	Cf.T. isp	Sołtyków	Footprints	Tracks referred to early quadrupedal or semibipedal sauropodomorphs	Local Tetrasauropus resemble the feet of the genus Aardonyx

=== Ornithischia ===
Genus	Species	Location	Material	Notes	Images
Anomoepus	A. scambus; A. ispp.; Cf.A. isp.	Sołtyków; Gromadzice	Footprints	Tracks that resemble the feet of "Stormbergia" and various Genasauria of different sizes	"Stormbergia"´s feet matches with the Anomoepus tracks
Delatorrichnus	D. isp.	Sołtyków	Footprints	Tracks usually referred to Heterodontosauridae or similar taxa	Heterodontosaurus's feet matches with the Delatorrichnus tracks
Moyenisauropus	M. karaszevskii; M. isp.; Cf.M. isp.	Kontrewers	Footprints	Tracks adscribed to basal Thyreophora, vinculated with genera such as Scelidosaurus	Scelidosaurus feet matches with the Moyenisauropus trackmaker

=== Plants ===
In Palynology, the Zagaje Formation belongs to the Nathorstisporites hopliticus assemblage (Isoetales), indicating a spike in marshland and lacustrine settings. The Sołtyków outcrop is dominated by Classopollis (Cheirolepidiaceae), Aratrisporites (Cycadidae), Concavisporites (Dipteridaceae) and Cyathidites (Cyatheaceae).

Genus	Species	Stratigraphic position	Material	Notes	Images
Aciphyllum	A. triangulatum	Sołtyków	Cuticles	Affinities with Pinaceae inside Pinales. The oldest record of a Pinus-like needle in the fossil record	
Brachyphyllum	B. sp.	Sołtyków	Cuticles	Affinities with Cheirolepidiaceae or Araucariaceae inside Pinales	Brachyphyllum specimen
Caytonia	C. sp.	Odrowąż; Sołtyków	Reproductive structure	Affinities with Caytoniaceae in the Caytoniales	
Czekanowskia	C. sp.	Hucisko	Branched Shoots	Affinities with the Czekanowskiales inside Ginkgoopsida. This Genus is related with relatively drier-cooler conditions.	
Desmiophyllum	D. harrisii	Sołtyków	Cuticles	A possible Conifer leaf, recent finds of it associated with the cone genera Sphaerostrobus and Ourostrobus points to a coniferophyte affinity, maybe as a member of Palissyaceae.	
Dictyophyllum	D. sp.	Odrowąż; Sołtyków	Pinnae	Affinities with Dipteridaceae inside Gleicheniales.	Dictyophyllum specimen
Goepertella	G. microloba	Odrowąż; Sołtyków	Pinnae	Affinities with Dipteridaceae inside Gleicheniales	
Hirmeriella	H. muensteri	Hucisko; Odrowąż	Branched Shoots and reproductive cones	Affinities with the Cheirolepidiaceae inside Pinales.	
Komlopteris	K. distinctiva	Odrowąż; Sołtyków	Cuticles	Affinities Corystospermaceae inside Corystospermales.	
Matonia	M. braunii	Niekłań PGI-1	Pinnae	Affinities with Matoniaceae inside Gleicheniales	
Neocalamites	N. lehmannianus	Sołtyków	Stems	Affinities with Calamitaceae inside Equisetopsida. A common horsetail on the Liassic of Europe.	Neocalamites specimens
Nilssonia	N. sp.	Sołtyków	Cuticles	Affinities with Cycadeoidaceae in the Bennettitales or alternatively a member of Nilssoniales	Nilssonia specimen
Odrolepis	O. liassica	Odrowąż; Sołtyków	Complete Plants	Affinities with Lycopodiales	
Otozamites	O. brevifolius	Odrowąż; Sołtyków	Leaflets	Affinities with Williamsoniaceae in the Bennettitales.	Otozamites specimen
Pachypteris	P. lanceolata; P. papillosa	Odrowąż; Sołtyków	Pinnae	Affinities Corystospermaceae inside Corystospermales.	
Paracycas	P. minuta	Odrowąż; Sołtyków	Leaflets	Affinities with Cycadales in the Cycadopsida.	
Piroconites	P. kuespertii	Odrowąż; Sołtyków	Reproductive structure	Affinities with Gnetales, maybe with Welwitschiaceae	
Phlebopteris	P. angustiloba	Odrowąż; Sołtyków	Cuticles	Affinities with Matoniaceae in the Gleicheniales.	Phlebopteris specimen
Podozamites	P. cf. schenkii; P. sp.; Cf. P. sp.	Sołtyków	Branched shoots	Affinities with Krassiloviaceae inside Voltziales	Podozamites reconstruction
Pseudotorellia	Cf.P. sp.	Sołtyków	Cuticles	Affinities with the Pseudotorelliaceae inside Ginkgoopsida.	
Pterophyllum	P. sp.; Cf.P. sp.	Odrowąż; Sołtyków	Leaflets	Affinities with Williamsoniaceae in the Bennettitales.	Pterophyllum specimen
Ptilozamites	P. cycadea	Sołtyków	Cuticles	Affinities Corystospermaceae inside Corystospermales.	
Sagenopteris	S. nilssoniana	Odrowąż; Sołtyków	Leaves	Affinities with Caytoniaceae in the Caytoniales	Sagenopteris specimen
Schmeissneria	S. microstachys	Odrowąż; Sołtyków	Reproductive structure	Affinities with Ginkgoopsida or with Angiosperm-convergent Gimnosperms	
Swedenborgia	S. sp.	Sołtyków	Branched Shoots	Affinities with Krassiloviaceae inside Voltziales.	Swedenborgia specimens
Thaumatopteris	T. brauniana	Hucisko; Odrowąż	Pinnae	Affinities with Dipteridaceae inside Gleicheniales	
Todites	T. princeps	Hucisko; Odrowąż	Pinnae	Affinities with Osmundaceae in the Osmundales.	

== See also ==
- List of stratigraphic units with indeterminate ornithischian tracks
- Blue Lias, England
- Charmouth Mudstone Formation, England
- Sorthat Formation, Denmark
- Hasle Formation, Denmark
- Drzewica Formation, Poland
- Ciechocinek Formation, Poland
- Borucice Formation, Poland
- Rotzo Formation, Italy
- Saltrio Formation, Italy
- Moltrasio Formation, Italy
- Marne di Monte Serrone, Italy
- Calcare di Sogno, Italy
- Podpeč Limestone, Slovenia
- Coimbra Formation, Portugal
- El Pedregal Formation, Spain
- Fernie Formation, Canada
- Whiteaves Formation, British Columbia
- Navajo Sandstone, Utah
- Aganane Formation, Morocco
- Tafraout Group, Morocco
- Azilal Formation, Morocco
- Budoš Limestone, Montenegro
- Kota Formation, India
- Cañadón Asfalto Formation, Argentina
- Los Molles Formation, Argentina
- Kandreho Formation, Madagascar
- Elliot Formation, South Africa
- Clarens Formation, South Africa
- Evergreen Formation, Australia
- Cattamarra Coal Measures, Australia
- Hanson Formation, Antarctica
- Mawson Formation, Antarctica
