= Caytonanthus =

Caytonanthus Temporal range: Jurassic

Scientific classification
- Kingdom: Plantae
- Clade: Tracheophytes
- Division: †Pteridospermatophyta
- Order: †Caytoniales
- Family: †Caytoniaceae
- Genus: †Caytonanthus; Harris, 1937

Species
- †Caytonanthus arberi Thomas 1925

Synonyms
- †Antholithus Thomas, 1925

Genus of seed ferns

Caytonanthus is an extinct genus of seed ferns.

== Description ==
Caytonanthus is the polliniferous organ-genus of the Caytoniales, and it is often found along Sagenopteris and Caytonia. Caytonanthus remains have been found in Greenland, UK, Hungary Russia, Poland, India, Antarctica and Argentina. Caytonanthus has simple or multiple orders of branches arrayed along axes, each terminal branch bears one or many synangia, each composed by four, partially fused, pollen sacs.
