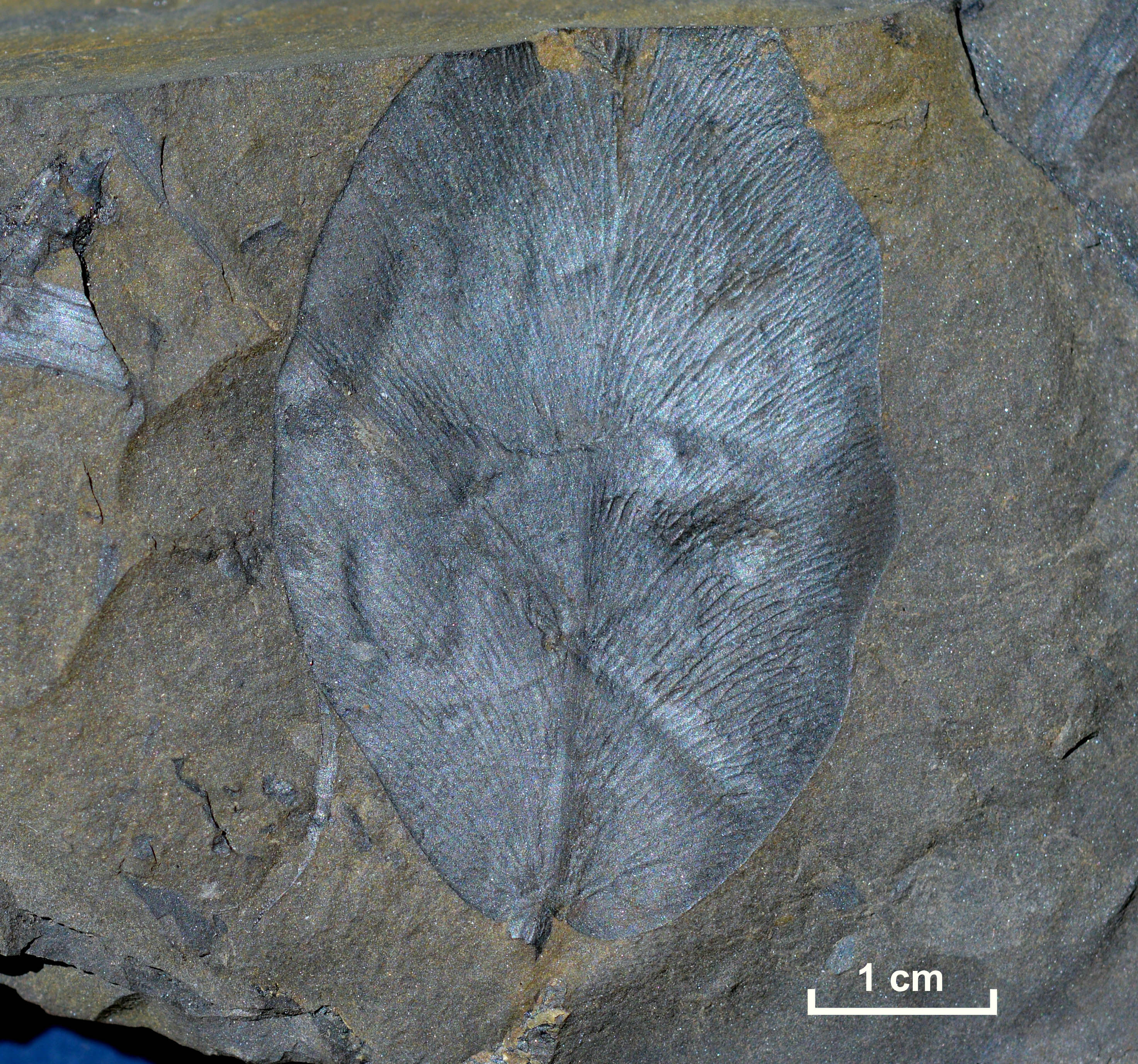
- Sagenopteris williamsii leaflet from the Early Cretaceous Grande Cache Member of the Gates Formation near Grande Cache, Alberta

Scientific classification
- Kingdom: Plantae
- Clade: Embryophytes
- Clade: Tracheophytes
- Division: †Pteridospermatophyta
- Order: †Caytoniales
- Family: †Caytoniaceae
- Genus: †Sagenopteris
- Species: †S. williamsii

Binomial name
- †Sagenopteris williamsii (Newberry) W.A. Bell

= Sagenopteris williamsii =

Sagenopteris williamsii Temporal range: Late Jurassic-Early Cretaceous ~157–100 Ma

Extinct genus of seed ferns

Sagenopteris williamsii is an extinct pteridosperm (seed fern) that is known from the late Jurassic and Early Cretaceous strata of the western interior of North America. It was first described as Chiropteris williamsii by J.S. Newberry in 1891, based on specimens from the Great Falls coal field in Montana. In 1956, it was referred to as Sagenopteris by W.A. Bell based on additional specimens from western Canada.

== Description ==
Sagenopteris williamsii had four or more palmately arranged, ovate to obovate leaves, each up to 10 cm long and 10 cm wide. They had a petiole, anastomosing venation, and a midvein that thinned toward the apex.

== Distribution and age ==
Leaves of S. williamsii have been reported (as Chiropteris williamsii) from the late Jurassic strata of the Morrison Formation in western Montana. In Canada, they are known from the Jurassic Hazelton Group of north-central British Columbia, the Early Cretaceous Blairmore and Luscar Groups of western Alberta, and the Early Cretaceous Bullhead Group of northeastern British Columbia.
