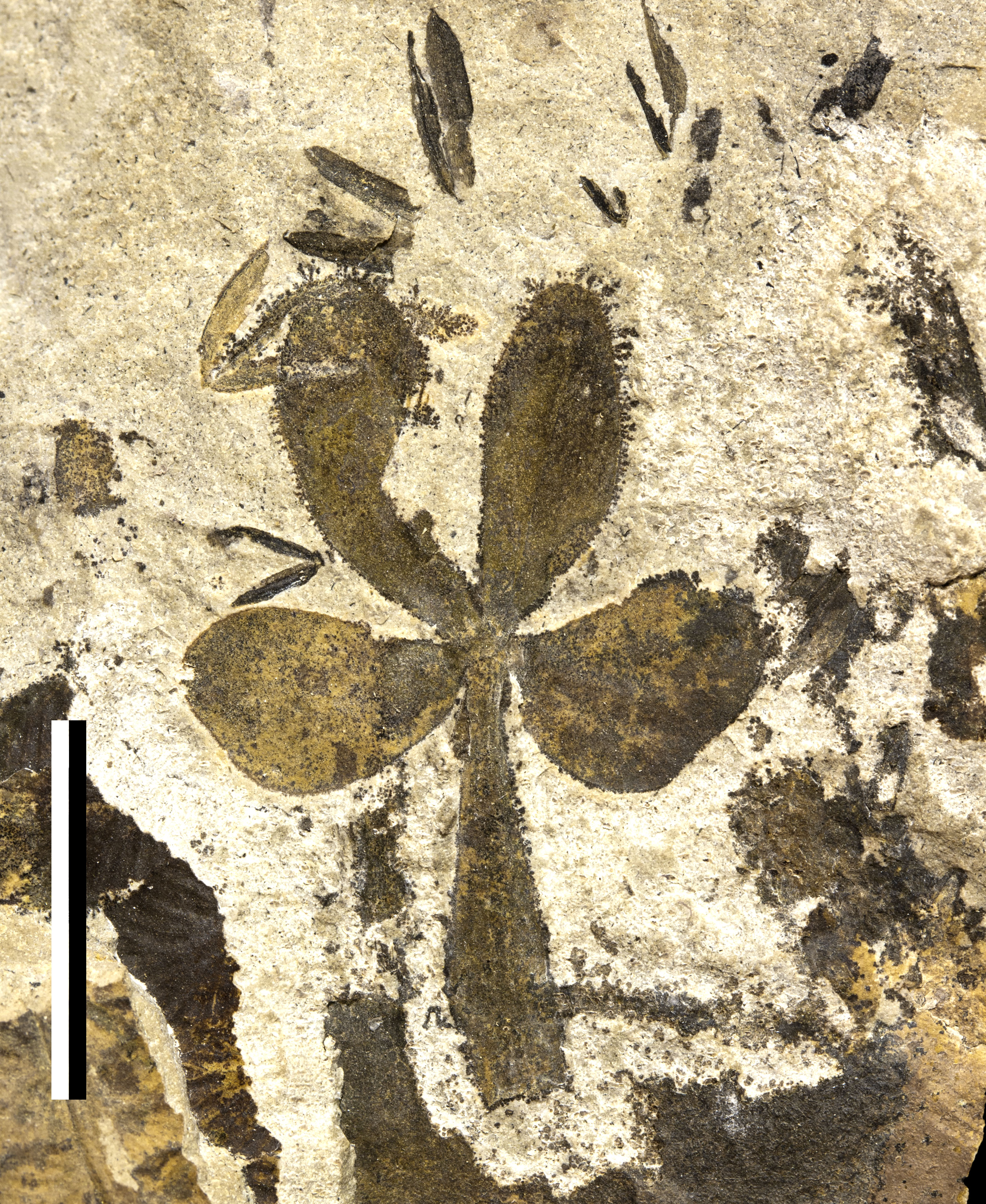
- Complete Sagenopteris trapialensis leaf, venation obscured

Scientific classification
- Kingdom: Plantae
- Clade: Tracheophytes
- Division: †Pteridospermatophyta
- Order: †Caytoniales
- Family: †Caytoniaceae
- Genus: †Sagenopteris
- Species: †S. trapialensis

Binomial name
- †Sagenopteris trapialensis Elgorriaga, Escapa et Cuneo, 2019

= Sagenopteris trapialensis =

Sagenopteris trapialensis Temporal range: Early Jurassic

Extinct species of seed ferns

Sagenopteris trapialensis are leaves of extinct species of seed fern from Chubut, Patagonia Argentina. At the moment, S. trapialensis is based on impression fossils found in the Early Jurassic Lonco Trapial Formation near Paso del Sapo, Chubut Province.

== Description ==
Sagenopteris trapialensis comprises palmately arranged leaves with 4 ovate to obovate leaflets with anastomosing venation. The central leaflets are almost symmetrical, whereas the lateral ones are markedly asymmetrical. Various types of anastomoses are present, and dichotomies are simple. Leaves of various sizes and forms were found, ranging from less than 5 mm. and up to 80 mm long.
