= West Gold Hill dinosaur tracksite =

Tracksite near Ouray, Colorado, US

Coordinates: 38°01′41″N 107°40′56″W

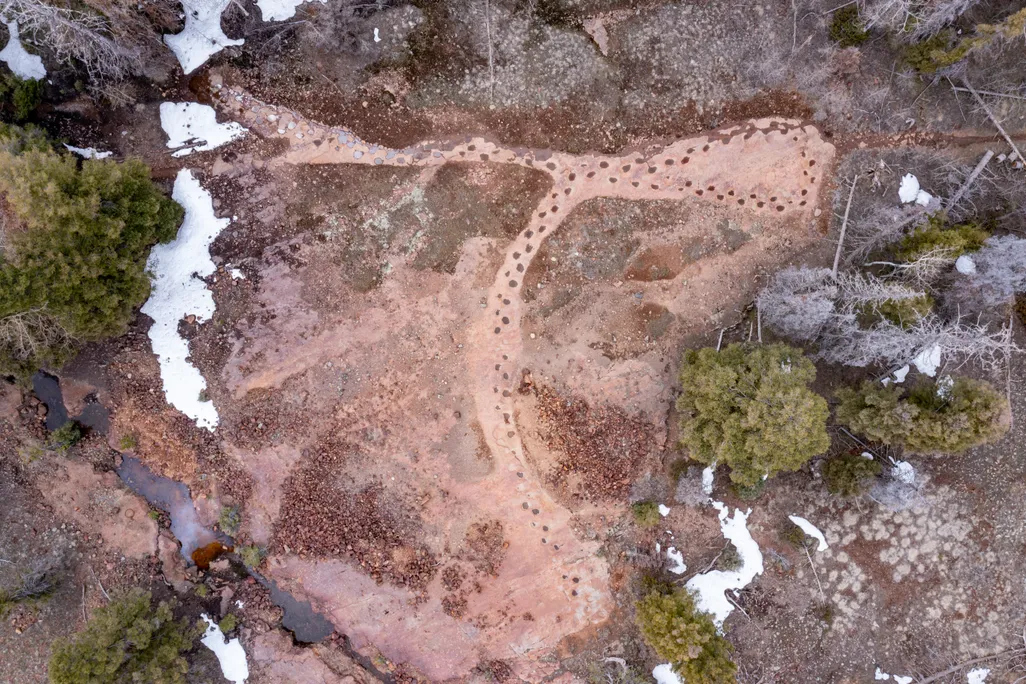
Aerial photograph of the site, viewed towards the west

The West Gold Hill Dinosaur Tracksite preserves an exceptionally long fossil trackway of a sauropod dinosaur that makes a tight turn and crosses its own path. The site is located high in the Rocky Mountains, at an altitude of about 2,835 m (9,301 ft), near Ouray, Colorado, United States. The tracks are preserved in a very resistant sandstone layer that is probably part of the Bluff Formation and probably dates to the Oxfordian age of the Late Jurassic, which lasted 162 to 155 million years ago. The site was known to locals and hikers at least since the 1950s but was scientifically described only in 2021. Originally located on patented mining claim parcels, the land was acquired by the United States Forest Service in 2024 and incorporated in the Uncompahgre National Forest. It is accessible to the public via a hiking trail.

== Discovery and locality ==
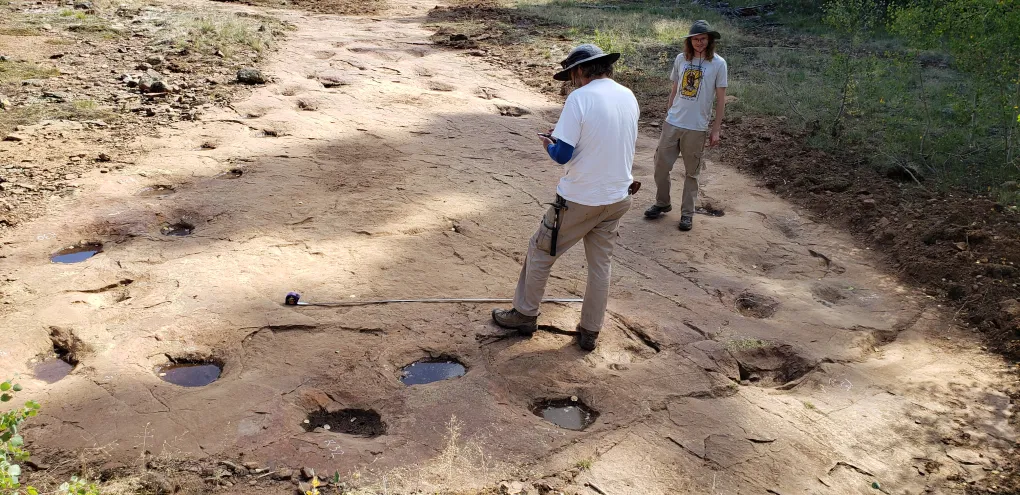
Paleontologists working at the site in September 2020

The site is located directly west of the small town of Ouray, in a historic gold and silver mining area in the San Juan Mountains, which are part of the Rocky Mountains. Located at an altitude of about 2,835 m (9,301 ft), it is a rare example of a high-altitude dinosaur tracksite. The tracks are Late Jurassic in age and therefore predate the uplift of the Rocky Mountains; they were therefore made at a much lower altitude. During the ice age, glaciation removed overburden and destroyed some of the tracks. The glaciation also led to a visible polish of the surface and produced glacial striations.

The tracks were originally located on patented mining claim parcels, which were acquired by the Charles family in 1945, who hoped to mine for gold. The tracks were known to locals at least since the 1950s, when the youngster Rick Trujillo discovered them; at this time, the tracks were mostly overgrown by a thin layer of moss. The parcel was surrounded by the Uncompahgre National Forest, and many hiking trails crossed the area; hikers frequently encountered the tracks. Hikers and locals occasionally cleaned parts of the surface, and, as a consequence, photographs were posted on the internet and the individual tracks became visible in Google Earth. Trujillo later became a geologist, and, after he learned that the Charles family owned the land, informed the family about the significance of the tracks. The family allowed paleontological fieldwork at the site, which was conducted in 2020 and resulted in the first formal description of the tracks in 2021 by Zane Goodell and colleagues. The family also approached the United States Forest Service, which, in 2024, acquired three parcels totaling 27 acres (11 ha), including the tracksite and surrounding areas. The site can be accessed by hikers via the Silvershield trail.

Two or three additional tracks can be found some 1.8 km (1.1 mi) away from the site near the American Nettie Mine, on the same surface. These tracks, which were first reported in 1962, are similar to those of the West Gold Hill site.

== Stratigraphy and paleoenvironment ==
The tracks are preserved on the upper surface of a layer of hard sandstone that is about 5 m (16 ft) in thickness. This sandstone is locally called the "Lower Quartzite". There was some debate about which geological formation this layer is part of, and separate authors assigned it to the Tidwell Member of the Morrison Formation, the Junction Creek Member of the Morrison Formation, or the Junction Creek Member of the Bluff Formation. Goodell and colleagues, in their 2021 description of the site, preferred the assignment to the Bluff Formation, which has been followed by subsequent studies. This places the tracks in the early Late Jurassic, probably the Oxfordian. At the West Gold Hill site, the Junction Creek Member is restricted to only the sandstone layer that contains the tracks, although it is much thicker elsewhere in south-western Colorado. In other areas, the Junction Creek Member is aeolian in origin (deposited by wind), but at the West Gold Hill site, evidence for aeolian deposition is absent. Instead, wave-formed ripple marks can be seen on the surface besides the tracks that would have formed after deposition of the sandstone and before the tracks were made. The tracks are relatively deep, about 10 to 15 cm (3.9 to 5.9 in), indicating that the sediment was saturated, and possibly inundated, at the time of track formation.

== Description and interpretation ==
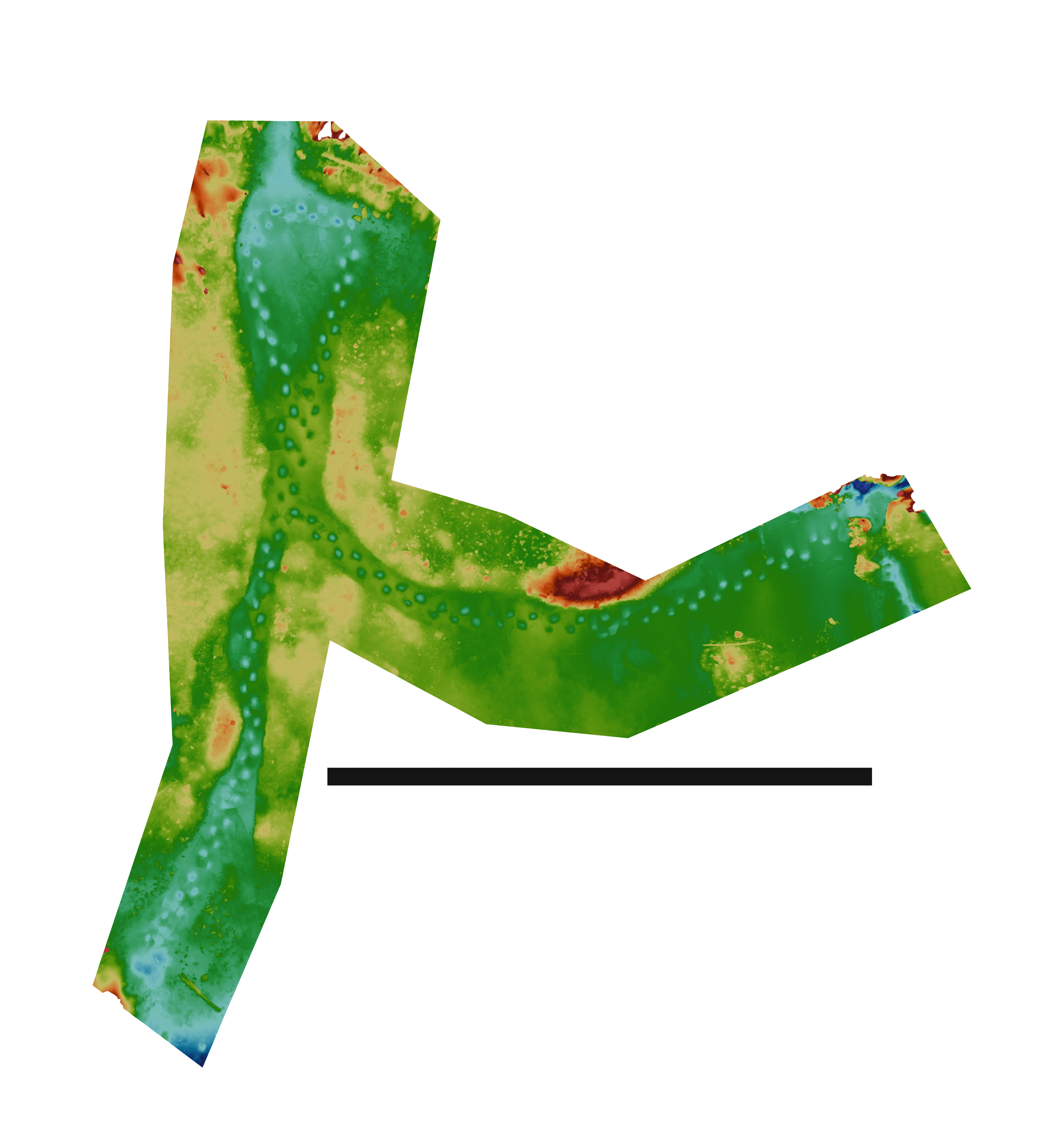
Rendering of a 3D model of the site, where blue indicates lower and red higher areas. View towards the north. The scale bar represents 30 m (98 ft)

The West Gold Hill trackway consists exclusively of impressions of the hind feet; the impressions of the forefeet, which would have been much smaller, were probably overprinted by the hind feet. The trackway is 96.3 m (316 ft) in length when measured along its path and consists of 134 individual tracks in a continuous sequence without any tracks missing in-between. Goodell and colleagues stated that this is the highest count of continuously preserved tracks known from any sauropod trackway globally, but acknowledged that it is not the longest by path length.

The trackway first heads towards the north-northeast, but at its northern point describes a sharp, counter-clockwise turn to continue in a gentle left curve, crossing its own path and finally heading towards the east-northeast. Therefore, the trackway describes a 325° loop. Only one other sauropod trackway is known to describe a similar shape; however, that trackway, from the Zhaojue tracksite in Sichuan, China, was lost to quarrying activities. The reason for the abrupt turn is unknown.

Due to the deep sinking of the feet, most tracks lack anatomical detail. Some of the smaller tracks show a triangular shape with a wide front and a narrower rear, and probably approach the shape of the hind feet. These tracks measure 30 cm (12 in) in length and 26 cm (10 in) in width, suggesting that the trackmaker was relatively small for a sauropod. Digit impressions can sometimes be seen. The trackway is relatively wide-gauged (the tracks do generally not overlap the trackway midline); the trackmaker might have increased its gauge to facilitate walking on the soft sediment. The trackway is also highly variable, including sections in which short steps alternate with long steps; in one case, the long steps are 47% longer than the short steps. The variability along the trackway indicates that the gait was irregular, possibly also due to the soft sediment the animal walked on. Left-to-right steps are longer on average than right-to-left steps.

It is unknown which type of sauropod made the tracks. Two sauropod track ichnogenera are commonly distinguished: the narrow-gauged Parabrontopodus, which might have been produced by diplodocids, and the wide-gauged Brontopodus, which might have been produced by brachiosaurids and similar sauropods. Because the West Gold Hill trackway is intermediate in gauge width between these types, and because it lacks impressions of the forefeet, it has not been assigned to either of these forms.
