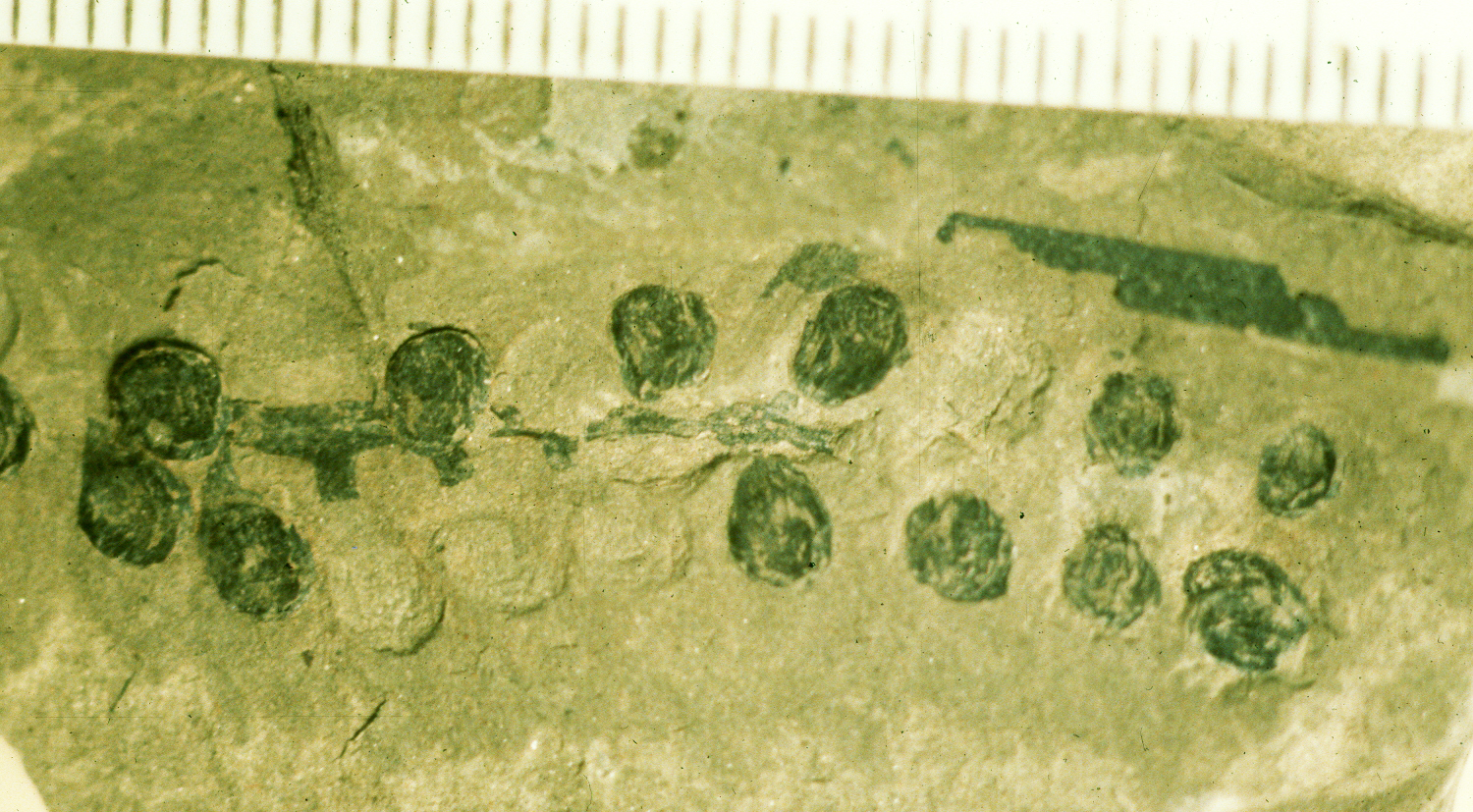
- Caytonia nathorstii ovulate structure, Middle Jurassic, Gristhorpe Bed, Cloughton Formation, Cayton Bay, Yorkshire.

Scientific classification
- Kingdom: Plantae
- Clade: Embryophytes
- Clade: Tracheophytes
- Clade: Spermatophytes
- Division: †Pteridospermatophyta
- Order: †Caytoniales
- Family: †Caytoniaceae
- Genus: †Caytonia; H.H.Thomas, 1925

Species
- Caytonia nathorstii

= Caytonia =

Caytonia Temporal range: Jurassic −

Extinct genus of seed ferns

Caytonia is an extinct genus of seed ferns.

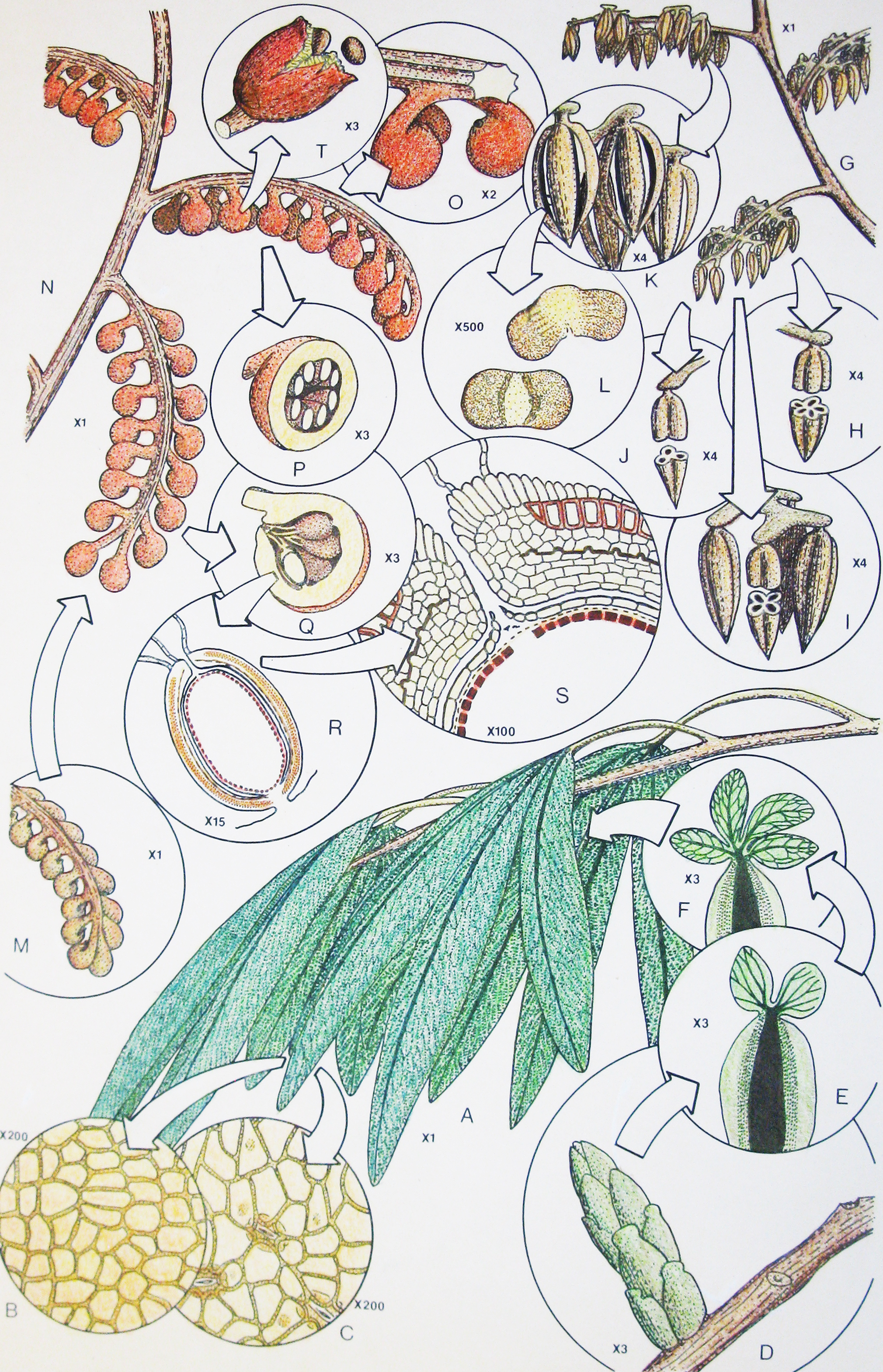
A complete reconstruction of Caytonia nathorstii plant Retallack and Dilcher 1988

== Description ==
Caytonia has berry-like cupules with numerous small seeds arrayed along axes

It was once thought to be an ancestor of the flowering plants, but after its method of pollination was identified, it was re-assigned as a gymnosperm.

== Whole plant reconstructions ==
Different organs attributed to the same original plant can be reconstructed from co-occurrence at the same locality and from similarities in the stomatal apparatus and other anatomical peculiarities of fossilized cuticles.

- Caytonia nathorstii may have been produced by the same plant as Caytonanthus arberi (pollen organs) and Sagenopteris phillipsii (leaves).
