= Thoirette-Coisia =

- Commune
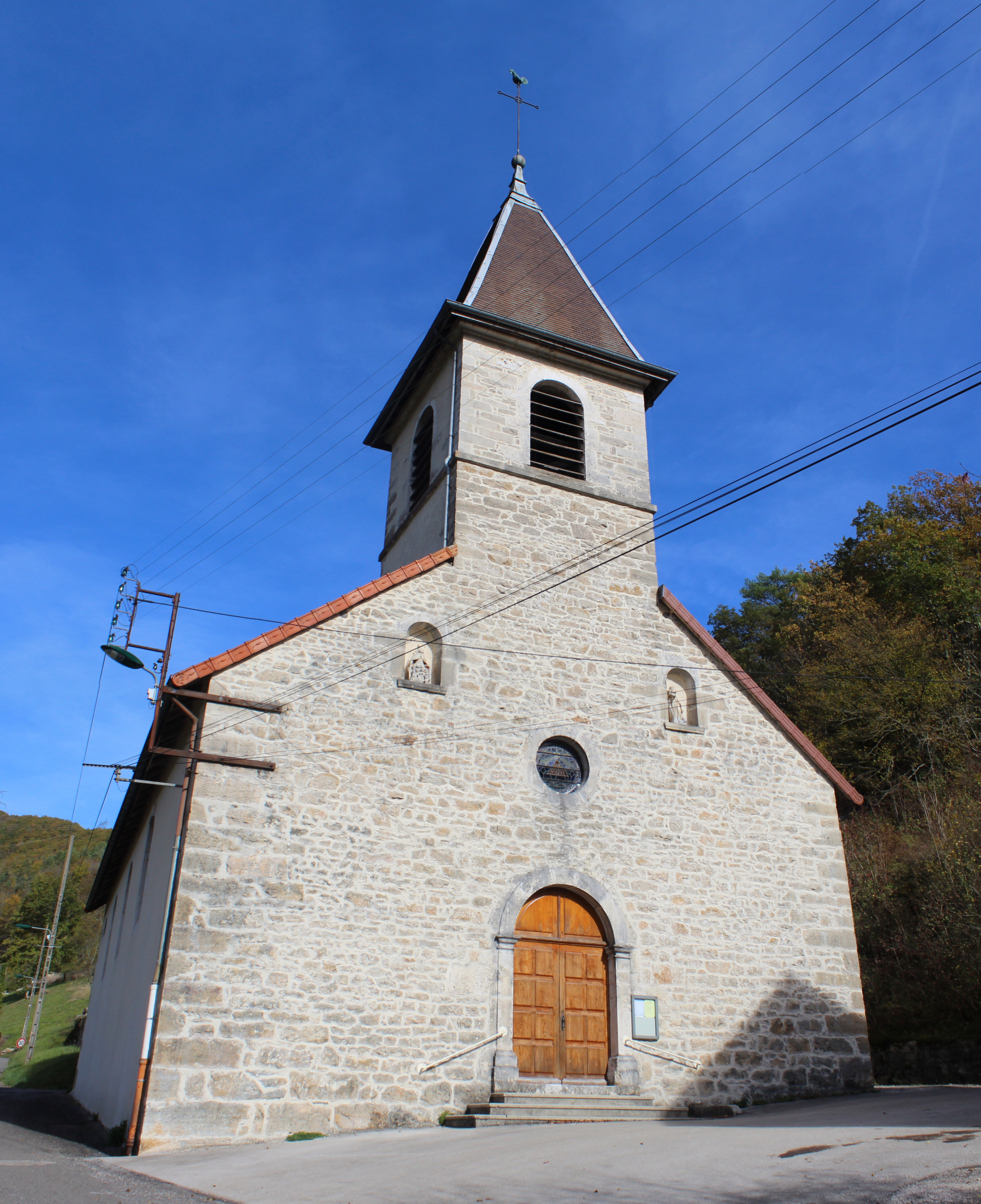
- The church in Thoirette-Coisia
- Location of Thoirette-Coisia
- Location within France Location within Bourgogne-Franche-Comté
- Coordinates: 46°16′19″N 5°31′59″E
- Country: France
- Region: Bourgogne-Franche-Comté
- Department: Jura
- Arrondissement: Lons-le-Saunier
- Canton: Moirans-en-Montagne

Government
  - Mayor (2026–32): Patrice Boulanger
- Area^{1}: 15.50 km^{2} (5.98 sq mi)
- Population (2023): 809
  - Density: 52.2/km^{2} (135/sq mi)
- Time zone: UTC+01:00 (CET)
  - Summer (DST): UTC+02:00 (CEST)
- INSEE/Postal code: 39530 /39240
- ^{1} French Land Register data, which excludes lakes, ponds, glaciers > 1 km^{2} (0.386 sq mi or 247 acres) and river estuaries.

Thoirette-Coisia (French pronunciation: [twaʁɛt kwazja]) is a commune in the department of Jura, eastern France. The municipality was established on 1 January 2017 by merger of the former communes of Thoirette (the seat) and Coisia.

== See also ==
- Communes of the Jura department
