= Thoirette =

Commune in Jura, France

- Part of Thoirette-Coisia
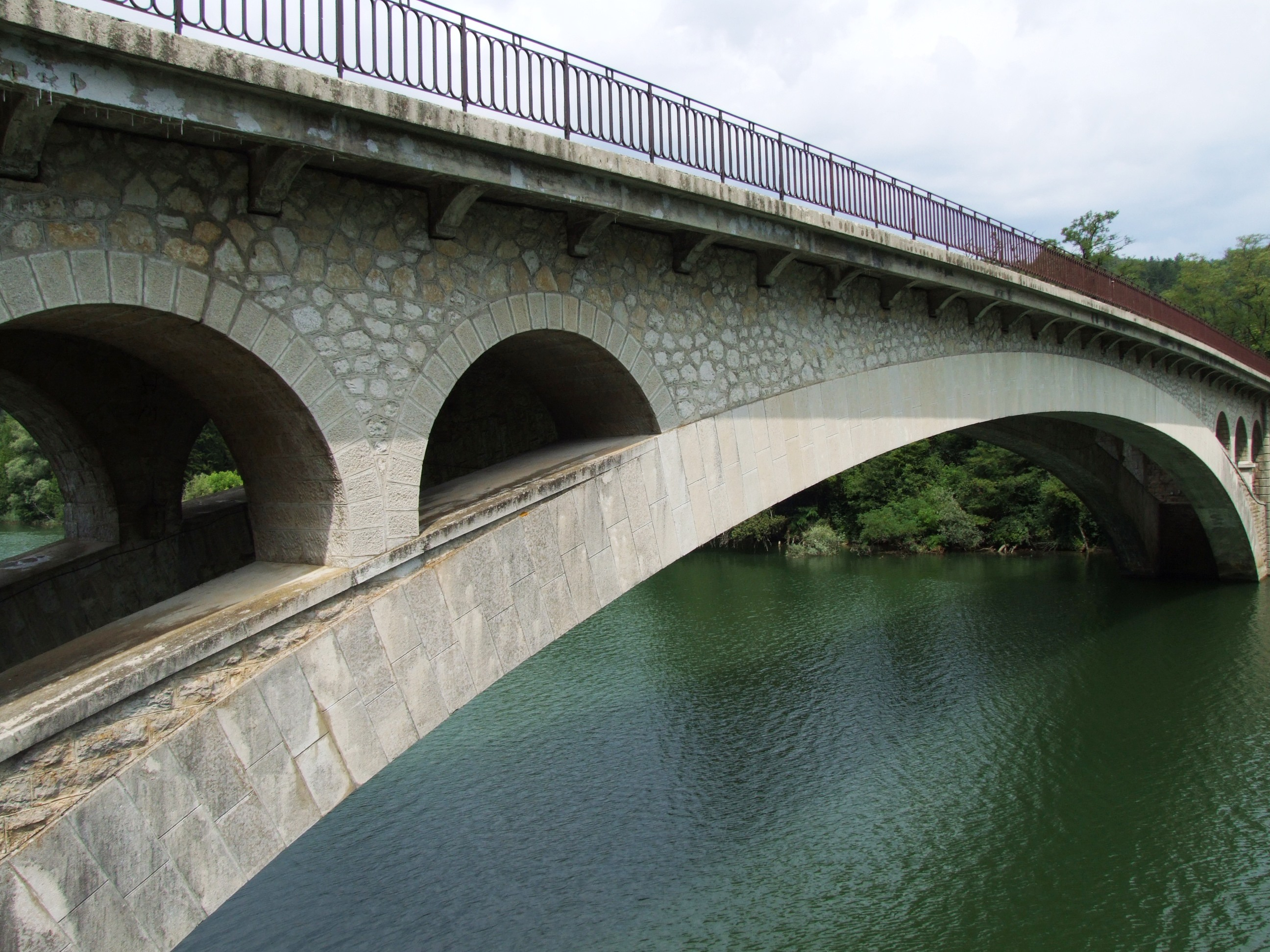
- Bridge over the Ain
- Location of Thoirette
- Location within France Location within Bourgogne-Franche-Comté
- Coordinates: 46°16′19″N 5°32′00″E
- Country: France
- Region: Bourgogne-Franche-Comté
- Department: Jura
- Arrondissement: Lons-le-Saunier
- Canton: Moirans-en-Montagne
- Commune: Thoirette-Coisia
- Area^{1}: 8.77 km^{2} (3.39 sq mi)
- Highest elevation: 635 m (2,083 ft)
- Lowest elevation: 275 m (902 ft)
- Population (2019): 680
  - Density: 78/km^{2} (200/sq mi)
- Time zone: UTC+01:00 (CET)
  - Summer (DST): UTC+02:00 (CEST)
- Postal code: 39240
- ^{1} French Land Register data, which excludes lakes, ponds, glaciers > 1 km^{2} (0.386 sq mi or 247 acres) and river estuaries.

Thoirette is a former commune in the Jura department in the Bourgogne-Franche-Comté region of eastern France. On 1 January 2017, it was merged into the new commune Thoirette-Coisia.

== Population ==
Historical population

Year	Pop.	±% p.a.
1831	580	—
1846	677	+1.04%
1872	549	−0.80%
1901	435	−0.80%
1926	386	−0.48%
1946	294	−1.35%
1962	205	−2.23%

Year	Pop.	±% p.a.
1968	223	+1.41%
1975	234	+0.69%
1982	291	+3.16%
1990	427	+4.91%
1999	543	+2.71%
2008	617	+1.43%
2019	680	+0.89%

Source: EHESS and INSEE

== Personalities ==
Thoirette is the birthplace of the anatomist Xavier Bichat (1771–1802), whose house still exists in the older part of town.

== See also ==
- Communes of the Jura department
