= Hirmeriella =

Scientific classification
- Kingdom: Plantae
- Clade: Tracheophytes
- Clade: Gymnospermae
- Division: Pinophyta
- Class: Pinopsida
- Order: Pinales
- Family: †Cheirolepidiaceae
- Genus: †Hirmeriella; Hörhammer

Genus of conifers

Hirmeriella is a genus of fossil tree, a conifer that was widespread in Late Triassic and Early Jurassic of Germany, the UK, and Poland. It is common in the fissure fills of Glamorgan, south Wales, where many of the UK's earliest mammal fossils have been found such as Morganucodon.

The name Hirmeriella muensteri has now been used to describe the whole plant, but it may also specifically refer to fossils of female parts of the plant, while male parts of the conifer may be known by the scientific name Brachyphyllum muensteri, and fossils with neither gender parts have been known as Pagiophyllum. Hirmeriella is also known by the pseudonym Cheirolepis muensteri.

Hirmeriella muensteri may have grown in dry, extreme conditions, and been fire tolerant, although other authors have cited evidence from water wicking leaves as signs they were found in humid, water rich environments.
