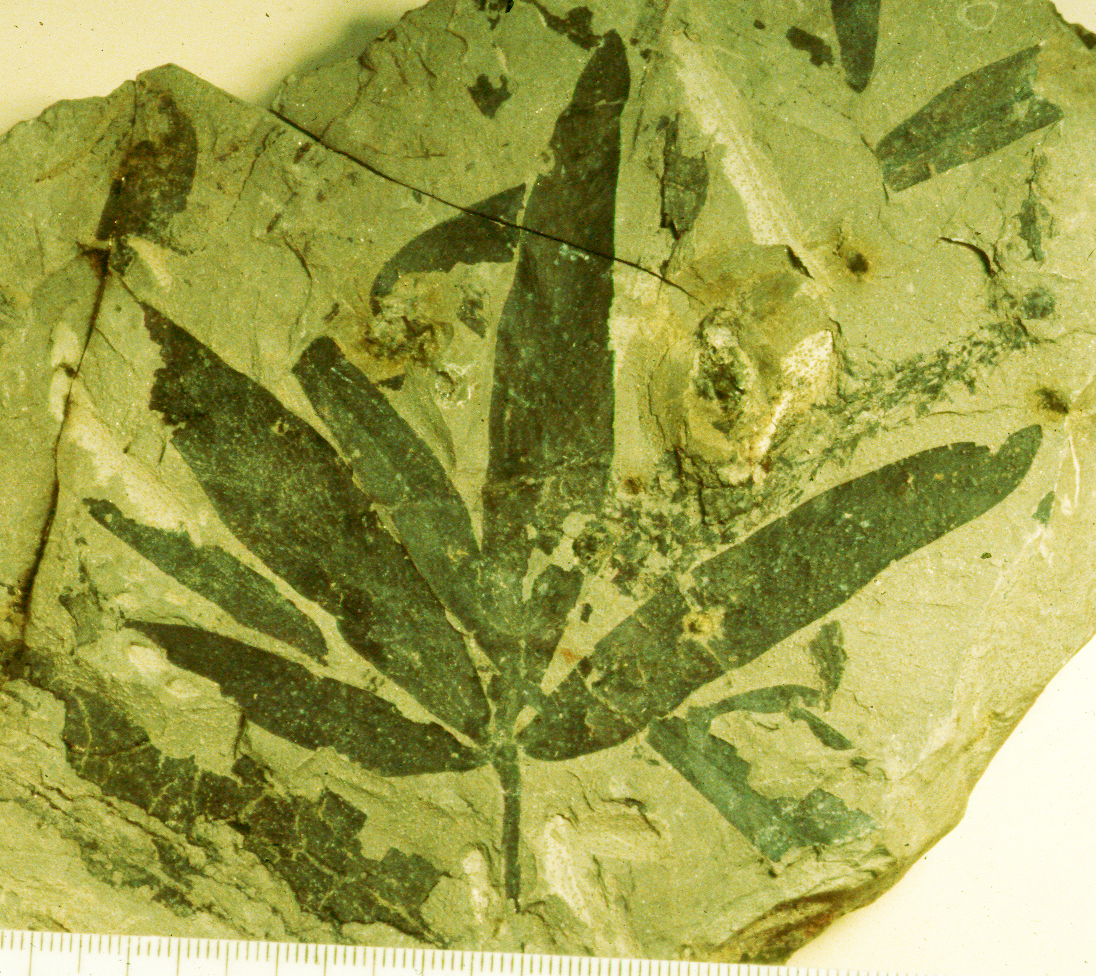
- Sagenopteris phillipsii leaves, Middle Jurassic, Gristhorpe Bed, Cloughton Formation, Cayton Bay, Yorkshire.

Scientific classification
- Kingdom: Plantae
- Clade: Tracheophytes
- Division: †Pteridospermatophyta
- Order: †Caytoniales
- Family: †Caytoniaceae
- Genus: †Sagenopteris
- Species: †S. phillipsii

Binomial name
- †Sagenopteris phillipsii (Brongn.) Presl

= Sagenopteris phillipsii =

Sagenopteris phillipsii Temporal range: Jurassic −

Extinct species of ferns

Sagenopteris phillipsii are leaves of extinct species of seed ferns.

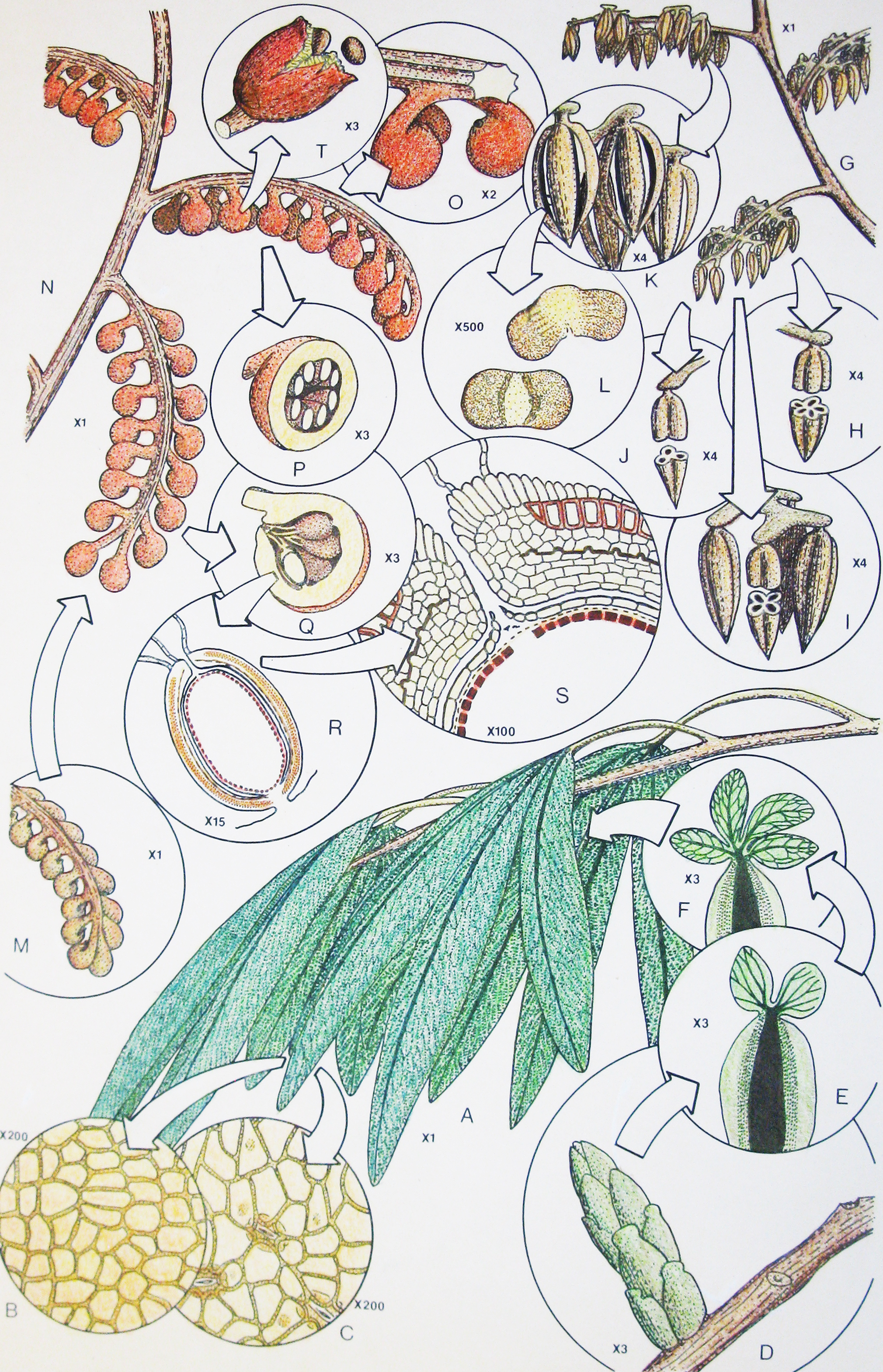
A complete reconstruction of Caytonia nathorstii plant Retallack and Dilcher 1988

== Description ==
Sagenopteris phillipsii has narrow, palmately arranged leaves with anastomosing venation

== Whole plant reconstructions ==
Different organs attributed to the same original plant can be reconstructed from co-occurrence at the same locality and from similarities in the stomatal apparatus and other anatomical peculiarities of fossilized cuticles.

- Sagenopteris phillipsii may have been produced by the same plant as Caytonia nathorstii (ovulate organs) and Caytonanthus arberi (pollen organs).
