= Coisia =

Commune in Jura, France

- Part of Thoirette-Coisia
- Location of Coisia
- Location within France Location within Bourgogne-Franche-Comté
- Coordinates: 46°18′23″N 5°34′54″E
- Country: France
- Region: Bourgogne-Franche-Comté
- Department: Jura
- Arrondissement: Lons-le-Saunier
- Canton: Moirans-en-Montagne
- Commune: Thoirette-Coisia
- Area^{1}: 6.73 km^{2} (2.60 sq mi)
- Highest elevation: 756 m (2,480 ft)
- Lowest elevation: 285 m (935 ft)
- Population (2019): 175
  - Density: 26.0/km^{2} (67.3/sq mi)
- Time zone: UTC+01:00 (CET)
  - Summer (DST): UTC+02:00 (CEST)
- Postal code: 39240
- ^{1} French Land Register data, which excludes lakes, ponds, glaciers > 1 km^{2} (0.386 sq mi or 247 acres) and river estuaries.

Coisia (French pronunciation: [kwazja]) is a former commune in the Jura department in Bourgogne-Franche-Comté in eastern France. On 1 January 2017, it was merged into the new commune Thoirette-Coisia.

== See also ==
- Communes of the Jura department
