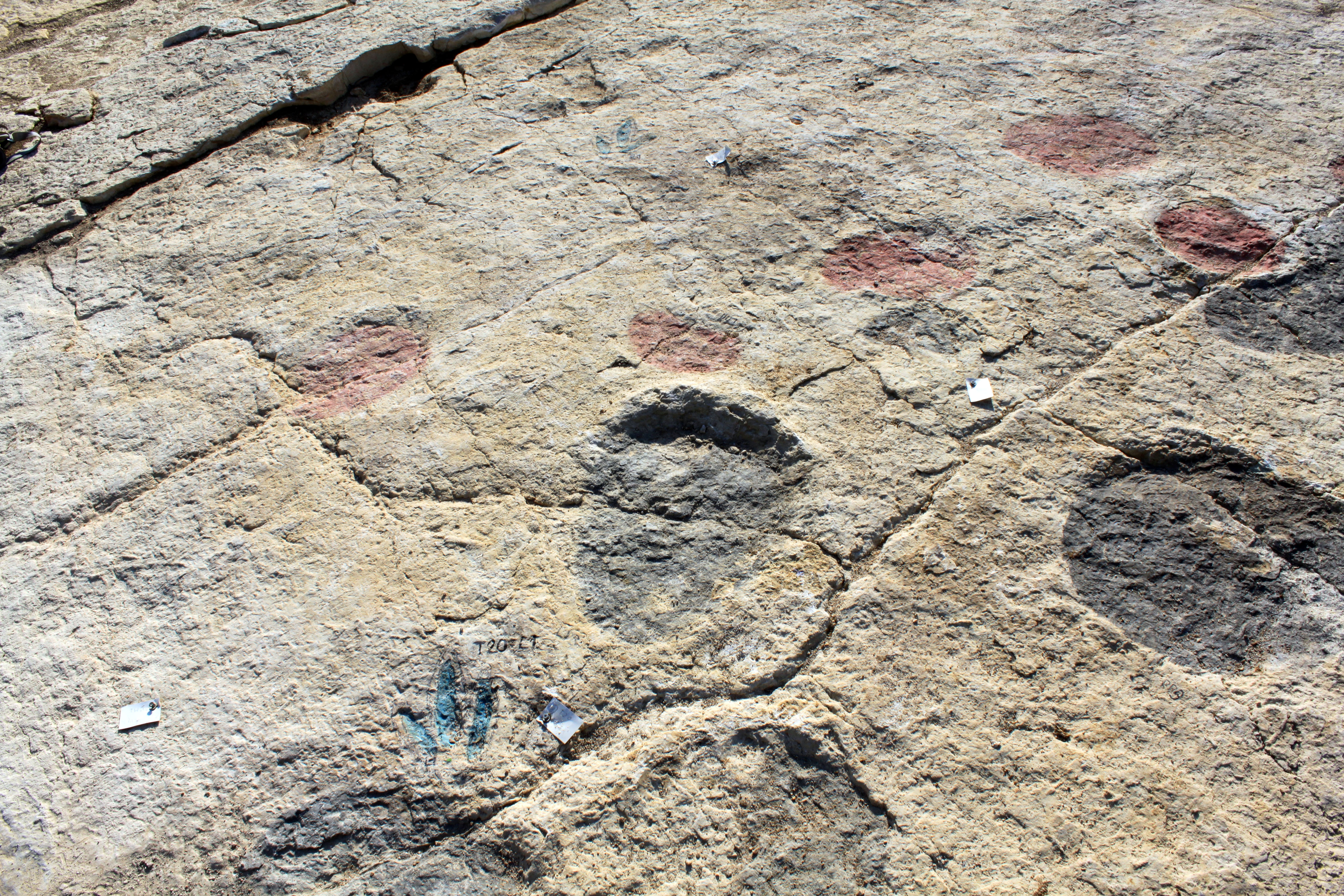
- Tracks near the A16 highway, Switzerland

Trace fossil classification
- Kingdom: Animalia
- Phylum: Chordata
- Class: Reptilia
- Clade: Dinosauria
- Clade: Saurischia
- Clade: †Sauropodomorpha
- Clade: †Sauropoda
- Ichnogenus: †Parabrontopodus; Lockley, Farlow, & Meyer, 1994

Type ichnospecies
- Parabrontopodus mcintoshi Lockley, Farlow, & Meyer, 1994

= Parabrontopodus =

Dinosaur footprint

Parabrontopodus is an ichnogenus of dinosaur footprint, that was initially described by Lockley et al. in 1994, and was assigned to Sauropoda by Lockley in 2002 and in 2004 by Niedzwiedzki and Pienkowski. Various species leave their footprints, which are characterized by the association of two impressions left by hand and foot. The acquisition of a specific family is complex, but now in most cases, they have been considered diplodocoids and similar animals. The reason is that their traces left are large, but in proportion to the size, they seem very light because the depth of imprint is low.

Farlow, in 1992, had given a criterion for classifying sauropod tracks. Traces are distinguished wide as Brontopodus (Farlow et al., 1989) and the narrow track related to Breviparopus (Dutuit et al., 1980 cf. Farlow, 1992). As the Parabrontopodus track ratio is 1:5, it is considered narrow by Lockley.

== Species recognized ==
- P. mcintoshi - It was built based on abundant fossil tracks at the Purgatoire site southeast of Colorado, but the holotype is a pair of hands and feet (CU-CTM 190–5). The footprint measures 91 centimeters (3.0 ft). The type species is considered a diplodocoid.
- P. distercii - Based on a trackway consisting of 17 prints of the fore and hind feet found at the site of Salgar Chairs (Soria, Spain). The hind footprints are elongated, averaging 148.5 cm (4.9 ft) long and only 72.7 cm (2.4 ft) wide.

== Discoveries concerning Parabrontopodus ==
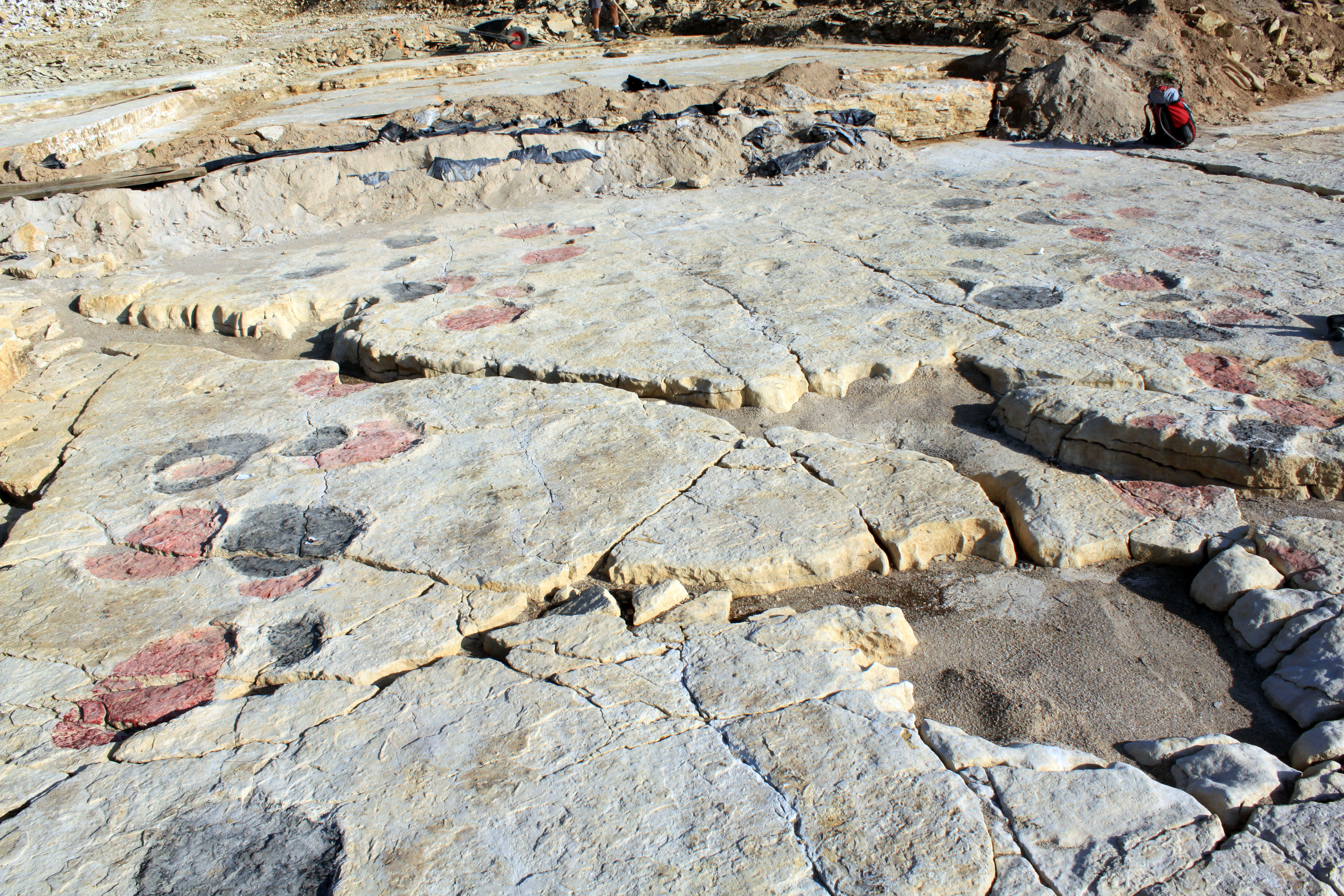
Tracks in Switzerland

- France (Coisia, Jura) (Jurassic, Late Tithonian)
- Italy, in the region of the Dolomites, Lavini di Marco (it), (Jurassic)
- Romania, in the southwestern region of Anina, (Early Jurassic)

These are probably ornithopods. The remains that were attributed to Parabrontopodus because they have similar tracks. The size is 45–50 cm.

- Portugal, near Cabo Espichel (pt) (Kimmeridgian, Tithonian, later Jurassic)

In a path, five brands were found in the other layers of rock in the area; there are also isolated prints, which are poorly conserved.

- Switzerland, Jura Mountains, Training Reuchenette (mid Kimmeridgian, Jurassic)

There are 17 tracks of Parabrontopodus discovered in 2002. They are covered by at least six layers, with a total thickness of one meter. In the summer of 2005, a smaller fossil was found, spread about 2 meters (6 ft 6.7 in) on a trail. The individual traces have a length of 20 cm (0.7 ft) and a width of 13.5 cm (0.4 ft). The animal was probably still in the first year of life.

- Spain, province of La Rioja, Enciso formation (Cretaceous, lower Neocomian)

No further details available.

- Chile, discovered in the formation Termas del Flaco (es) VI Región of the country, dating is estimated at Tithonian (Late Jurassic)

Small traces were named Parabrontopodus by Casamiquela, Frenkii, and Fasola in 1968. This is one case that was considered a titanosaur because, unlike them, their limbs were less apart, leaving a trail of footprints close together. The discovery was named before Iguanodonichnus frenkii.

== See also ==
- List of dinosaur ichnogenera
