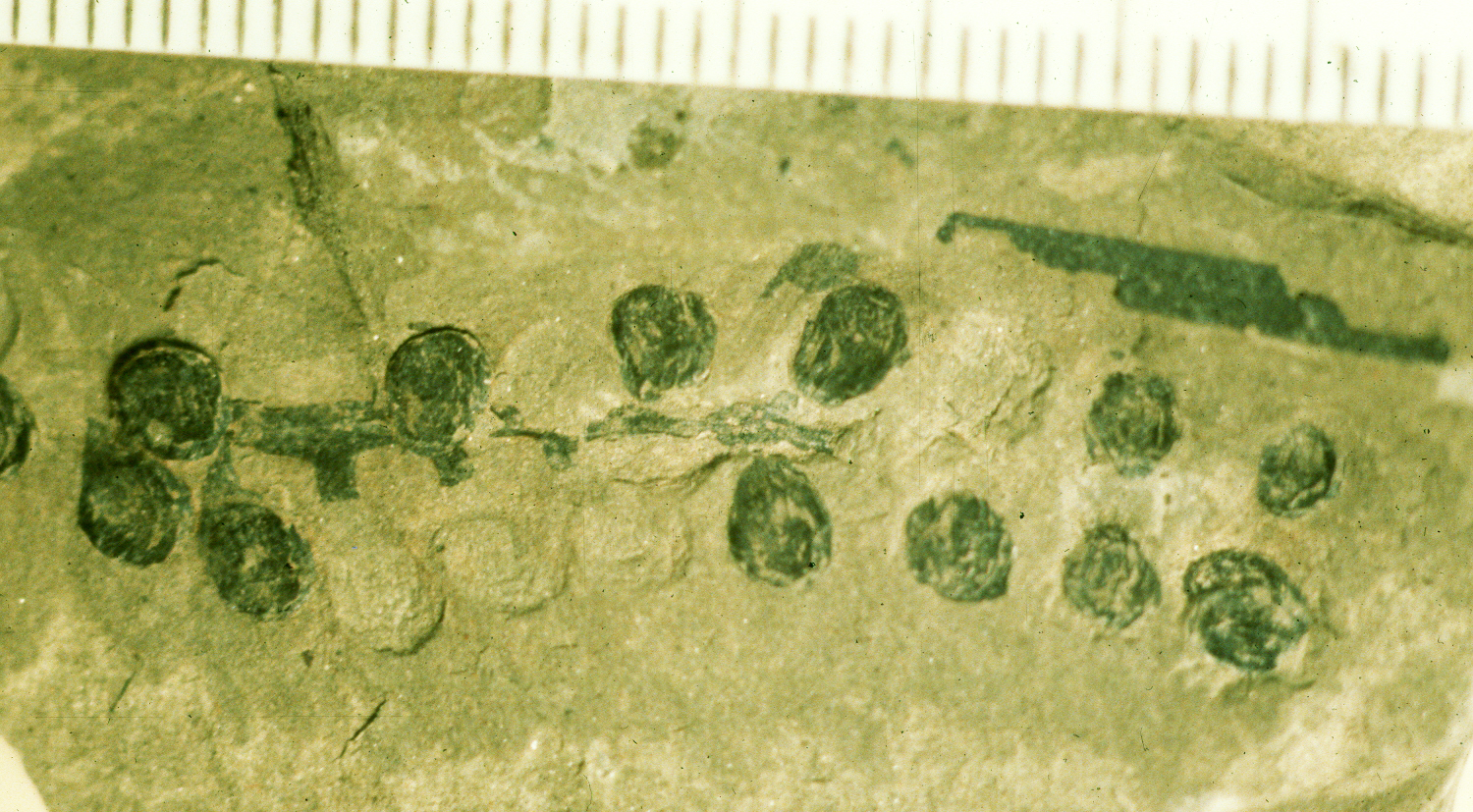
- Caytonia nathorstii ovulate structure, Middle Jurassic, Gristhorpe Bed, Cloughton Formation, Cayton Bay, Yorkshire.

Scientific classification
- Kingdom: Plantae
- Clade: Tracheophytes
- Division: †Pteridospermatophyta
- Order: †Caytoniales
- Family: †Caytoniaceae
- Genus: †Caytonia
- Species: †C. nathorstii

Binomial name
- †Caytonia nathorstii

= Caytonia nathorstii =

Caytonia nathorstii Temporal range: Jurassic −

Extinct species of seed fern

Caytonia nathorstii is an extinct species of seed ferns.

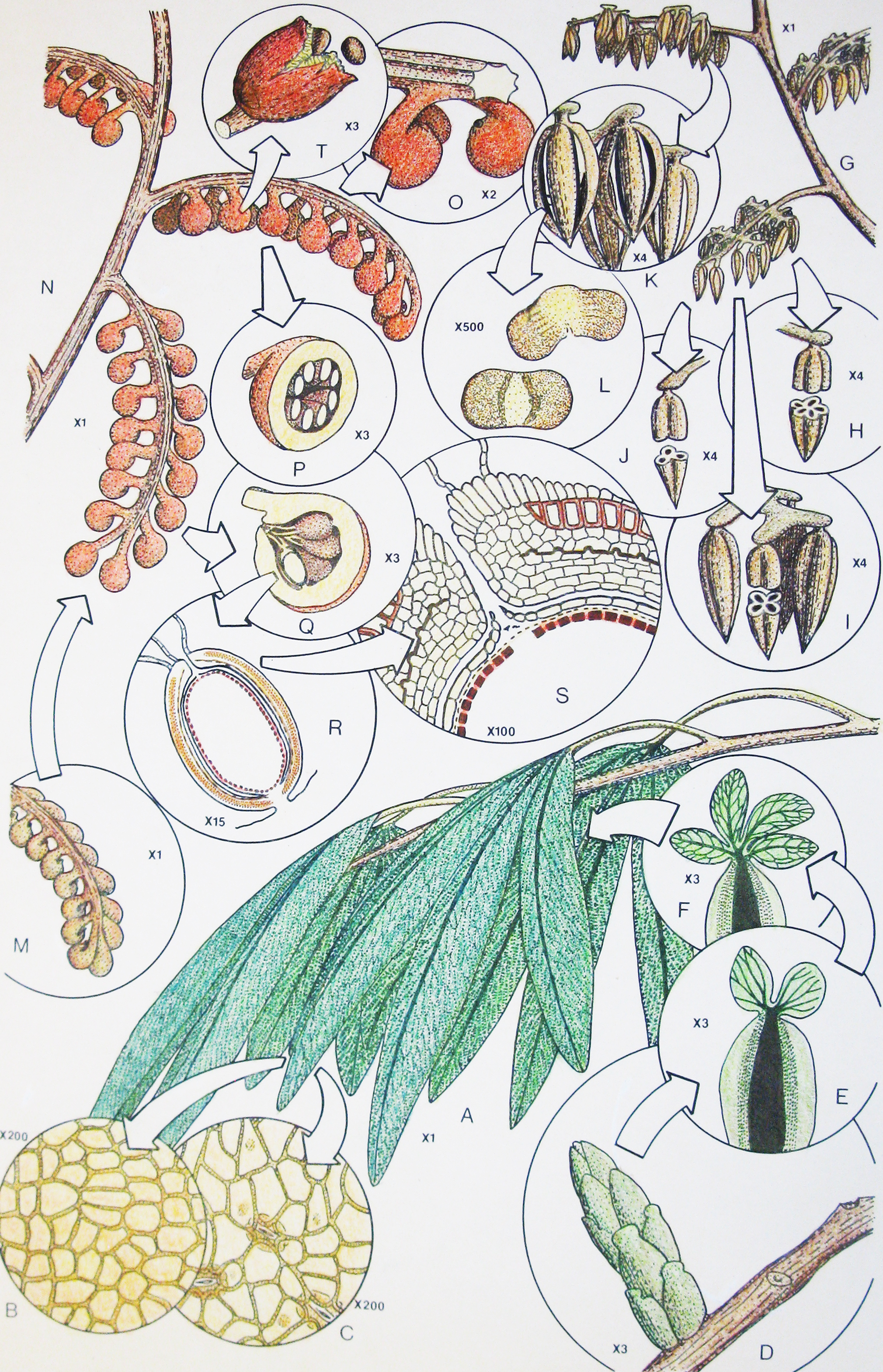
A complete reconstruction of Caytonia nathorstii plant Retallack and Dilcher 1988

== Description ==
Caytonia has berry like cupules with numerous small seeds arrayed along axes

== Whole plant reconstructions ==
Different organs attributed to the same original plant can be reconstructed from co-occurrence at the same locality and from similarities in the stomatal apparatus and other anatomical peculiarities of fossilized cuticles.

- Caytonia nathorstii may have been produced by the same plant as Caytonanthus arberi (pollen organs) and Sagenopteris phillipsii (leaves).
