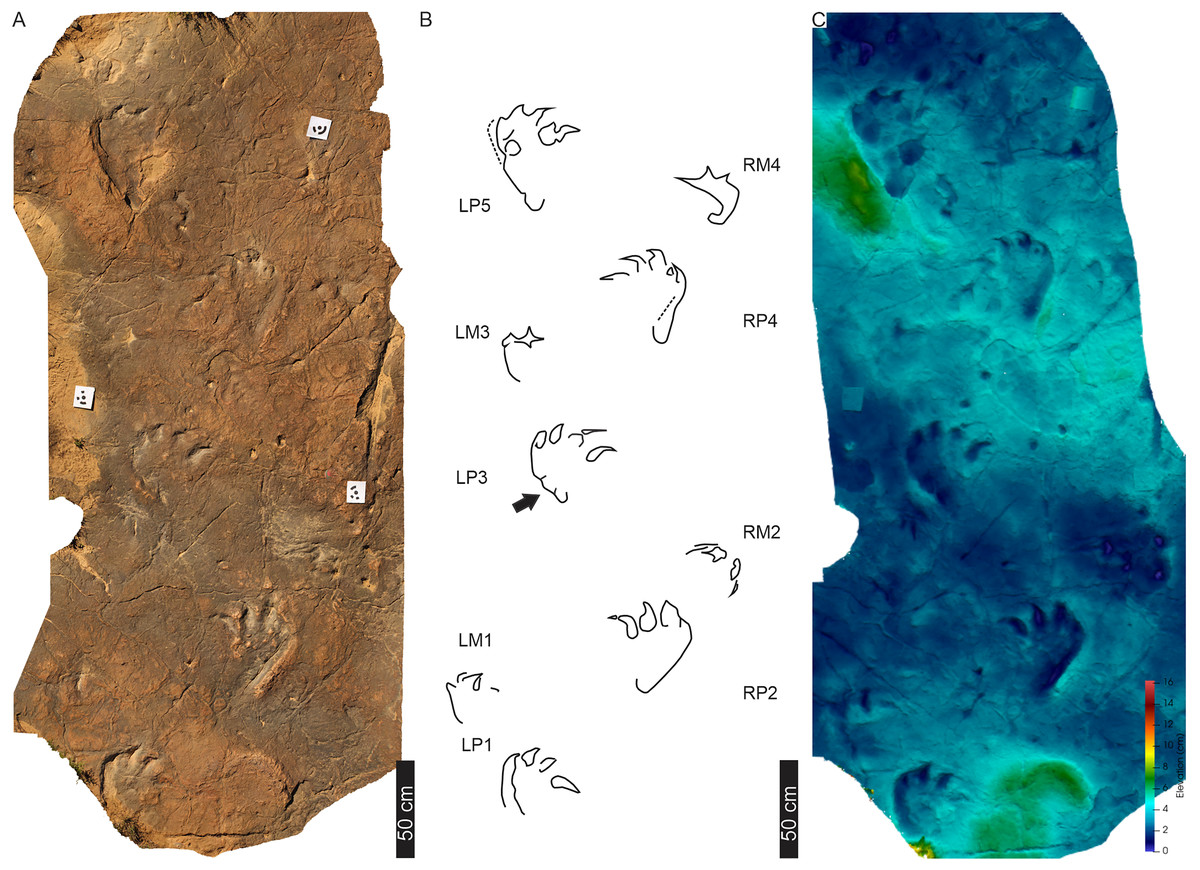
- Trackway of T. unguiferus

Trace fossil classification
- Domain: Eukaryota
- Kingdom: Animalia
- Phylum: Chordata
- Clade: Dinosauria
- Clade: Saurischia
- Clade: †Sauropodomorpha
- Ichnofamily: †Navahopodidae
- Ichnogenus: †Tetrasauropus

= Tetrasauropus =

Tetrasauropus Temporal range: Late Triassic, ~205 Ma

Dinosaur footprint

Tetrasauropus is an ichnogenus of dinosaur footprint from the Elliot Formation.

== See also ==
- List of dinosaur ichnogenera
