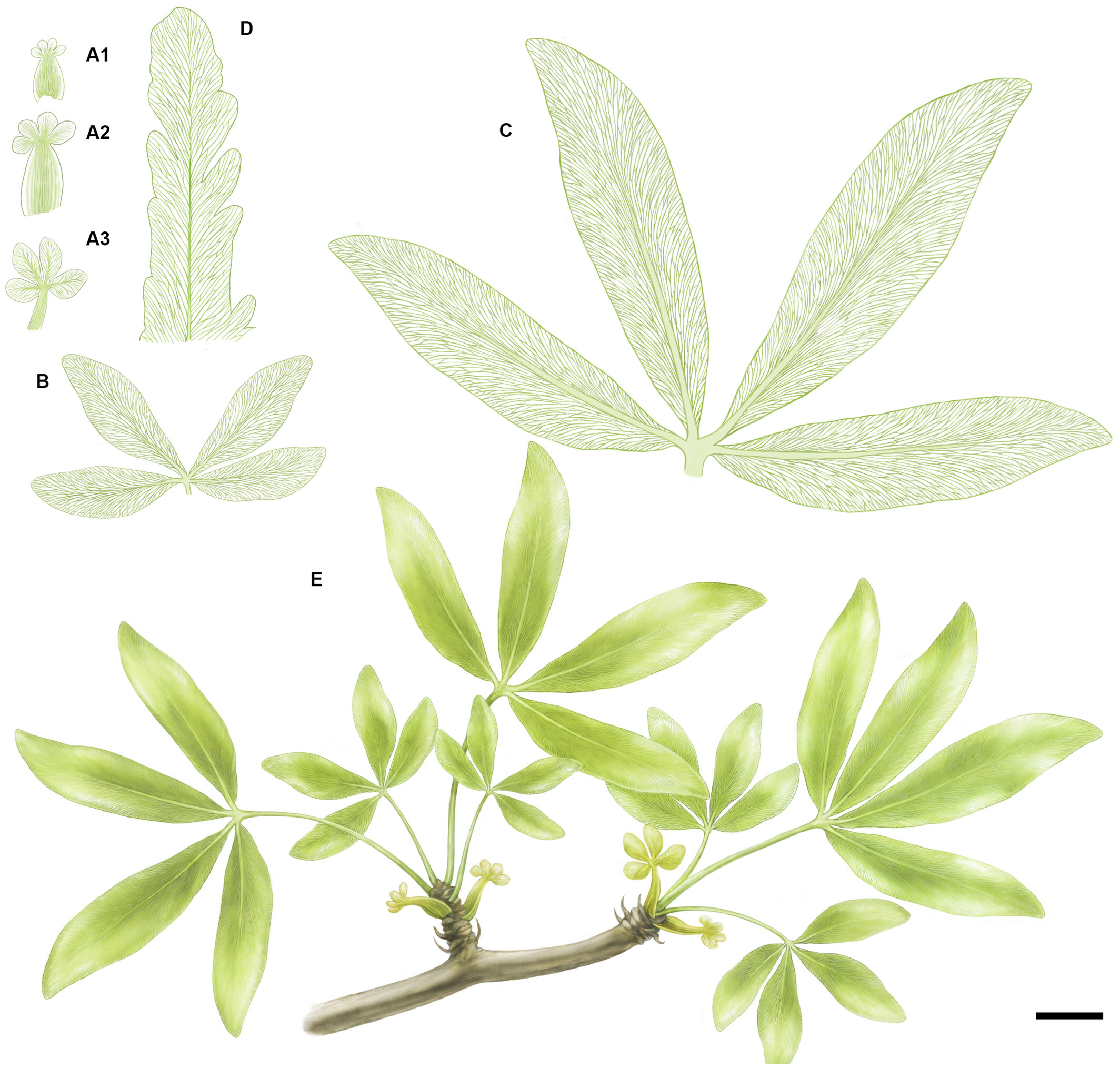
- Illustration showing change in leaf shape of Sagenopteris acuminata during growth, and mature leaves attached to woody stem

Scientific classification
- Kingdom: Plantae
- Clade: Tracheophytes
- Division: †Pteridospermatophyta
- Order: †Caytoniales
- Family: †Caytoniaceae
- Genus: †Sagenopteris; Presl 1838

Species
- See text

= Sagenopteris =

Sagenopteris Temporal range: Middle Triassic-Late Cretaceous Anisian–Campanian

Extinct genus of seed ferns

Sagenopteris is a form genus of leaves belonging to the extinct seed plant order Caytoniales, spanning from the Middle Triassic to Late Cretaceous.

== Description ==
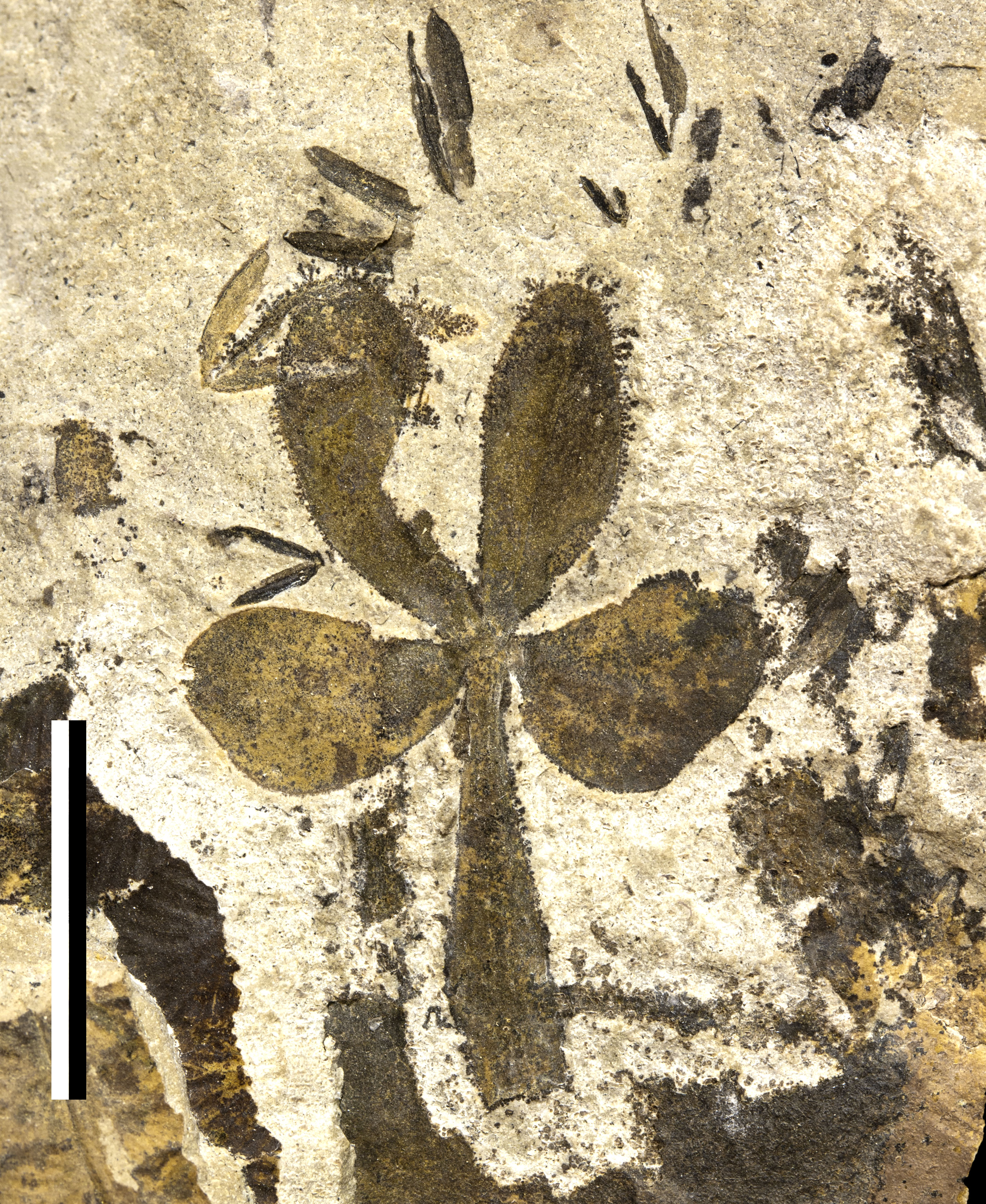
Immature leaf of Sagenopteris trapialensis

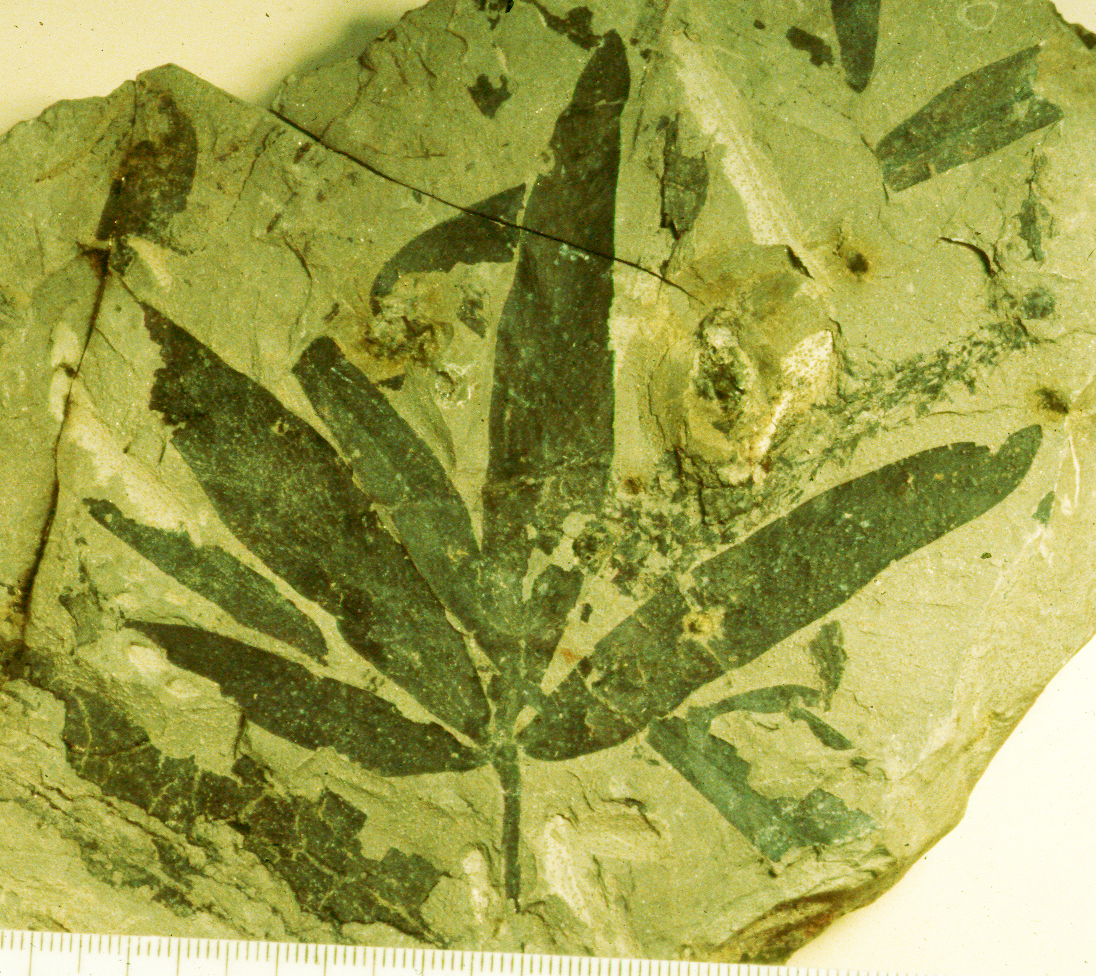
Mature leaf of Sagenopteris phillipsi

Sagenopteris has two pairs (making four in total) of palmately arranged leaflets with anastomosing venation and a prominent midrib, which are all attached to the apex of a petiole. Mature leaves are generally lanceolate to oblanceolate, the edges are generally entire (smooth), slightly undulating, and occasionally lobed or dentate (toothed), the cuticle is somewhat thick, and the stomata are only present on the underside (abaxial surface) of the leaflets. According to Xu et al. 2024, the stomata are characterised by "guard cells with a flat surface and a sunken region around the aperture; guard cells typically surrounded by a single ring of weakly modified neighbouring cells in an anomocytic arrangement".

Different organs attributed to the same original plant can be reconstructed from co-occurrence at the same locality and from similarities in the stomatal apparatus and other anatomical peculiarities of fossilized cuticles.

- Sagenopteris phillipsii may have been produced by the same plant as Caytonia nathorstii (ovulate organs) and Caytonanthus arberi (pollen organs).

== Species ==
The following species have been described:

- Sagenopteris colpodes
- Sagenopteris elliptica
- Sagenopteris mclearni
- Sagenopteris nilssoniana
- Sagenopteris oregonensis
- Sagenopteris phillipsii
- Sagenopteris trapialensis
- Sagenopteris variabilis
- Sagenopteris williamsii

In a 2024 review, only 5 species, Sagenopteris acuminata (which was designated the lectotype species), S. colpodes, S. hallei, S. phillipsii and S. pualensis were considered valid.

== Distribution ==
Fossils of Sagenopteris have been registered in:

Triassic

Argentina, China, Germany, Greenland, Italy, Japan, Kyrgyzstan, the Russian Federation, Sweden, Tajikistan, Ukraine, United States (Virginia, Virginia/North Carolina).

Jurassic (to Cretaceous)

Afghanistan, Antarctica, Argentina, Azerbaijan, Belarus, Canada (British Columbia, Yukon), China, Colombia (Valle Alto Formation, Caldas), Georgia, Germany, Greenland, India, Iran, Italy, Japan, Kazakhstan, Kyrgyzstan, Mexico, Peru, Poland, Romania, the Russian Federation, Tajikistan, Turkmenistan, Ukraine, the United Kingdom, United States (Alaska, Montana, Oregon/Idaho), and Uzbekistan.

Cretaceous

Spain, Belgium, Canada (British Columbia and Alberta), Greenland, the Russian Federation, and the United States (Montana).
