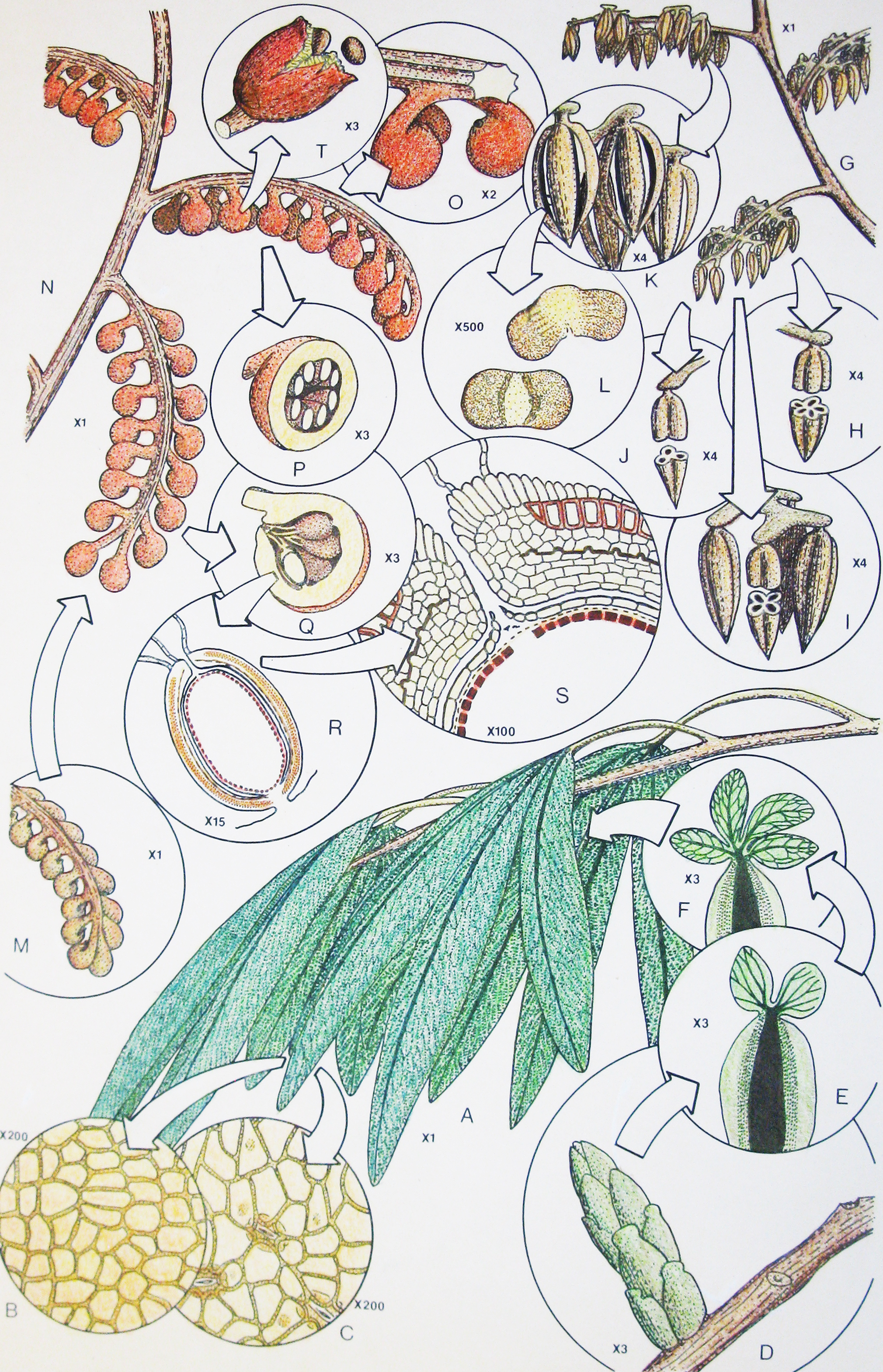
- Fig.1 A whole-plant reconstruction of Caytonia nathorstii

Scientific classification
- Kingdom: Plantae
- Clade: Tracheophytes
- Division: †Pteridospermatophyta
- Order: †Caytoniales; Gothan, 1932
- Family: †Caytoniaceae; Kräusel, 1926

Form genera
- Caytonanthus pollen organ; Caytonia ovulate structure; Sagenopteris palmate leaves; Reymanownaea pollen organ; Vitreisporites pollen

= Caytoniales =

Caytoniales Temporal range: Middle Triassic-Late Cretaceous (Anisian-Campanian)

Extinct order of plants

The Caytoniales are an extinct order of seed plants known from fossils spanning from the Middle Triassic (Anisian) to the Late Cretaceous (Campanian). They are regarded as "seed ferns" because they are seed-bearing plants with fern-like leaves. Although at one time considered angiosperms because of their berry-like cupules, that hypothesis was later disproven. Nevertheless, many authorities consider them likely ancestors or close relatives of angiosperms. The origin of angiosperms remains unclear, and they cannot be linked with any known seed plants groups with certainty.

== History ==
The first fossils identified in this order were discovered in the Middle Jurassic Gristhorpe bed of the Cloughton Formation in Cayton Bay, Yorkshire, with the name of the bay giving the name to the group. They have since been found in Mesozoic rocks all over world. It is likely that Caytoniales flourished in wetland areas, because they are often found with other moisture-loving plants such as horsetails in waterlogged paleosols. The first fossil Caytoniales were preserved as compressions in shale with excellent preservation of cuticles allowing study of cellular histology.

== Description ==
The woody nature of associated stalks and preserved short shoots are evidence that Caytoniales were seasonally deciduous shrubs or trees. Caytoniales had fertile branches with seed-bearing cupules. The ovules were located inside fleshy cupules with tough outer cuticle. Individual ovules had an apical tube called a micropylar canal, that allowed pollen to pass into the pollen chamber. The outer layers of the cupules were fleshy and fruit-like; it is possible this was to aid in animal dispersal. The cupules are 4-5mm in diameter and about 3 mm long (Fig 1-2), and resemble a blueberry. The extra protection of the reproductive organs gave rise to the idea that Caytoniales were predecessors to angiosperms, which have completely enclosed seeds.

The pollen grains were small, between 25 and 30 μm in diameter. The size of the pollen grains supports the idea that they were wind-pollinated, and their bisaccate wings may have enabled entry into the seed by a pollination drop mechanism. In both respects they were like pollen of pine trees. They were produced in pollen sacs in coalesced groups of four, attached to branching structures. The pollen sacs hang off the structure in clusters, and are typically 2 cm in length.

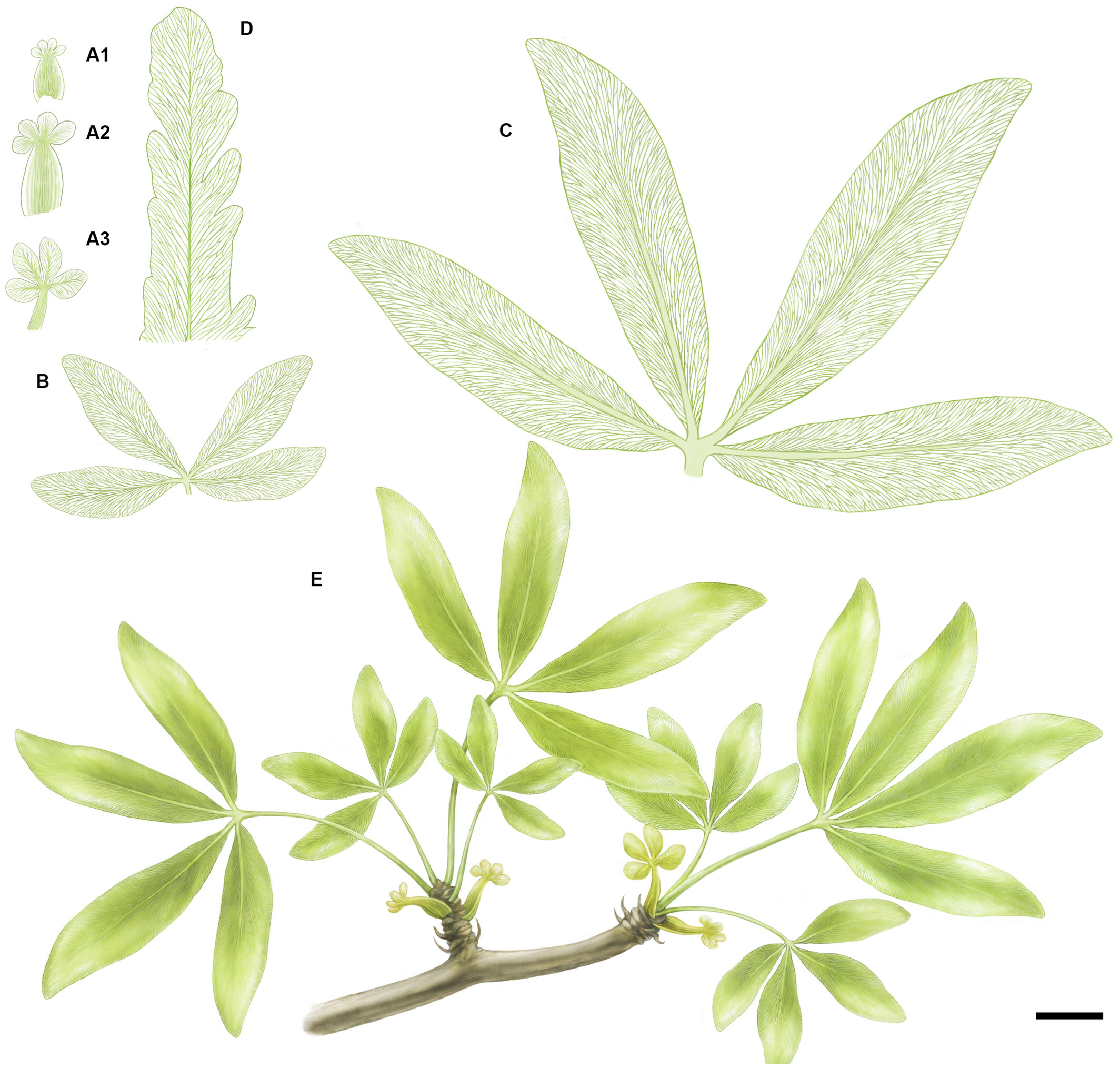
Illustration showing change in leaf shape of Sagenopteris acuminata during growth, and mature and small immature leaves attached to woody stem

The most common and widespread part found fossilized are leaves of Sagenopteris (Fig. 3). These are compound leaves consisting of, usually, 4 leaflets (two pairs of two) arrayed in a palmate manner, with the leaflets having a prominent midrib and a generally lanceolate shape. The bases of the four leaflets were attached to the apex of a petiole, which at its other end joined a woody stem. The individual leaflets are up to 6 cm in length. The leaflets have anastomosing veins, like those of some ferns, but lacking orders of venation found in angiosperm leaves.

== Relationship to other seed plants ==
Caytonia was first described by Hamshaw Thomas in 1925. His close examination of the cupules led him to believe this was one of the earliest examples of angiosperms. He mistakenly thought the entire ovule was enclosed in the cupule, unlike typical gymnosperms. He worked meticulously, collecting and cleaning specimens to get the best understanding. He spent weeks boiling fruits in different solutions to try to make them resemble their living states. He proposed that the fruits contained a stigma with a funnel-shaped opening in the center in which the pollen grains would get lodged. The entire pollen grain would not be able to enter into the ovule, a defining trait in angiosperms. This theory was disproved 1933 by Thomas's student Tom Harris, who studied the same reproductive organs and found different results. "Most of the fruits were obtained by dissolving in hydrofluoric acid a single very small fragment of shale collected from Cape Stewart," he wrote. The maceration of the fruits dissolves the main cell's wall and leaves the cuticle and interior cell organs. This allowed Harris to look closely at the ovules located inside. Upon close inspection of the ovule, whole pollen grains were found inside the micropylar canal. This is typical of a gymnosperm reproduction, not an angiosperm. Presumably pollination was at an early stage of cupule and ovule development, before full inflation of the cupules. While Thomas's original idea led many scientists to believe that Caytoniales may have been angiosperms, Harris's further research disproved this theory.

The enclosure of ovules in Caytoniales has nevertheless been considered an early stage in evolution of the angiosperm double integument, and the carpels formed from an elaboration of their stalk (Fig. 5). Other theories for the origin of angiosperms derive them from Glossopteridales (Fig.5), among other groups (see Evolutionary history of plants).

Beyond flowering plants, some authors have suggested that they may be related to the glossopterids and the corystosperms, possibly as part of a broader clade including flowering plants.

== Evolutionary history ==
As recorded by fossils of Sagenopteris leaves, the most common fossils of Caytoniales, the earliest fossils of the group are from the Anisian stage of the Middle Triassic of what is now Europe. In the Late Triassic, the Caytoniales expanded their distribution to become widespread across Pangaea. Caytoniales were apparently not significantly effected by the end-Triassic mass extinction, and remained widespread during the entirety of the Jurassic epoch, reaching the apex of their abundance during this period. The group declined during the Late Jurassic and Early Cretaceous, likely due at least in part to the rise of flowering plants during the Cretaceous period. During the Late Cretaceous, they were primarily confined to high latitudes in the Northern Hemisphere, mirroring the decline and geographic contraction of other prominent Mesozoic seed plant groups such as the Bennettitales. The youngest records of Sagenopteris, and more broadly of Caytoniales, date to the Campanian stage towards the end of the epoch.

== Gallery ==
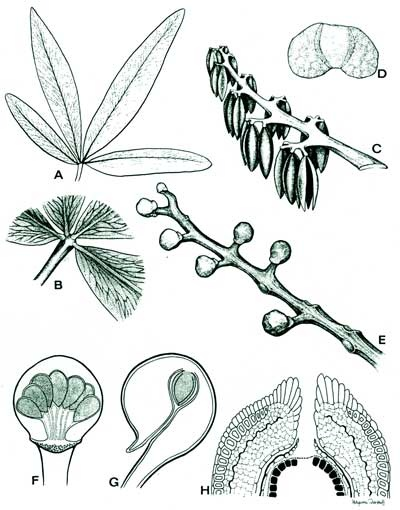
Fig. 2 A) leaf structure B) Venation C) Pollen sacs D) Pollen grain E) Seed structure F) Cupule G) Cupule from side H) Ovule

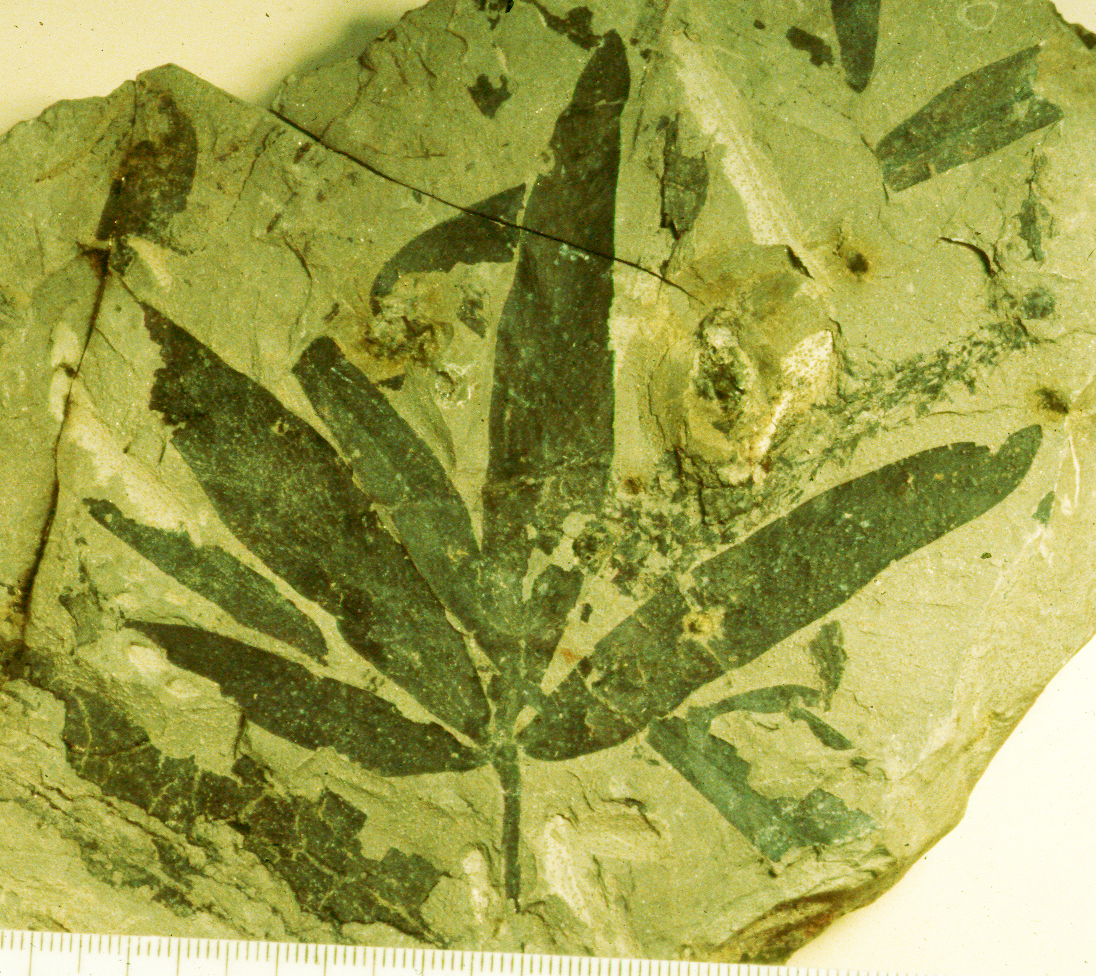
Fig. 3 Fossil leaves of Sagenopteris phillipsii from the Gristhorpe Bed at Cayton Bay. Natural History Museum specimen photographed by G.J.Retallack

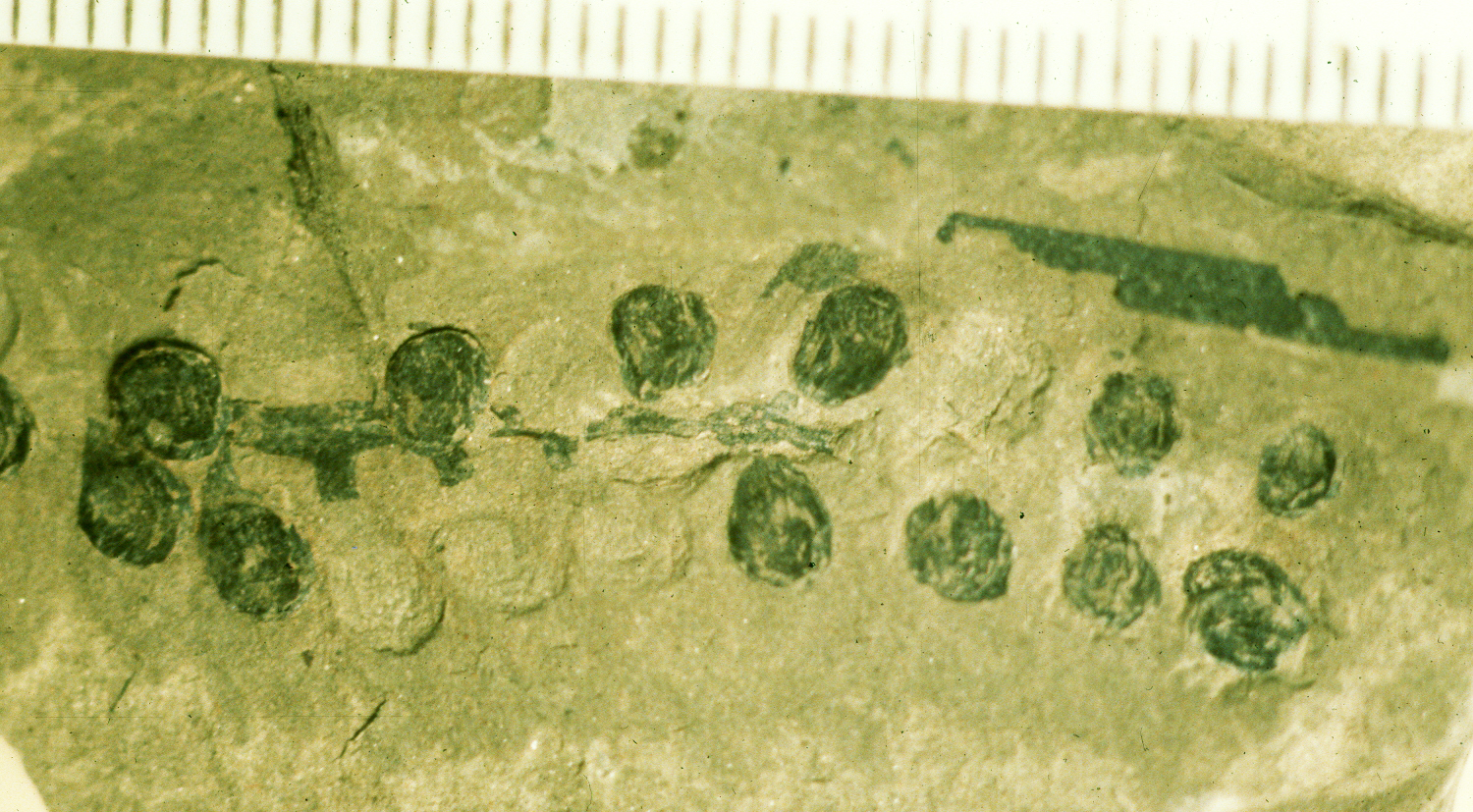
Fig. 4 Fossil Caytonia nathorstii, the reproductive structure that encloses ovules. Natural History Museum specimen photographed by G.J. Retallack.

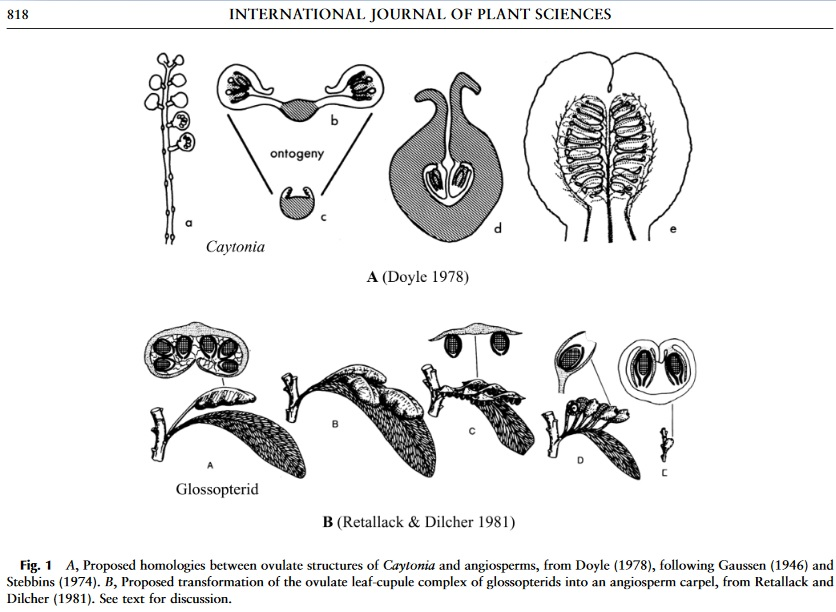
Fig. 5 Diagram comparing ovulate structures in Caytoniales, Glossopteridales, and Angiospermae. The upper illustrations show Caytoniales as angiosperm ancestors, and the lower illustrations show glossopterid ancestors.
