= Evolutionary history of plants =

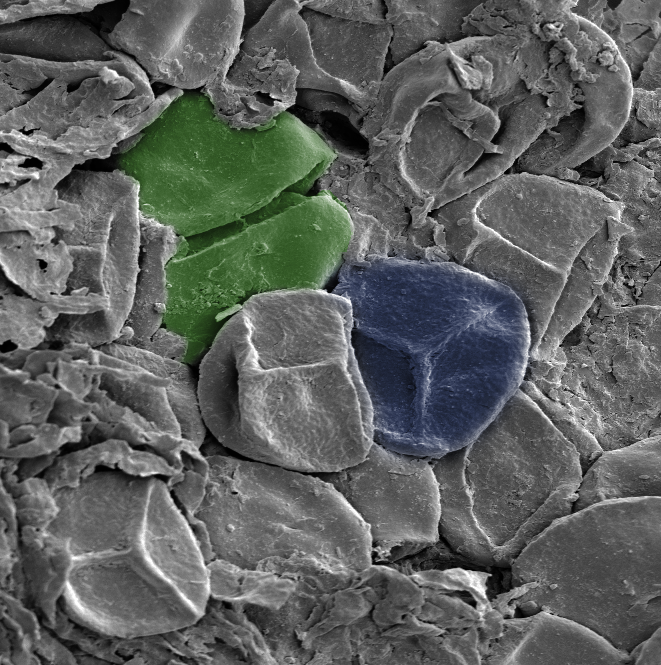
A late Silurian sporangium, artificially colored. Green: A spore tetrad. Blue: A spore bearing a trilete mark – the Y-shaped scar. The spores are about 30–35 μm across.

The evolution of plants has resulted in a wide range of complexity, from the earliest algal mats of unicellular archaeplastids evolved through endosymbiosis, through multicellular marine and freshwater green algae, to spore-bearing terrestrial bryophytes, lycopods and ferns, and eventually to the complex seed-bearing gymnosperms and angiosperms (flowering plants) of today. While many of the earliest groups continue to thrive, as exemplified by red and green algae in marine environments, more recently derived groups have displaced previously ecologically dominant ones; for example, the ascendance of flowering plants over gymnosperms in terrestrial environments.

There is evidence that cyanobacteria and multicellular thalloid eukaryotes lived in freshwater communities on land as early as 1 billion years ago, and that communities of complex, multicellular photosynthesizing organisms existed on land in the late Precambrian, around 850 million years ago.

Evidence of the emergence of embryophyte land plants first occurs in the middle Ordovician (~470 million years ago). By the middle of the Devonian (~390 million years ago), fossil evidence has shown that many of the features recognised in land plants today were present, including roots and leaves. More recently geochemical evidence suggests that around this time that the terrestrial realm had largely been colonized which altered the global terrestrial weathering environment. By the late Devonian (~370 million years ago) some free-sporing plants such as Archaeopteris had secondary vascular tissue that produced wood and had formed forests of tall trees. Also by the late Devonian, Elkinsia, an early seed fern, had evolved seeds. Evolutionary innovation continued throughout the rest of the Phanerozoic eon and still continues today. Most plant groups were relatively unscathed by the Permo-Triassic extinction event, although the structures of communities changed. This may have set the scene for the appearance of the flowering plants in the Triassic (~200 million years ago), and their later diversification in the Cretaceous and Paleogene. The latest major group of plants to evolve were the grasses, which became important in the mid-Paleogene, from around 40 million years ago. The grasses, as well as many other groups, evolved new mechanisms of metabolism to survive the low CO_{2} and warm, dry conditions of the tropics over the last 10 million years.

== Colonization of land ==
=== Divergence ===
Land plants evolved from a group of freshwater green algae, perhaps as early as 850 mya, but algae-like plants might have evolved as early as 1 billion years ago. The closest living relatives of land plants are the charophytes, specifically Charales; if modern Charales are similar to the distant ancestors they share with land plants, this means that the land plants evolved from a branched, filamentous alga dwelling in shallow fresh water, perhaps at the edge of seasonally desiccating pools. However, some recent evidence suggests that land plants might have originated from unicellular terrestrial charophytes similar to extant Klebsormidiophyceae. The alga would have had a haplontic life cycle. It would only very briefly have had paired chromosomes (the diploid condition) when the egg and sperm first fused to form a zygote that would have immediately divided by meiosis to produce cells with half the number of unpaired chromosomes (the haploid condition). Co-operative interactions with fungi may have helped early plants adapt to the stresses of the terrestrial realm.

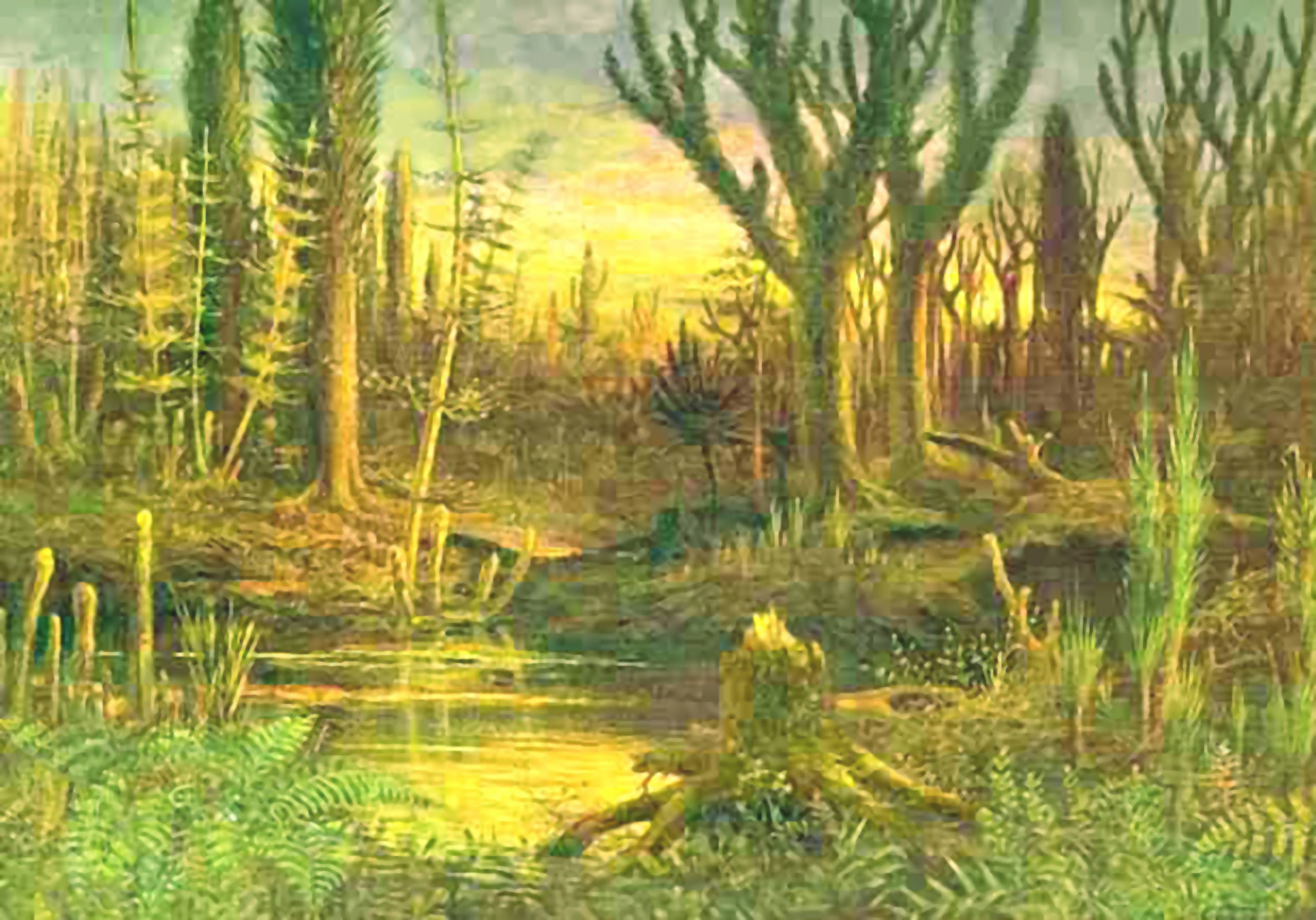
The Devonian marks the beginning of extensive land colonization by plants, which – through their effects on erosion and sedimentation – brought about significant climatic change.

=== Challenges to land colonization ===
Plants were not the first photosynthesisers on land. Weathering rates suggest that organisms capable of photosynthesis were already living on the land 1,200 million years ago, and microbial fossils have been found in freshwater lake deposits from 1,000 million years ago, but the carbon isotope record suggests that they were too scarce to impact the atmospheric composition until around 850 million years ago. These organisms, although phylogenetically diverse, were probably small and simple, forming little more than an algal scum.

Since lichens initiate the first step in primary ecological succession in contemporary contexts, one hypothesis has been that lichens came on land first and facilitated colonization by plants; however, both molecular phylogenies and the fossil record seem to contradict this.

There are multiple potential reasons for why it took so long for land plants to emerge. It could be that atmospheric "poisoning" prevented eukaryotes from colonising the land prior to the emergence of land plants, or it could simply have taken a great time for the necessary complexity to evolve. A major challenge to land adaptation would have been the absence of appropriate soil.

=== Adaptations to land colonization ===
Evidence of the earliest land plants occurs at about 470 million years ago, in lower middle Ordovician rocks from Saudi Arabia and Gondwana in the form of spores known as cryptospores. These spores have walls made of sporopollenin, an extremely decay-resistant material that means they are well-preserved by the fossil record. These spores were produced either singly (monads), in pairs (dyads) or groups of four (tetrads), and their microstructure resembles that of modern liverwort spores, suggesting they share an equivalent grade of organisation. Their walls contain sporopollenin – further evidence of an embryophytic affinity.

Trilete spores similar to those of vascular plants appear soon afterwards, in Upper Ordovician rocks about 455 million years ago. Depending exactly when the tetrad splits, each of the four spores may bear a "trilete mark", a Y-shape, reflecting the points at which each cell squashed up against its neighbours. However, this requires that the spore walls be sturdy and resistant at an early stage. This resistance is closely associated with having a desiccation-resistant outer wall—a trait only of use when spores must survive out of water. Indeed, even those embryophytes that have returned to the water lack a resistant wall, thus don't bear trilete marks. A close examination of algal spores shows that none have trilete spores, either because their walls are not resistant enough, or, in those rare cases where they are, because the spores disperse before they are compressed enough to develop the mark or do not fit into a tetrahedral tetrad.

The earliest megafossils of land plants were thalloid organisms, which dwelt in fluvial wetlands and are found to have covered most of an early Silurian flood plain. They could only survive when the land was waterlogged. There were also microbial mats.

Once plants had reached the land, there were two approaches to dealing with desiccation. Modern bryophytes either avoid it or give in to it, restricting their ranges to moist settings or drying out and putting their metabolism "on hold" until more water arrives, as in the liverwort genus Targionia. Tracheophytes resist desiccation by controlling the rate of water loss. They all bear a waterproof outer cuticle layer wherever they are exposed to air (as do some bryophytes), to reduce water loss, but since a total covering would cut them off from CO_{2} in the atmosphere tracheophytes use variable openings, the stomata, to regulate the rate of gas exchange. Tracheophytes also developed vascular tissue to aid in the movement of water within the organisms (see below), and moved away from a gametophyte dominated life cycle (see below). Vascular tissue ultimately also facilitated upright growth without the support of water and paved the way for the evolution of larger plants on land.

=== Consequences ===
A global glaciation event called Snowball Earth, from around 720-635 mya in the Cryogenian period, is believed to have been at least partially caused by early photosynthetic organisms, which reduced the concentration of carbon dioxide and decreased the greenhouse effect in the atmosphere, leading to an icehouse climate. Based on molecular clock studies of the previous decade or so, a 2022 study observed that the estimated time for the origin of the multicellular streptophytes (all except the unicellular basal clade Mesostigmatophyceae) fell in the cool Cryogenian while that of the subsequent separation of streptophytes fell in the warm Ediacaran, which they interpreted as an indication of selective pressure by the glacial period to the photosynthesizing organisms, a group of which succeeded in surviving in relatively warmer environments that remained habitable, subsequently flourishing in the later Ediacaran and Phanerozoic on land as embryophytes. The study also theorized that the unicellular morphology and other unique features of the Zygnematophyceae may reflect further adaptations to a cold loving life style. The establishment of a land-based flora increased the rate of accumulation of oxygen in the atmosphere, as the land plants produced oxygen as a waste product. When this concentration rose above 13%, around 0.45 billion years ago, wildfires became possible, evident from charcoal in the fossil record.

== Evolution of life cycles ==
Angiosperm life cycle

All multicellular plants have a life cycle comprising two generations or phases. The gametophyte phase is haploid with a single set of chromosomes (denoted 1n) and produces gametes (sperm and eggs). The sporophyte phase is diploid with paired chromosomes (denoted 2n), and produces spores. The gametophyte and sporophyte phases may be homomorphic, appearing identical in some algae, such as Ulva lactuca, but are very different in all modern land plants, a condition known as heteromorphy.

The pattern in plant evolution has been a shift from homomorphy to heteromorphy. The algal ancestors of land plants were almost certainly haplobiontic, being haploid for all their life cycles, with a unicellular zygote providing the 2N stage. All land plants (i.e. embryophytes) are diplobiontic – that is, both the haploid and diploid stages are multicellular. Two trends are apparent: bryophytes (liverworts, mosses and hornworts) have developed the gametophyte as the dominant phase of the life cycle, with the sporophyte becoming almost entirely dependent on it; vascular plants have developed the sporophyte as the dominant phase, with the gametophytes being particularly reduced in the seed plants.

It has been proposed as the basis for the emergence of the diploid phase of the life cycle as the dominant phase that diploidy allows masking of the expression of deleterious mutations through genetic complementation. Thus if one of the parental genomes in the diploid cells contains mutations leading to defects in one or more gene products, these deficiencies could be compensated for by the other parental genome (which nevertheless may have its own defects in other genes). As the diploid phase was becoming predominant, the masking effect likely allowed genome size, and hence information content, to increase without the constraint of having to improve accuracy of replication. The opportunity to increase information content at low cost is advantageous because it permits new adaptations to be encoded. This view has been challenged, with evidence showing that selection is no more effective in the haploid than in the diploid phases of the lifecycle of mosses and angiosperms.

There are two competing theories to explain the appearance of a diplobiontic lifecycle.

The interpolation theory (also known as the antithetic or intercalary theory) holds that the interpolation of a multicellular sporophyte phase between two successive gametophyte generations was an innovation caused by preceding meiosis in a freshly germinated zygote with one or more rounds of mitotic division, thereby producing some diploid multicellular tissue before finally meiosis produced spores. This theory implies that the first sporophytes bore a very different and simpler morphology to the gametophyte they depended on. This seems to fit well with what is known of the bryophytes, in which a vegetative thalloid gametophyte nurtures a simple sporophyte, which consists of little more than an unbranched sporangium on a stalk. Increasing complexity of the ancestrally simple sporophyte, including the eventual acquisition of photosynthetic cells, would free it from its dependence on a gametophyte, as seen in some hornworts (Anthoceros), and eventually result in the sporophyte developing organs and vascular tissue, and becoming the dominant phase, as in the tracheophytes (vascular plants). This theory may be supported by observations that smaller Cooksonia individuals must have been supported by a gametophyte generation. The observed appearance of larger axial sizes, with room for photosynthetic tissue and thus self-sustainability, provides a possible route for the development of a self-sufficient sporophyte phase.

The alternative hypothesis, called the transformation theory (or homologous theory), posits that the sporophyte might have appeared suddenly by delaying the occurrence of meiosis until a fully developed multicellular sporophyte had formed. Since the same genetic material would be employed by both the haploid and diploid phases, they would look the same. This explains the behaviour of some algae, such as Ulva lactuca, which produce alternating phases of identical sporophytes and gametophytes. Subsequent adaption to the desiccating land environment, which makes sexual reproduction difficult, might have resulted in the simplification of the sexually active gametophyte, and elaboration of the sporophyte phase to better disperse the waterproof spores. The tissue of sporophytes and gametophytes of vascular plants such as Rhynia preserved in the Rhynie chert is of similar complexity, which is taken to support this hypothesis. By contrast, modern vascular plants, with the exception of Psilotum, have heteromorphic sporophytes and gametophytes in which the gametophytes rarely have any vascular tissue.

== Evolution of plant anatomy ==
=== Arbuscular mycorrhizal symbiosis ===
There is no evidence that early land plants of the Silurian and early Devonian had roots, although fossil evidence of rhizoids occurs for several species, such as Horneophyton. The earliest land plants did not have vascular systems for transport of water and nutrients either. Aglaophyton, a rootless vascular plant known from Devonian fossils in the Rhynie chert was the first land plant discovered to have had a symbiotic relationship with fungi which formed arbuscular mycorrhizas, literally "tree-like fungal roots", in a well-defined cylinder of cells (ring in cross section) in the cortex of its stems. The fungi fed on the plant's sugars, in exchange for nutrients generated or extracted from the soil (especially phosphate), to which the plant would otherwise have had no access. Like other rootless land plants of the Silurian and early Devonian Aglaophyton may have relied on arbuscular mycorrhizal fungi for acquisition of water and nutrients from the soil.

The fungi were of the phylum Glomeromycota, a group that probably first appeared 1 billion years ago and still forms arbuscular mycorrhizal associations today with all major land plant groups from bryophytes to pteridophytes, gymnosperms and angiosperms and with more than 80% of vascular plants.

Evidence from DNA sequence analysis indicates that the arbuscular mycorrhizal mutualism arose in the common ancestor of these land plant groups during their transition to land and it may even have been the critical step that enabled them to colonise the land. Appearing as they did before these plants had evolved roots, mycorrhizal fungi would have assisted plants in the acquisition of water and mineral nutrients such as phosphorus, in exchange for organic compounds which they could not synthesize themselves. Such fungi increase the productivity even of simple plants such as liverworts.

=== Cuticle, stomata and intercellular spaces ===
To photosynthesise, plants must absorb CO_{2} from the atmosphere. However, making the tissues available for CO_{2} to enter allows water to evaporate, so this comes at a price. Water is lost much faster than CO_{2} is absorbed, so plants need to replace it. Early land plants transported water apoplastically, within the porous walls of their cells. Later, they evolved three anatomical features that provided the ability to control the inevitable water loss that accompanied CO_{2} acquisition. First, a waterproof outer covering or cuticle evolved that reduced water loss. Secondly, variable apertures, the stomata that could open and close to regulate the amount of water lost by evaporation during CO_{2} uptake and thirdly intercellular space between photosynthetic parenchyma cells that allowed improved internal distribution of the CO_{2} to the chloroplasts. This three-part system provided improved homoiohydry, the regulation of water content of the tissues, providing a particular advantage when water supply is not constant. The high CO_{2} concentrations of the Silurian and early Devonian, when plants were first colonising land, meant that they used water relatively efficiently. As CO_{2} was withdrawn from the atmosphere by plants, more water was lost in its capture, and more elegant water acquisition and transport mechanisms evolved. Plants growing upwards into the air needed a system for transporting water from the soil to all the different parts of the above-soil plant, especially to photosynthesising parts. By the end of the Carboniferous, when CO_{2} concentrations had been reduced to something approaching that of today, around 17 times more water was lost per unit of CO_{2} uptake. However, even in the "easy" early days, water was always at a premium, and had to be transported to parts of the plant from the wet soil to avoid desiccation.

Water can be wicked by capillary action along a fabric with small spaces. In narrow columns of water, such as those within the plant cell walls or in tracheids, when molecules evaporate from one end, they pull the molecules behind them along the channels. Therefore, evaporation alone provides the driving force for water transport in plants. However, without specialized transport vessels, this cohesion-tension mechanism can cause negative pressures sufficient to collapse water conducting cells, limiting the transport water to no more than a few cm, and therefore limiting the size of the earliest plants.

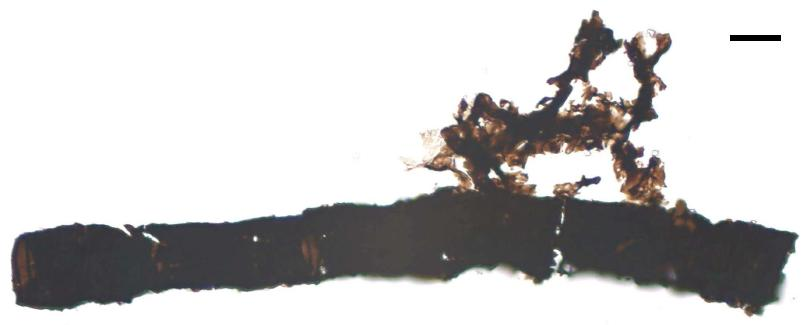
A banded tube from the Late Silurian/Early Devonian. The bands are difficult to see on this specimen, as an opaque carbonaceous coating conceals much of the tube. Bands are just visible in places on the left half of the image. Scale bar: 20 μm

=== Xylem ===
To be free from the constraints of small size and constant moisture that the parenchymatic transport system inflicted, plants needed a more efficient water transport system. As plants grew upwards, specialised water transport vascular tissues evolved, first in the form of simple hydroids of the type found in the setae of moss sporophytes. These simple elongated cells were dead and water-filled at maturity, providing a channel for water transport, but their thin, unreinforced walls would collapse under modest water tension, limiting the plant height. Xylem tracheids, wider cells with lignin-reinforced cell walls that were more resistant to collapse under the tension caused by water stress, occur in more than one plant group by mid-Silurian, and may have a single evolutionary origin, possibly within the hornworts, uniting all tracheophytes. Alternatively, they may have evolved more than once. Much later, in the Cretaceous, tracheids were followed by vessels in flowering plants. As water transport mechanisms and waterproof cuticles evolved, plants could survive without being continually covered by a film of water. This transition from poikilohydry to homoiohydry opened up new potential for colonisation.

The early Devonian pretracheophytes Aglaophyton and Horneophyton have unreinforced water transport tubes with wall structures very similar to moss hydroids, but they grew alongside several species of tracheophytes, such as Rhynia gwynne-vaughanii that had xylem tracheids that were well reinforced by bands of lignin. The earliest macrofossils known to have xylem tracheids are small, mid-Silurian plants of the genus Cooksonia. However, thickened bands on the walls of isolated tube fragments are apparent from the early Silurian onwards.

Plants continued to innovate ways of reducing the resistance to flow within their cells, progressively increasing the efficiency of their water transport and to increase the resistance of the tracheids to collapse under tension. During the early Devonian, maximum tracheid diameter increased with time, but may have plateaued in the zosterophylls by mid-Devonian. Overall transport rate also depends on the overall cross-sectional area of the xylem bundle itself, and some mid-Devonian plants, such as the Trimerophytes, had much larger steles than their early ancestors. While wider tracheids provided higher rates of water transport, they increased the risk of cavitation, the formation of air bubbles resulting from the breakage of the water column under tension. Small pits in tracheid walls allow water to by-pass a defective tracheid while preventing air bubbles from passing through but at the cost of restricted flow rates. By the Carboniferous, Gymnosperms had developed bordered pits, valve-like structures that allow high-conductivity pits to seal when one side of a tracheid is depressurized.

Tracheids have non-perforated end walls with pits, which impose a great deal of resistance on water flow, but may have had the advantage of isolating air embolisms caused by cavitation or freezing. Vessels first evolved during the dry, low CO_{2} periods of the Late Permian, in the horsetails, ferns and Selaginellales independently, and later appeared in the mid Cretaceous in gnetophytes and angiosperms. Vessel members are open tubes with no end walls, and are arranged end to end to operate as if they were one continuous vessel. Vessels allowed the same cross-sectional area of wood to transport much more water than tracheids. This allowed plants to fill more of their stems with structural fibres and also opened a new niche to vines, which could transport water without being as thick as the tree they grew on. Despite these advantages, tracheid-based wood is a lot lighter, thus cheaper to make, as vessels need to be much more reinforced to avoid cavitation. Once plants had evolved this level of control over water evaporation and water transport, they were truly homoiohydric, able to extract water from their environment through root-like organs rather than relying on a film of surface moisture, enabling them to grow to much greater size but as a result of their increased independence from their surroundings, most vascular plants lost their ability to survive desiccation – a costly trait to lose. In early land plants, support was mainly provided by turgor pressure, particularly of the outer layer of cells known as the sterome tracheids, and not by the xylem, which was too small, too weak and in too central a position to provide much structural support. Plants with secondary xylem that had appeared by mid-Devonian, such as the Trimerophytes and Progymnosperms had much larger vascular cross sections producing strong woody tissue.

=== Endodermis ===
An endodermis may have evolved in the earliest plant roots during the Devonian, but the first fossil evidence for such a structure is Carboniferous. The endodermis in the roots surrounds the water transport tissue and regulates ion exchange between the groundwater and the tissues and prevents unwanted pathogens etc. from entering the water transport system. The endodermis can also provide an upwards pressure, forcing water out of the roots when transpiration is not enough of a driver.

== Evolution of plant morphology ==
=== Leaves ===
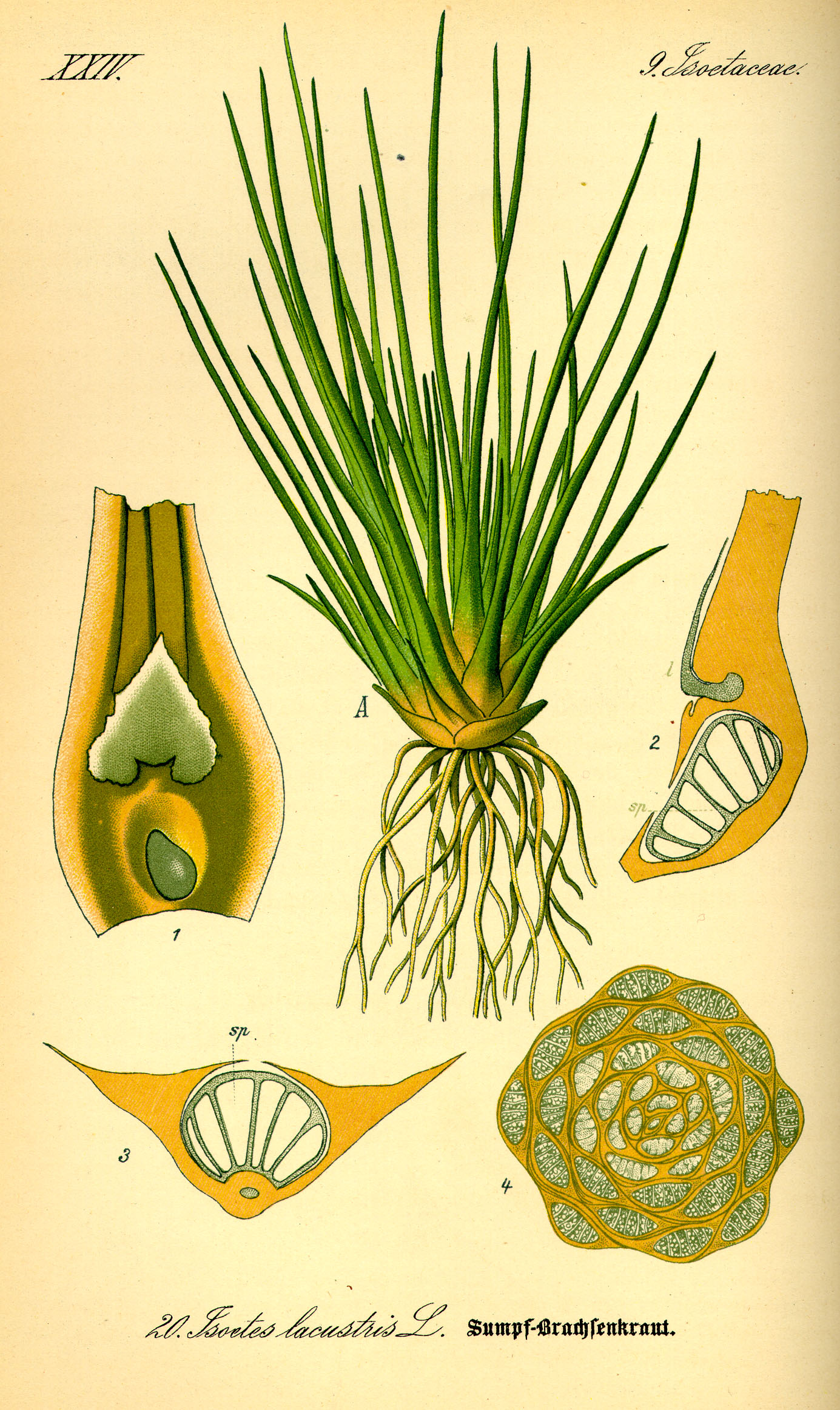
The lycopod Isoetes bears microphylls (leaves with a single vascular trace).

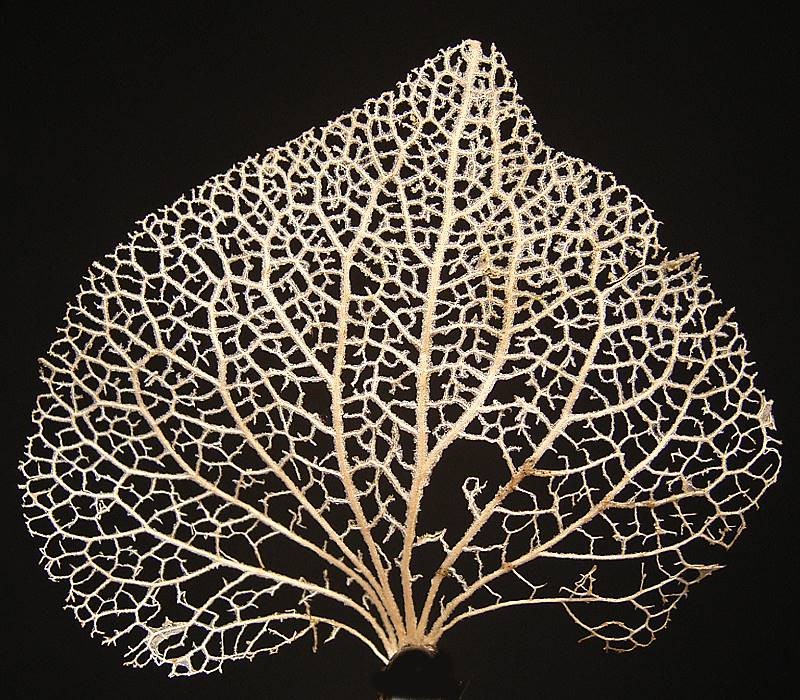
The branching pattern of megaphyll veins may indicate their origin as webbed, dichotomising branches.

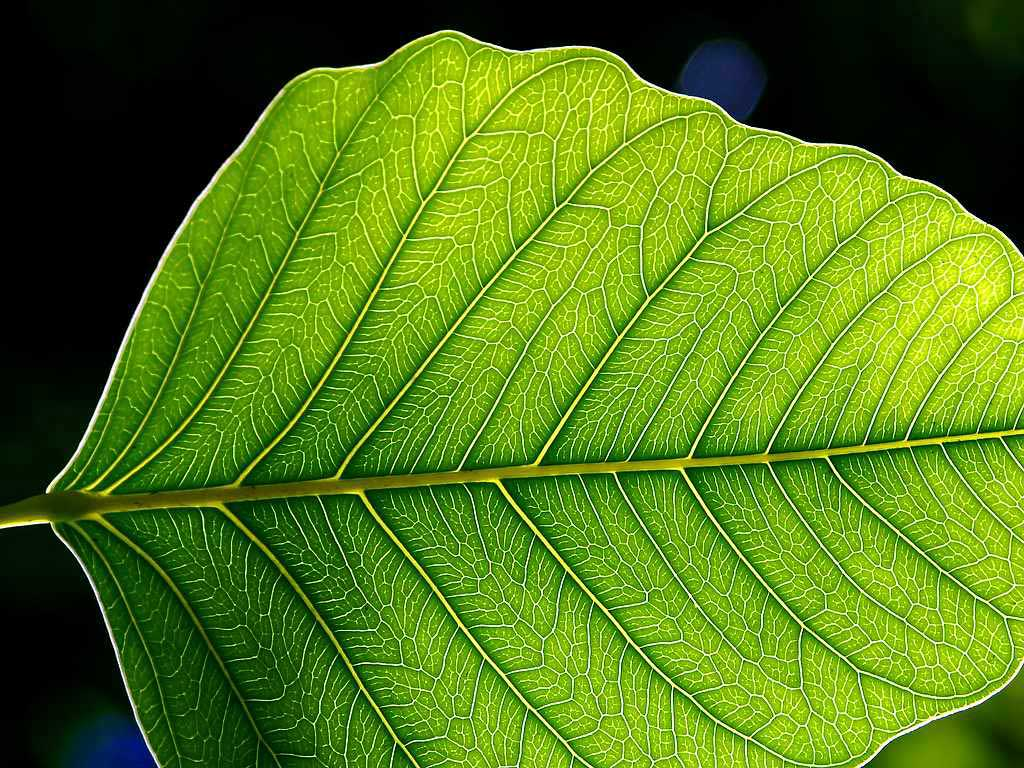
Leaf lamina. The megaphyllous leaf architecture arose multiple times in different plant lineages

Leaves are the primary photosynthetic organs of a modern plant. The origin of leaves was almost certainly triggered by falling concentrations of atmospheric CO_{2} during the Devonian period, increasing the efficiency with which carbon dioxide could be captured for photosynthesis.

Leaves evolved more than once. Based on their structure, they are classified into two types: microphylls, which lack complex venation and may have originated as spiny outgrowths known as enations, and megaphylls, which are large and have complex venation that may have arisen from the modification of groups of branches. It has been proposed that these structures arose independently. Megaphylls, according to Walter Zimmerman's telome theory, have evolved from plants that showed a three-dimensional branching architecture, through three transformations—overtopping, which led to the lateral position typical of leaves, planation, which involved formation of a planar architecture, webbing or fusion, which united the planar branches, thus leading to the formation of a proper leaf lamina. All three steps happened multiple times in the evolution of today's leaves.

It is widely believed that the telome theory is well supported by fossil evidence. However, Wolfgang Hagemann questioned it for morphological and ecological reasons and proposed an alternative theory. Whereas according to the telome theory the most primitive land plants have a three-dimensional branching system of radially symmetrical axes (telomes), according to Hagemann's alternative the opposite is proposed: the most primitive land plants that gave rise to vascular plants were flat, thalloid, leaf-like, without axes, somewhat like a liverwort or fern prothallus. Axes such as stems and roots evolved later as new organs. Rolf Sattler proposed an overarching process-oriented view that leaves some limited room for both the telome theory and Hagemann's alternative and in addition takes into consideration the whole continuum between dorsiventral (flat) and radial (cylindrical) structures that can be found in fossil and living land plants. This view is supported by research in molecular genetics. Thus, James (2009) concluded that "it is now widely accepted that... radiality [characteristic of axes such as stems] and dorsiventrality [characteristic of leaves] are but extremes of a continuous spectrum. In fact, it is simply the timing of the KNOX gene expression".

Before the evolution of leaves, plants had the photosynthetic apparatus on the stems, which they retain albeit leaves have largely assumed that job. Today's megaphyll leaves probably became commonplace some 360mya, about 40my after the simple leafless plants had colonized the land in the Early Devonian. This spread has been linked to the fall in the atmospheric carbon dioxide concentrations in the Late Paleozoic era associated with a rise in density of stomata on leaf surface. This would have resulted in greater transpiration rates and gas exchange, but especially at high CO_{2} concentrations, large leaves with fewer stomata would have heated to lethal temperatures in full sunlight. Increasing the stomatal density allowed for a better-cooled leaf, thus making its spread feasible, but increased CO_{2} uptake at the expense of decreased water use efficiency.

The rhyniophytes of the Rhynie chert consisted only of slender, unornamented axes. The early to middle Devonian trimerophytes may be considered leafy. This group of vascular plants are recognisable by their masses of terminal sporangia, which adorn the ends of axes which may bifurcate or trifurcate. Some organisms, such as Psilophyton, bore enations. These are small, spiny outgrowths of the stem, lacking their own vascular supply.

The zosterophylls were already important in the late Silurian, much earlier than any rhyniophytes of comparable complexity. This group, recognisable by their kidney-shaped sporangia which grew on short lateral branches close to the main axes, sometimes branched in a distinctive H-shape. Many zosterophylls bore enations (small tissue outgrowths on the surface with variable morphologies) on their axes but none of these had a vascular trace. The first evidence of vascularised enations occurs in a fossil clubmoss known as Baragwanathia that had already appeared in the fossil record in the Late Silurian. In this organism, these leaf traces continue into the leaf to form their mid-vein. One theory, the "enation theory", holds that the microphyllous leaves of clubmosses developed by outgrowths of the protostele connecting with existing enations The leaves of the Rhynie genus Asteroxylon, which was preserved in the Rhynie chert almost 20 million years later than Baragwanathia, had a primitive vascular supply – in the form of leaf traces departing from the central protostele towards each individual "leaf". Asteroxylon and Baragwanathia are widely regarded as primitive lycopods, a group still extant today, represented by the quillworts, the spikemosses and the club mosses. Lycopods bear distinctive microphylls, defined as leaves with a single vascular trace. Microphylls could grow to some size, those of Lepidodendrales reaching over a meter in length, but almost all just bear the one vascular bundle. An exception is the rare branching in some Selaginella species.

The more familiar leaves, megaphylls, are thought to have originated four times independently: in the ferns, horsetails, progymnosperms and seed plants. They appear to have originated by modifying dichotomising branches, which first overlapped (or "overtopped") one another, became flattened or planated and eventually developed "webbing" and evolved gradually into more leaf-like structures. Megaphylls, by Zimmerman's telome theory, are composed of a group of webbed branches and hence the "leaf gap" left where the leaf's vascular bundle leaves that of the main branch resembles two axes splitting. In each of the four groups to evolve megaphylls, their leaves first evolved during the Late Devonian to Early Carboniferous, diversifying rapidly until the designs settled down in the mid Carboniferous.

The cessation of further diversification can be attributed to developmental constraints, raising the question of why it took so long for leaves to evolve in the first place. Plants had been on land for at least 50 million years before megaphylls became significant. However, small, rare mesophylls are known from the early Devonian genus Eophyllophyton – so development could not have been a barrier to their appearance. The best explanation so far is that atmospheric CO_{2} was declining rapidly during this time – falling by around 90% during the Devonian. This required an increase in stomatal density by 100 times to maintain the rate of photosynthesis. When stomata open to allow water to evaporate from leaves it has a cooling effect, resulting from the loss of latent heat of evaporation. It appears that the low stomatal density in the early Devonian meant that evaporation and evaporative cooling were limited, and that leaves would have overheated if they grew to any size. The stomatal density could not increase, as the primitive steles and limited root systems would not be able to supply water quickly enough to match the rate of transpiration. Clearly, leaves are not always beneficial, as illustrated by the frequent occurrence of secondary loss of leaves, exemplified by cacti and the "whisk fern" Psilotum.

Secondary evolution can disguise the true evolutionary origin of some leaves. Some genera of ferns display complex leaves which are attached to the pseudostele by an outgrowth of the vascular bundle, leaving no leaf gap.

Deciduous trees deal with another disadvantage to having leaves. The popular belief that plants shed their leaves when the days get too short is misguided; evergreens prospered in the Arctic Circle during the most recent greenhouse earth. The generally accepted reason for shedding leaves during winter is to cope with the weather – the force of wind and weight of snow are much more comfortably weathered without leaves to increase surface area. Seasonal leaf loss has evolved independently several times and is exhibited in the ginkgoales, some pinophyta and certain angiosperms. Leaf loss may also have arisen as a response to pressure from insects; it may have been less costly to lose leaves entirely during the winter or dry season than to continue investing resources in their repair.

=== Roots ===
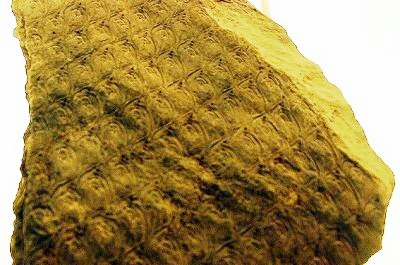
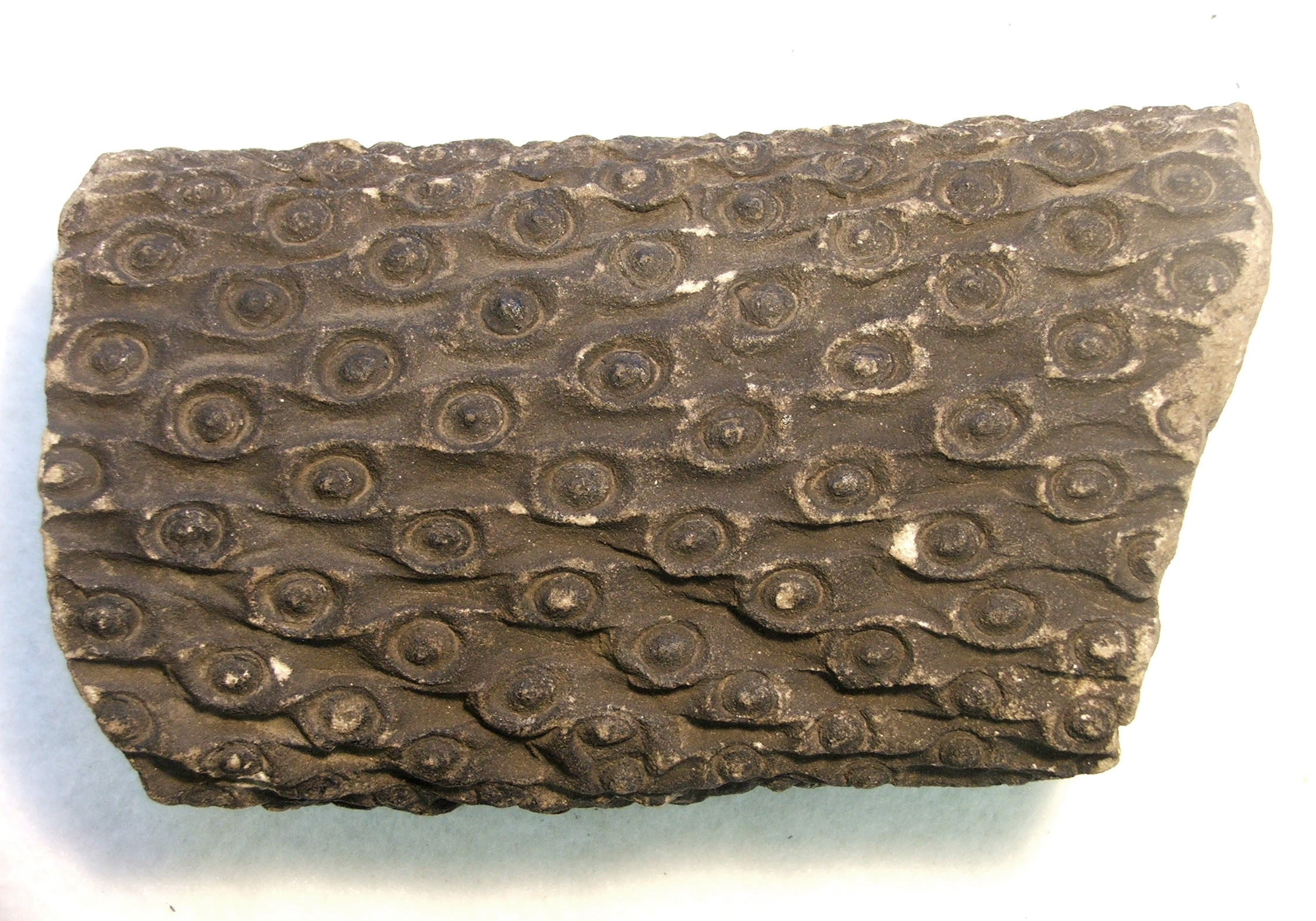
The rhizomes (Stigmaria) (bottom image) of lycopsids (including the Carboniferous Lepidodendrales) are thought to be developmentally equivalent to the stems (top), as the similar appearance of "leaf scars" and "root scars" on these specimens from different species demonstrates.

The evolution of roots had consequences on a global scale. By disturbing the soil and promoting its acidification (by taking up nutrients such as nitrate and phosphate), they enabled it to weather more deeply, injecting carbon compounds deeper into soils with huge implications for climate. These effects may have been so profound they led to a mass extinction.

While there are traces of root-like impressions in fossil soils in the Late Silurian, body fossils show the earliest plants to be devoid of roots. Many had prostrate branches that sprawled along the ground, with upright axes or thalli dotted here and there, and some even had non-photosynthetic subterranean branches which lacked stomata. Roots have a root cap, unlike specialised branches. So while Siluro-Devonian plants such as Rhynia and Horneophyton possessed the physiological equivalent of roots, roots – defined as organs differentiated from stems – did not arrive until later. Unfortunately, roots are rarely preserved in the fossil record.

Rhizoids – small structures performing the same role as roots, usually a cell in diameter – probably evolved very early, perhaps even before plants colonised the land; they are recognised in the Characeae, an algal sister group to land plants. That said, rhizoids probably evolved more than once; the rhizines of lichens, for example, perform a similar role. Even some animals (Lamellibrachia) have root-like structures. Rhizoids are clearly visible in the Rhynie chert fossils, and were present in most of the earliest vascular plants, and on this basis seem to have presaged true plant roots.

More advanced structures are common in the Rhynie chert, and many other fossils of comparable early Devonian age bear structures that look like, and acted like, roots. The rhyniophytes bore fine rhizoids, and the trimerophytes and herbaceous lycopods of the chert bore root-like structure penetrating a few centimetres into the soil. However, none of these fossils display all the features borne by modern roots, with the exception of Asteroxylon, which has recently been recognized as bearing roots that evolved independently from those of extant vascular plants. Roots and root-like structures became increasingly common and deeper penetrating during the Devonian, with lycopod trees forming roots around 20 cm long during the Eifelian and Givetian. These were joined by progymnosperms, which rooted up to about a metre deep, during the ensuing Frasnian stage. True gymnosperms and zygopterid ferns also formed shallow rooting systems during the Famennian.

The rhizophores of the lycopods provide a slightly different approach to rooting. They were equivalent to stems, with organs equivalent to leaves performing the role of rootlets. A similar construction is observed in the extant lycopod Isoetes, and this appears to be evidence that roots evolved independently at least twice, in the lycophytes and other plants, a proposition supported by studies showing that roots are initiated and their growth promoted by different mechanisms in lycophytes and euphyllophytes.

Early rooted plants are little more advanced than their Silurian forebears, without a dedicated root system; however, the flat-lying axes can be clearly seen to have growths similar to the rhizoids of bryophytes today.

By the Middle to Late Devonian, most groups of plants had independently developed a rooting system of some nature. As roots became larger, they could support larger trees, and the soil was weathered to a greater depth. This deeper weathering had effects not only on the aforementioned drawdown of CO_{2}, but also opened up new habitats for colonisation by fungi and animals.

The narrowest roots of modern plants are a mere 40 μm in diameter, and could not physically transport water if they were any narrower. The earliest fossil roots recovered, by contrast, narrowed from 3 mm to under 700 μm in diameter; of course, taphonomy is the ultimate control of what thickness can be seen.

=== Tree form ===
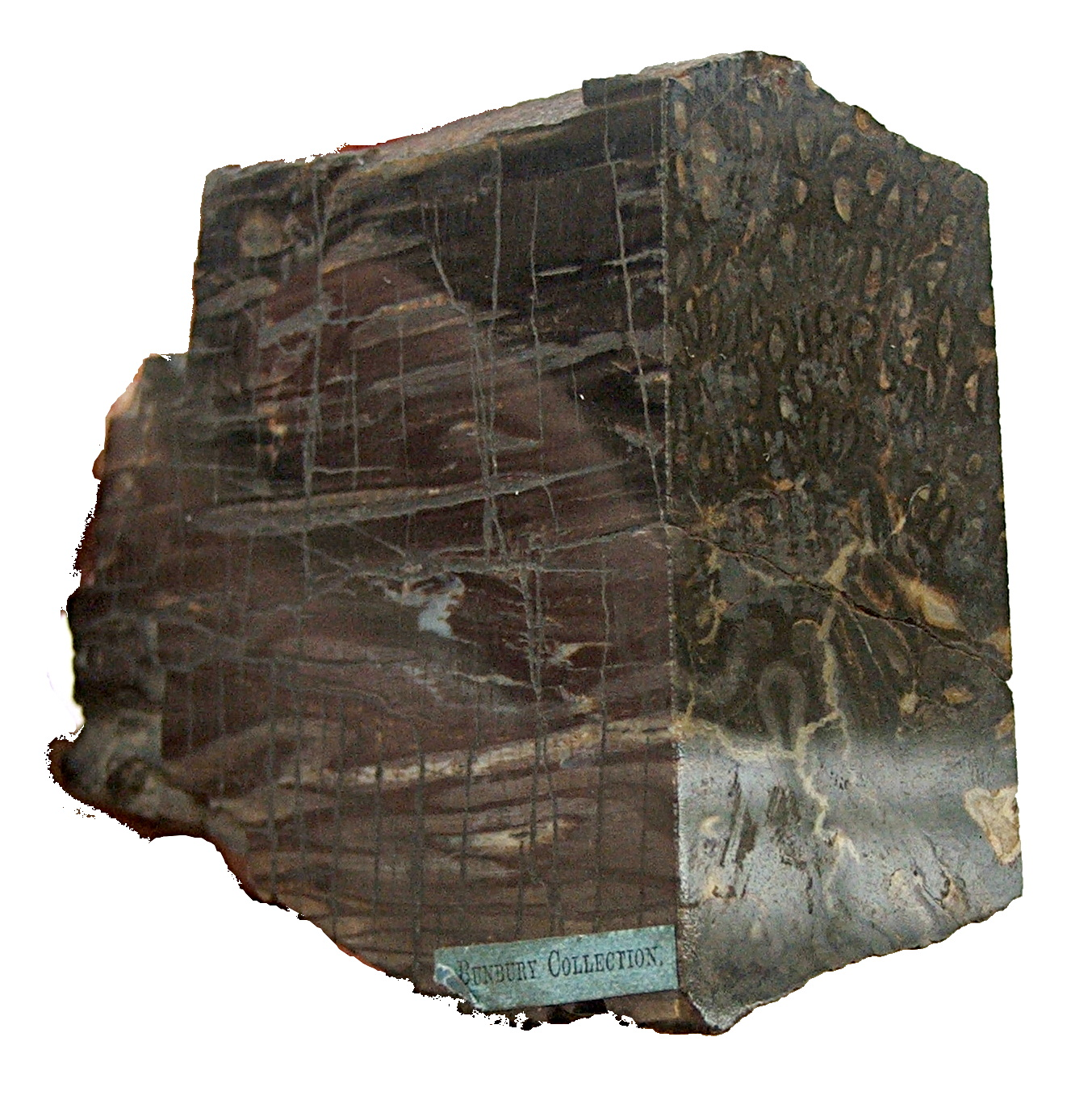
The trunk of early tree fern Psaronius, showing internal structure. The top of the plant would have been to the left of the image

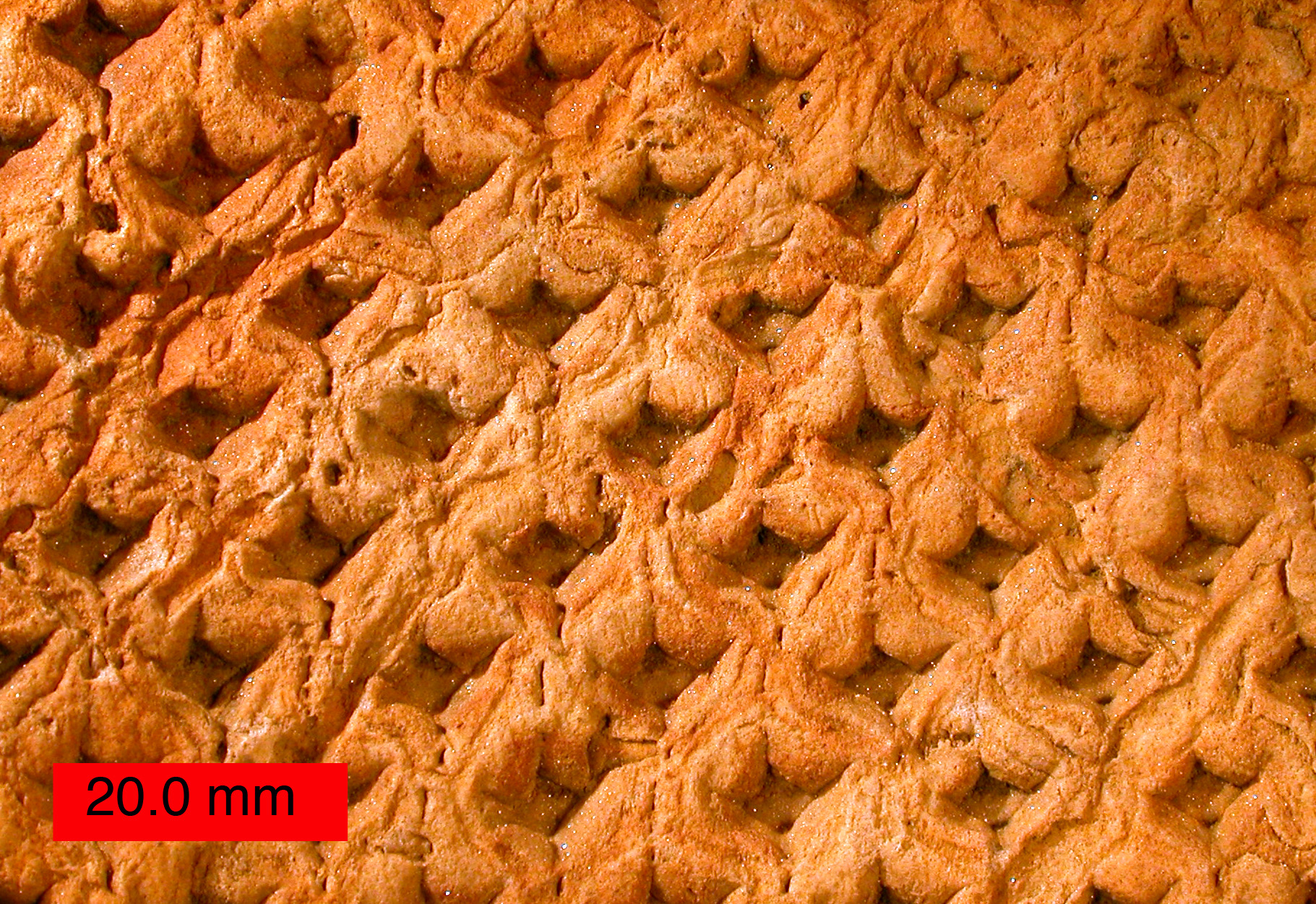
External mold of Lepidodendron trunk showing leaf scars from the Upper Carboniferous of Ohio

The early Devonian landscape was devoid of vegetation taller than waist height. Greater height provided a competitive advantage in the harvesting of sunlight for photosynthesis, overshadowing of competitors and in spore distribution, as spores (and later, seeds) could be blown for greater distances if they started higher. An effective vascular system was required in order to achieve greater heights. To attain arborescence, plants had to develop woody tissue that provided both support and water transport, and thus needed to evolve the capacity for secondary growth. The stele of plants undergoing secondary growth is surrounded by a vascular cambium, a ring of meristematic cells which produces more xylem on the inside and phloem on the outside. Since xylem cells comprise dead, lignified tissue, subsequent rings of xylem are added to those already present, forming wood. Fossils of plants from the early Devonian show that a simple form of wood first appeared at least 400 million years ago, at a time when all land plants were small and herbaceous. Because wood evolved long before shrubs and trees, it is likely that its original purpose was for water transport, and that it was only used for mechanical support later.

The first plants to develop secondary growth and a woody habit, were apparently the ferns, and as early as the Middle Devonian one species, Wattieza, had already reached heights of 8 m and a tree-like habit.

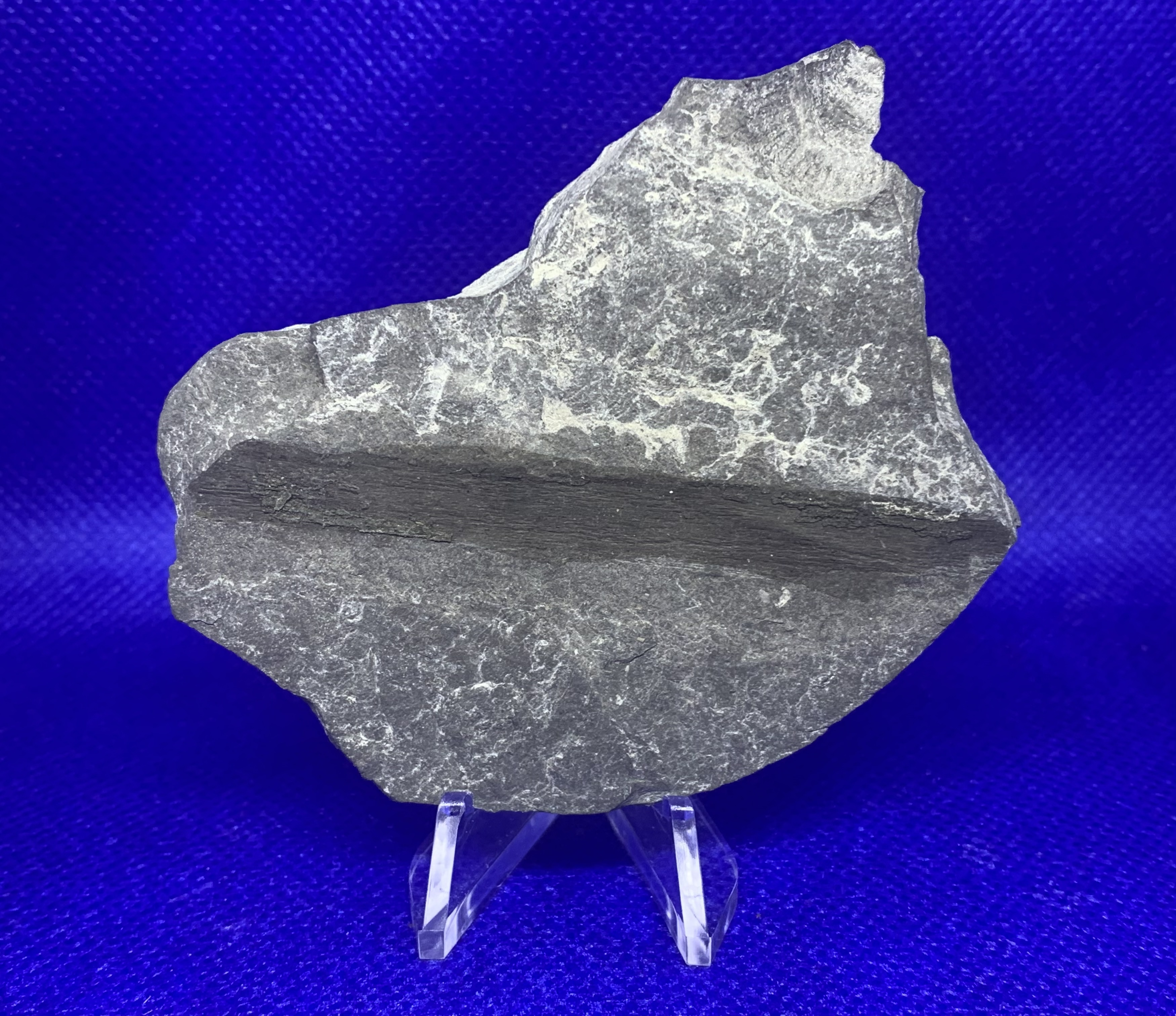
A piece of fossilized driftwood from the Middle Devonian (Givetian) of New York State.

Other clades did not take long to develop a tree-like stature. The Late Devonian Archaeopteris, a precursor to gymnosperms which evolved from the trimerophytes, reached 30 m in height. The progymnosperms were the first plants to develop true wood, grown from a bifacial cambium. The first appearance of one of them, Rellimia, was in the Middle Devonian. True wood is only thought to have evolved once, giving rise to the concept of a "lignophyte" clade.

Archaeopteris forests were soon supplemented by arborescent lycopods, in the form of Lepidodendrales, which exceeded 50m in height and 2m across at the base. These arborescent lycopods rose to dominate Late Devonian and Carboniferous forests that gave rise to coal deposits. Lepidodendrales differ from modern trees in exhibiting determinate growth: after building up a reserve of nutrients at a lower height, the plants would "bolt" as a single trunk to a genetically determined height, branch at that level, spread their spores and die. They consisted of "cheap" wood to allow their rapid growth, with at least half of their stems comprising a pith-filled cavity. Their wood was also generated by a unifacial vascular cambium – it did not produce new phloem, meaning that the trunks could not grow wider over time.

The horsetail Calamites appeared in the Carboniferous. Unlike the modern horsetail Equisetum, Calamites had a unifacial vascular cambium, allowing them to develop wood and grow to heights in excess of 10 m and to branch repeatedly.

While the form of early trees was similar to that of today's, the Spermatophytes or seed plants, the group that contain all modern trees, had yet to evolve. The dominant tree groups today are all seed plants, the gymnosperms, which include the coniferous trees, and the angiosperms, which contain all fruiting and flowering trees. No free-sporing trees like Archaeopteris exist in the extant flora. It was long thought that the angiosperms arose from within the gymnosperms, but recent molecular evidence suggests that their living representatives form two distinct groups. The molecular data has yet to be fully reconciled with morphological data, but it is becoming accepted that the morphological support for paraphyly is not especially strong. This would lead to the conclusion that both groups arose from within the pteridosperms, probably as early as the Permian.

The angiosperms and their ancestors played a very small role until they diversified during the Cretaceous. They started out as small, damp-loving organisms in the understorey, and have been diversifying ever since the Cretaceous, to become the dominant member of non-boreal forests today.

=== Seeds ===
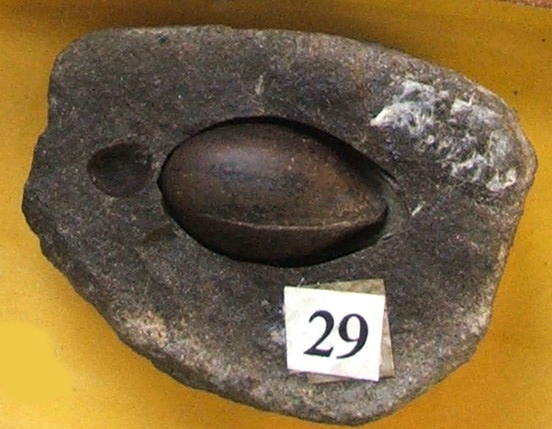
The fossil seed Trigonocarpus

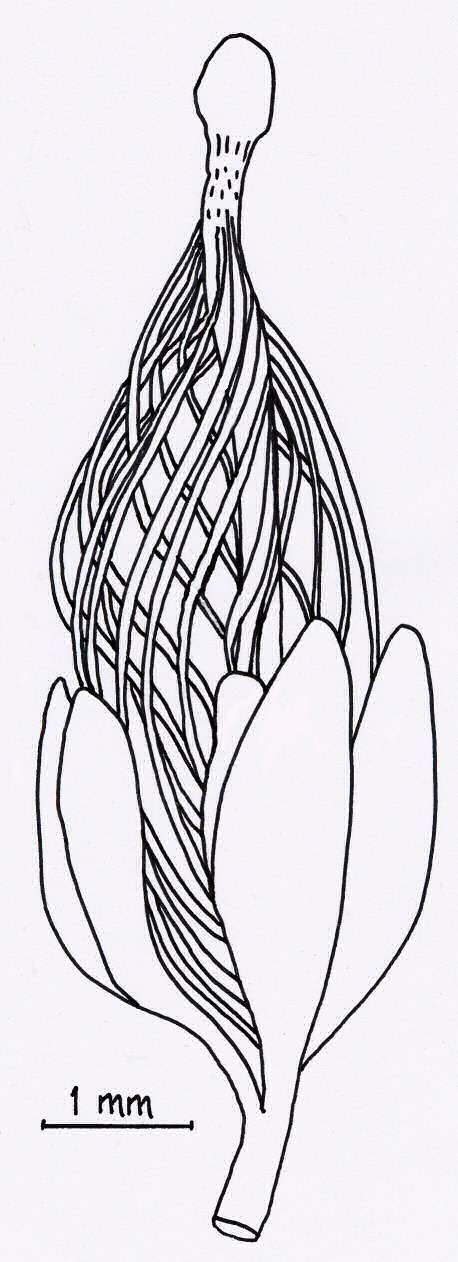
The transitional fossil Runcaria

Early land plants reproduced like ferns: spores germinated into small gametophytes, which produced eggs and/or sperm. These sperm would swim across moist soils to find the female organs (archegonia) on the same or another gametophyte, where they would fuse with an egg to produce an embryo, which would germinate into a sporophyte.

Heterosporic plants, as their name suggests, bear spores of two sizes – microspores and megaspores. These would germinate to form microgametophytes and megagametophytes, respectively. This system paved the way for ovules and seeds: taken to the extreme, the megasporangia could bear only a single megaspore tetrad, and to complete the transition to true ovules, three of the megaspores in the original tetrad could be aborted, leaving one megaspore per megasporangium.

The transition to ovules continued with this megaspore being "boxed in" to its sporangium while it germinated. Then, the megagametophyte was contained within a waterproof integument, which enclosed the seed. The pollen grain, which contained a microgametophyte germinated from a microspore, was employed for dispersal of the male gamete, only releasing its desiccation-prone flagellate sperm when it reached a receptive megagametophyte.

Lycopods and sphenopsids got a fair way down the path to the seed habit without ever crossing the threshold. Fossil lycopod megaspores reaching 1 cm in diameter, and surrounded by vegetative tissue, are known (Lepidocarpon, Achlamydocarpon); these even germinated into a megagametophyte in situ. However, they fell short of being ovules, since the nucellus, an inner spore-covering layer, does not completely enclose the spore. A very small slit (micropyle) remains, meaning that the megasporangium is still exposed to the atmosphere. This has two consequences – firstly, it means it is not fully resistant to desiccation, and secondly, sperm do not have to "burrow" to access the archegonia of the megaspore.

A Middle Devonian precursor to seed plants from Belgium has been identified predating the earliest seed plants by about 20 million years. Runcaria, small and radially symmetrical, is an integumented megasporangium surrounded by a cupule. The megasporangium bears an unopened distal extension protruding above the multilobed integument. It is suspected that the extension was involved in anemophilous pollination. Runcaria sheds new light on the sequence of character acquisition leading to the seed. Runcaria has all of the qualities of seed plants except for a solid seed coat and a system to guide the pollen to the ovule.

The first spermatophytes (literally: "seed plants") – that is, the first plants to bear true seeds – are called pteridosperms: literally, "seed ferns", so called because their foliage consisted of fern-like fronds, although they were not closely related to ferns. The oldest fossil evidence of seed plants is of Late Devonian age, and they appear to have evolved out of an earlier group known as the progymnosperms. These early seed plants ranged from trees to small, rambling shrubs; like most early progymnosperms, they were woody plants with fern-like foliage. They all bore ovules, but no cones, fruit or similar. While it is difficult to track the early evolution of seeds, the lineage of the seed ferns may be traced from the simple trimerophytes through homosporous Aneurophytes. The seed plants underwent their first major evolutionary radiation in the Famennian era.

This seed model is shared by basically all gymnosperms (literally: "naked seeds"), most of which encase their seeds in a woody cone or fleshy aril (the yew, for example), but none of which fully enclose their seeds. The angiosperms ("vessel seeds") are the only group to fully enclose the seed, in a carpel.

Fully enclosed seeds opened up a new pathway for plants to follow: that of seed dormancy. The embryo, completely isolated from the external atmosphere and hence protected from desiccation, could survive some years of drought before germinating. Gymnosperm seeds from the Late Carboniferous have been found to contain embryos, suggesting a lengthy gap between fertilisation and germination. This period is associated with the entry into a greenhouse earth period, with an associated increase in aridity. This suggests that dormancy arose as a response to drier climatic conditions, where it became advantageous to wait for a moist period before germinating. This evolutionary breakthrough appears to have opened a floodgate: previously inhospitable areas, such as dry mountain slopes, could now be tolerated, and were soon covered by trees.

Seeds offered further advantages to their bearers: they increased the success rate of fertilised gametophytes, and because a nutrient store could be "packaged" in with the embryo, the seeds could germinate rapidly in inhospitable environments, reaching a size where it could fend for itself more quickly. For example, without an endosperm, seedlings growing in arid environments would not have the reserves to grow roots deep enough to reach the water table before they expired from dehydration. Likewise, seeds germinating in a gloomy understory require an additional reserve of energy to quickly grow high enough to capture sufficient light for self-sustenance. A combination of these advantages gave seed plants the ecological edge over the previously dominant genus Archaeopteris, thus increasing the biodiversity of early forests.

Despite these advantages, it is common for fertilized ovules to fail to mature as seeds. Also during seed dormancy (often associated with unpredictable and stressful conditions) DNA damage accumulates. Thus DNA damage appears to be a basic problem for survival of seed plants, just as DNA damage is a major problem for life in general.

=== Flowers ===
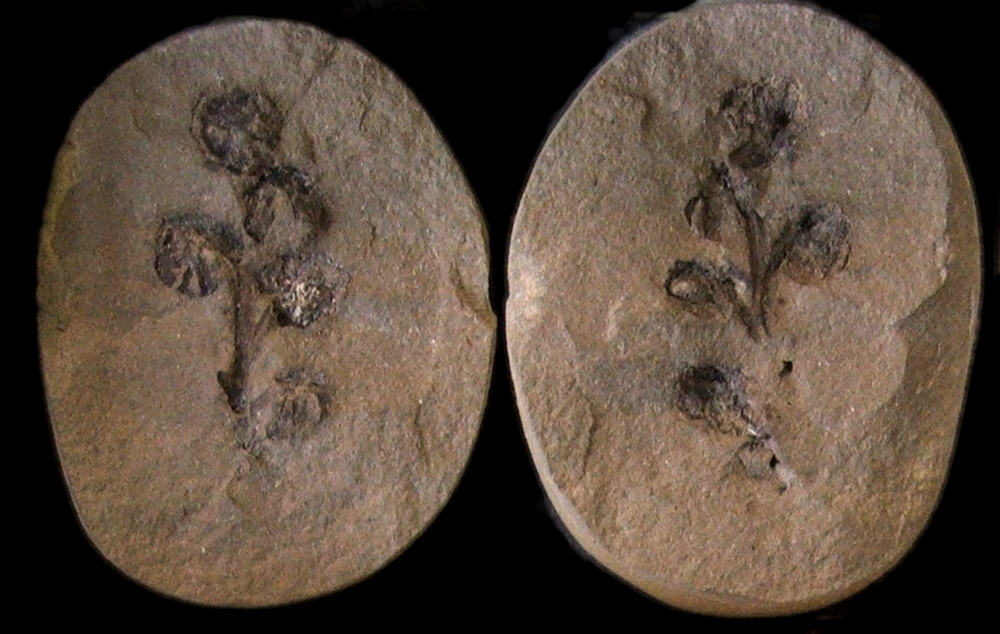
The pollen bearing organs of the early "flower" Crossotheca

Flowers are modified leaves possessed only by the angiosperms, which are relatively late to appear in the fossil record. The group originated and diversified during the Early Cretaceous and became ecologically significant thereafter. Flower-like structures first appear in the fossil records some ~130 mya, in the Cretaceous. However, in 2018, scientists reported the finding of a fossil flower from about 180 million years ago, 50 million years earlier than previously thought. The interpretation has been however highly disputed.

Colorful and/or pungent structures surround the cones of plants such as cycads and Gnetales, making a strict definition of the term "flower" elusive.

The main function of a flower is reproduction, which, before the evolution of the flower and angiosperms, was the job of microsporophylls and megasporophylls. A flower can be considered a powerful evolutionary innovation, because its presence allowed the plant world to access new means and mechanisms for reproduction.

The evolution of syncarps. a: sporangia borne at tips of leaf b: Leaf curls up to protect sporangia c: leaf curls to form enclosed roll d: grouping of three rolls into a syncarp

The flowering plants have long been assumed to have evolved from within the gymnosperms; according to the traditional morphological view, they are closely allied to the Gnetales. However, as noted above, recent molecular evidence is at odds with this hypothesis, and further suggests that Gnetales are more closely related to some gymnosperm groups than angiosperms, and that extant gymnosperms form a distinct clade to the angiosperms, the two clades diverging some 300 million years ago.

The relationship of stem groups to the angiosperms is important in determining the evolution of flowers. Stem groups provide an insight into the state of earlier "forks" on the path to the current state. Convergence increases the risk of misidentifying stem groups. Since the protection of the megagametophyte is evolutionarily desirable, probably many separate groups evolved protective encasements independently. In flowers, this protection takes the form of a carpel, evolved from a leaf and recruited into a protective role, shielding the ovules. These ovules are further protected by a double-walled integument.

Penetration of these protective layers needs something more than a free-floating microgametophyte. Angiosperms have pollen grains comprising just three cells. One cell is responsible for drilling down through the integuments, and creating a conduit for the two sperm cells to flow down. The megagametophyte has just seven cells; of these, one fuses with a sperm cell, forming the nucleus of the egg itself, and another joins with the other sperm, and dedicates itself to forming a nutrient-rich endosperm. The other cells take auxiliary roles. This process of "double fertilisation" is unique and common to all angiosperms.

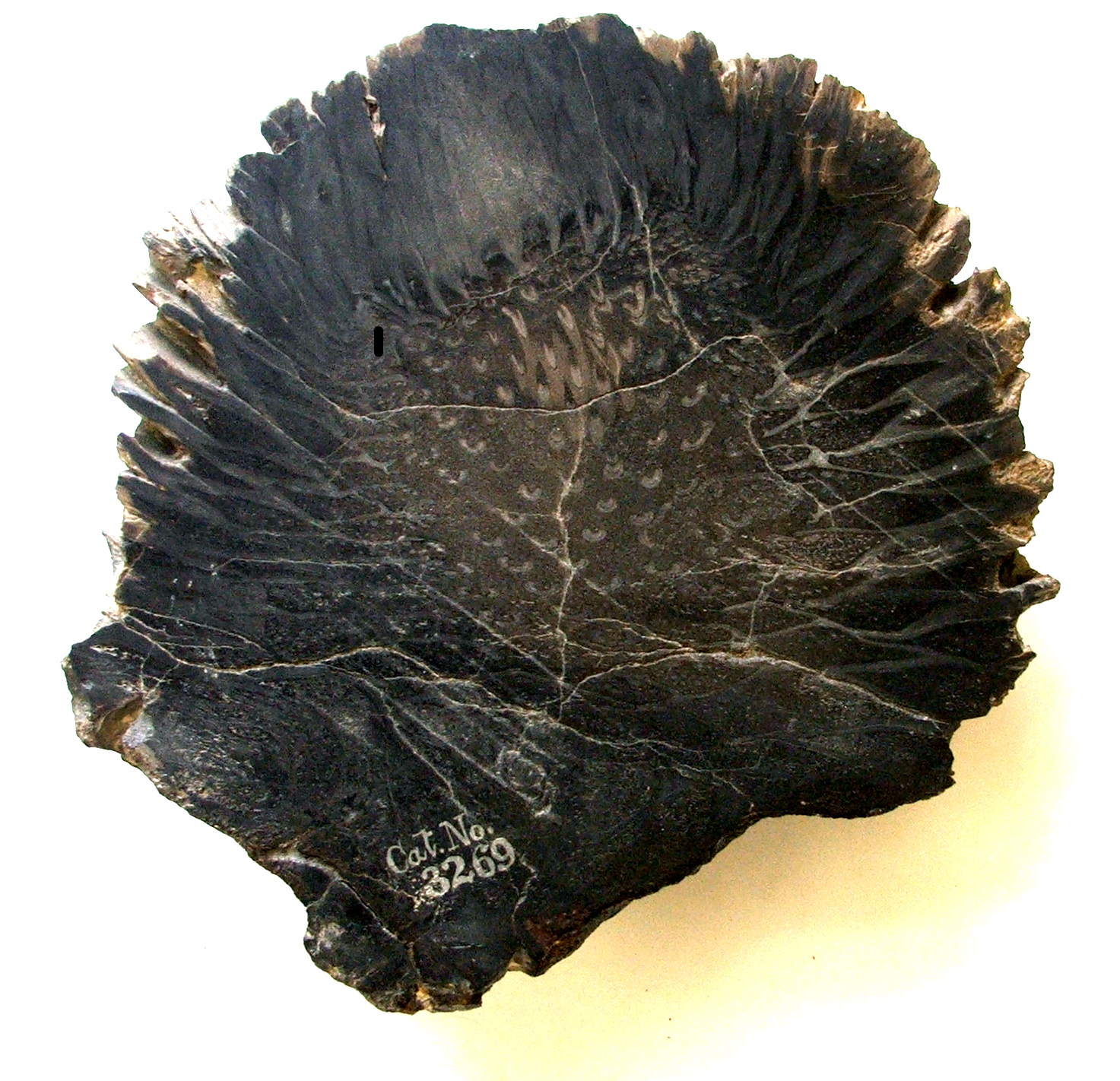
The inflorescences of the Bennettitales are strikingly similar to flowers, but evolved independently.

In the fossil record, there are three intriguing groups which bore flower-like structures. The first is the Permian pteridosperm Glossopteris, which already bore recurved leaves resembling carpels. The Mesozoic Caytonia is more flower-like still, with enclosed ovules – but only a single integument. Further, details of their pollen and stamens set them apart from true flowering plants.

The Bennettitales bore remarkably flower-like organs, protected by whorls of bracts which may have played a similar role to the petals and sepals of true flowers; however, these flower-like structures evolved independently, as the Bennettitales are more closely related to cycads and ginkgos than to the angiosperms.

However, no true flowers are found in any groups save those extant today. Most morphological and molecular analyses place Amborella, the nymphaeales and Austrobaileyaceae in a basal clade called "ANA". This clade appear to have diverged in the early Cretaceous, around 130 million years ago – around the same time as the earliest fossil angiosperm, and just after the first angiosperm-like pollen, 136 million years ago. The magnoliids diverged soon after, and a rapid radiation had produced eudicots and monocots by 125 million years ago. By the end of the Cretaceous 66 million years ago, over 50% of today's angiosperm orders had evolved, and the clade accounted for 70% of global species. It was around this time that flowering trees became dominant over conifers.

The features of the basal "ANA" groups suggest that angiosperms originated in dark, damp, frequently disturbed areas. It appears that the angiosperms remained constrained to such habitats throughout the Cretaceous – occupying the niche of small herbs early in the successional series. This may have restricted their initial significance, but given them the flexibility that accounted for the rapidity of their later diversifications in other habitats.

Traditional view (clade)

- - Cycads
  - - Ginkgo
    - - Conifers
      - - Anthophytes
          - Angiosperms
          - Bennettitales
          - Gnetales

Modern view

- - Angiosperms
  - - Gymnosperms
      - - Conifers
        - Gnetales
      - - Ginkgo
        - - Bennettitales
          - Cycads

Phylogeny of anthophytes and gymnosperms based on Crepet et al. (2000)

Some propose that the Angiosperms arose from an unknown seed fern, Pteridophyte, and view cycads as living seed ferns with both seed-bearing and sterile leaves (Cycas revoluta)

In August 2017, scientists presented a detailed description and 3D reconstruction of possibly the first flower that lived about 140 million years ago.

==== Origins of the flower ====
The family Amborellaceae is regarded as being the sister clade to all other living flowering plants. A draft genome of Amborella trichopoda was published in December 2013. By comparing its genome with those of all other living flowering plants, it will be possible to work out the most likely characteristics of the ancestor of A. trichopoda and all other flowering plants, i.e. the ancestral flowering plant.

It seems that on the level of the organ, the leaf may be the ancestor of the flower, or at least some floral organs. When some crucial genes involved in flower development are mutated, clusters of leaf-like structures arise in place of flowers. Thus, sometime in history, the developmental program leading to formation of a leaf must have been altered to generate a flower. There probably also exists an overall robust framework within which the floral diversity has been generated. An example of that is a gene called LEAFY (LFY), which is involved in flower development in Arabidopsis thaliana. The homologs of this gene are found in angiosperms as diverse as tomato, snapdragon, pea, maize and even gymnosperms. Expression of Arabidopsis thaliana LFY in distant plants like poplar and citrus also results in flower-production in these plants. The LFY gene regulates the expression of some genes belonging to the MADS-box family. These genes, in turn, act as direct controllers of flower development.

=== Adaptive function of flowers ===
Flowers likely emerged during plant evolution as an adaptation to facilitate cross-fertilization (outcrossing), a process that leads to the masking of recessive deleterious mutations in progeny genomes. This masking effect of expression of deleterious mutations is referred to as genetic complementation. This beneficial masking effect of cross-fertilization is also considered to be the basis of hybrid vigor or heterosis in progeny. Once flowers have become established in a lineage based on their adaptive function of promoting cross-fertilization, subsequent switching to inbreeding ordinarily then becomes disadvantageous, mainly because it permits expression of the previously masked deleterious recessive mutations, i.e. inbreeding depression. In addition, meiosis, the process by which seed progeny are produced in flowering plants, provides a direct mechanism for repairing DNA through genetic recombination. Thus, in flowering plants, the two fundamental processes of sexual reproduction are cross-fertilization (outcrossing) and meiosis and these two processes appear to be maintained respectively by the advantages of genetic complementation and recombinational repair of DNA.

==== Evolution of the MADS-box family ====
The members of the MADS-box family of transcription factors play a very important and evolutionarily conserved role in flower development. According to the ABC Model of flower development, three zones — A, B and C — are generated within the developing flower primordium, by the action of some transcription factors, that are members of the MADS-box family. Among these, the functions of the B and C domain genes have been evolutionarily more conserved than the A domain gene. Many of these genes have arisen through gene duplications of ancestral members of this family. Quite a few of them show redundant functions.

The evolution of the MADS-box family has been extensively studied. These genes are present even in pteridophytes, but the spread and diversity is many times higher in angiosperms. There appears to be quite a bit of pattern into how this family has evolved. Consider the evolution of the C-region gene AGAMOUS (AG). It is expressed in today's flowers in the stamens, and the carpel, which are reproductive organs. Its ancestor in gymnosperms also has the same expression pattern. Here, it is expressed in the strobili, an organ that produces pollen or ovules. Similarly, the B-genes' (AP3 and PI) ancestors are expressed only in the male organs in gymnosperms. Their descendants in the modern angiosperms also are expressed only in the stamens, the male reproductive organ. Thus, the same, then-existing components were used by the plants in a novel manner to generate the first flower. This is a recurring pattern in evolution.

=== Factors influencing floral diversity ===
There is enormous variation in floral structure in plants, typically due to changes in the MADS-box genes and their expression pattern. For example, grasses possess unique floral structures. The carpels and stamens are surrounded by scale-like lodicules and two bracts, the lemma and the palea, but genetic evidence and morphology suggest that lodicules are homologous to eudicot petals. The palea and lemma may be homologous to sepals in other groups, or may be unique grass structures. Another example is that of Linaria vulgaris, which has two kinds of flower symmetries-radial and bilateral. These symmetries are due to epigenetic changes in just one gene called CYCLOIDEA.

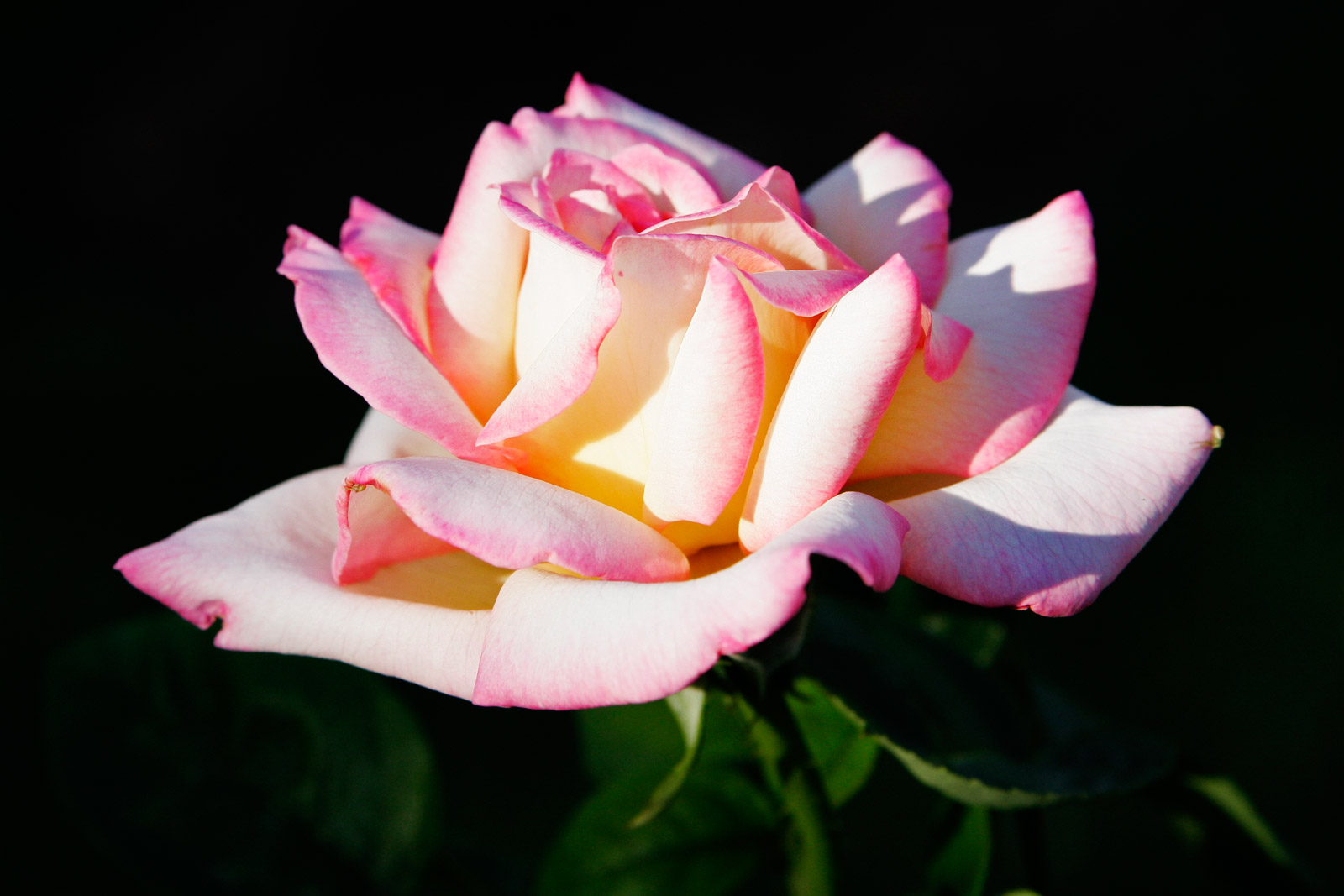
Large number of petals in roses is the result of human selection

Arabidopsis thaliana has a gene called AGAMOUS that plays an important role in defining how many petals and sepals and other organs are generated. Mutations in this gene give rise to the floral meristem obtaining an indeterminate fate, and proliferation of floral organs in double-flowered forms of roses, carnations and morning glory. These phenotypes have been selected by horticulturists for their increased number of petals. Several studies on diverse plants like petunia, tomato, Impatiens, maize, etc. have suggested that the enormous diversity of flowers is a result of small changes in genes controlling their development.

The Floral Genome Project confirmed that the ABC Model of flower development is not conserved across all angiosperms. Sometimes expression domains change, as in the case of many monocots, and also in some basal angiosperms like Amborella. Different models of flower development like the Fading boundaries model, or the Overlapping-boundaries model which propose non-rigid domains of expression, may explain these architectures. There is a possibility that from the basal to the modern angiosperms, the domains of floral architecture have become more and more fixed through evolution.

==== Flowering time ====
Another floral feature that has been a subject of natural selection is flowering time. Some plants flower early in their life cycle, others require a period of vernalization before flowering. This outcome is based on factors like temperature, light intensity, presence of pollinators and other environmental signals: genes like CONSTANS (CO), Flowering Locus C (FLC) and FRIGIDA regulate integration of environmental signals into the pathway for flower development. Variations in these loci have been associated with flowering time variations between plants. For example, Arabidopsis thaliana ecotypes that grow in the cold, temperate regions require prolonged vernalization before they flower, while the tropical varieties, and the most common lab strains, don't. This variation is due to mutations in the FLC and FRIGIDA genes, rendering them non-functional.

Many of the genes involved in this process are conserved across all the plants studied. Sometimes though, despite genetic conservation, the mechanism of action turns out to be different. For example, rice is a short-day plant, while Arabidopsis thaliana is a long-day plant. Both plants have the proteins CO and FLOWERING LOCUS T (FT), but, in Arabidopsis thaliana, CO enhances FT production, while in rice, the CO homolog represses FT production, resulting in completely opposite downstream effects.

==== Theories of flower evolution ====
The Anthophyte theory was based on the observation that a gymnospermic group Gnetales has a flower-like ovule. It has partially developed vessels as found in the angiosperms, and the megasporangium is covered by three envelopes, like the ovary structure of angiosperm flowers. However, many other lines of evidence show that Gnetales is not related to angiosperms.

The Mostly Male theory has a more genetic basis. Proponents of this theory point out that the gymnosperms have two very similar copies of the gene LFY, while angiosperms just have one. Molecular clock analysis has shown that the other LFY paralog was lost in angiosperms around the same time as flower fossils become abundant, suggesting that this event might have led to floral evolution. According to this theory, loss of one of the LFY paralog led to flowers that were more male, with the ovules being expressed ectopically. These ovules initially performed the function of attracting pollinators, but sometime later, may have been integrated into the core flower.

== Evolution of photosynthetic pathways ==
The C_{4} carbon concentrating mechanism

The C_{4} metabolic pathway is a valuable recent evolutionary innovation in plants, involving a complex set of adaptive changes to physiology and gene expression patterns.

Photosynthesis is a complex chemical pathway facilitated by a range of enzymes and co-enzymes. The enzyme RuBisCO is responsible for "fixing" CO_{2} – that is, it attaches it to a carbon-based molecule to form a sugar, which can be used by the plant, releasing an oxygen molecule. However, the enzyme is notoriously inefficient, and, as ambient temperature rises, will increasingly fix oxygen instead of CO_{2} in a process called photorespiration. This is energetically costly as the plant has to use energy to turn the products of photorespiration back into a form that can react with CO_{2}.

=== Concentrating carbon ===
Broadly, the two main ways to concentrate carbon dioxide in plants are 1) biochemical CO_{2} concentrating mechanisms (CCM) and 2) biophysical CO_{2} concentrating mechanisms. Biochemical CCMs such as C_{4} and CAM photosynthesis concentrate CO_{2} by using an enzyme, phosphoenolpyruvate carboxylase, to bind inorganic carbon to an intermediate four carbon sugar, which can then be converted back to RuBP and CO_{2} for subsequent fixation by Rubisco. Biophysical CCMs like carboxysomes and pyrenoids concentrate CO_{2} in a particular locus through the coordination of carbonic anhydrases and anion channels.

C_{4} plants evolved carbon concentrating mechanisms that work by increasing the concentration of CO_{2} around RuBisCO, and excluding oxygen, thereby increasing the efficiency of photosynthesis by decreasing photorespiration. The process of concentrating CO_{2} around RuBisCO requires more energy than allowing gases to diffuse, but under certain conditions – i.e. warm temperatures (>25 °C), low CO_{2} concentrations, or high oxygen concentrations – pays off in terms of the decreased loss of sugars through photorespiration.

One type of C_{4} metabolism employs a so-called Kranz anatomy. This transports CO_{2} through an outer mesophyll layer, via a range of organic molecules, to the central bundle sheath cells, where the CO_{2} is released. In this way, CO_{2} is concentrated near the site of RuBisCO operation. Because RuBisCO is operating in an environment with much more CO_{2} than it otherwise would be, it performs more efficiently.

A second mechanism, CAM photosynthesis, temporally separates photosynthesis from the action of RuBisCO. RuBisCO only operates during the day, when stomata are sealed and CO_{2} is provided by the breakdown of the chemical malate. More CO_{2} is then harvested from the atmosphere when stomata open, during the cool, moist nights, reducing water loss.

The third mechanism present in plants, pyrenoid-based CCMs, is found only in the hornwort lineage. In this mechanism, RuBisCO is concentrated in the pyrenoid, a membraneless compartment, by importing inorganic carbon in the form of bicarbonate. This import is thought to be dependent on the coordination of carbonic anhydrases and anion channels, and takes advantage of the native pH differences between the cytosol, chloroplast stroma, and thylakoid lumen.

=== Evolutionary record ===
These two pathways, with the same effect on RuBisCO, evolved a number of times independently – indeed, C_{4} alone arose 62 times in 18 different plant families. A number of "pre-adaptations" seem to have paved the way for C_{4}, leading to its clustering in certain clades: it has most frequently been innovated in plants that already had features such as extensive vascular bundle sheath tissue. Many potential evolutionary pathways resulting in the C_{4} phenotype are possible and have been characterised using Bayesian inference, confirming that non-photosynthetic adaptations often provide evolutionary stepping stones for the further evolution of C_{4}.

The C_{4} construction is used by a subset of grasses, while CAM is employed by many succulents and cacti. The C_{4} trait appears to have emerged during the Oligocene, around 25 to 32 million years ago; however, they did not become ecologically significant until the Miocene, 6 to 7 million years ago. Remarkably, some charcoalified fossils preserve tissue organised into the Kranz anatomy, with intact bundle sheath cells, allowing the presence C_{4} metabolism to be identified. Isotopic markers are used to deduce their distribution and significance. C_{3} plants preferentially use the lighter of two isotopes of carbon in the atmosphere, ^{12}C, which is more readily involved in the chemical pathways involved in its fixation. Because C_{4} metabolism involves a further chemical step, this effect is accentuated. Plant material can be analysed to deduce the ratio of the heavier ^{13}C to ^{12}C. This ratio is denoted δ^{13}C. C_{3} plants are on average around 14‰ (parts per thousand) lighter than the atmospheric ratio, while C_{4} plants are about 28‰ lighter. The δ^{13}C of CAM plants depends on the percentage of carbon fixed at night relative to what is fixed in the day, being closer to C_{3} plants if they fix most carbon in the day and closer to C_{4} plants if they fix all their carbon at night.

Original fossil material in sufficient quantity to analyse the grass itself is scarce, but horses provide a good proxy. They were globally widespread in the period of interest, and browsed almost exclusively on grasses. There's an old phrase in isotope paleontology, "you are what you eat (plus a little bit)" – this refers to the fact that organisms reflect the isotopic composition of whatever they eat, plus a small adjustment factor. There is a good record of horse teeth throughout the globe, and their δ^{13}C record shows a sharp negative inflection around 6 to 7 million years ago, during the Messinian that is interpreted as resulting from the rise of C_{4} plants on a global scale.

=== Advantage of C_{4} ===
While C_{4} enhances the efficiency of RuBisCO, the concentration of carbon is highly energy intensive. This means that C_{4} plants only have an advantage over C_{3} organisms in certain conditions: namely, high temperatures and low rainfall. C_{4} plants also need high levels of sunlight to thrive. Models suggest that, without wildfires removing shade-casting trees and shrubs, there would be no space for C_{4} plants. But, wildfires have occurred for 400 million years. The Carboniferous (~300 million years ago) had notoriously high oxygen levels – almost enough to allow spontaneous combustion – and very low CO_{2}, but no C_{4} isotopic signature has been found. There also does not seem to be a sudden trigger for the Miocene rise.

During the Miocene, the atmosphere and climate were relatively stable. If anything, CO_{2} increased gradually from 14 to 9 million years ago before settling down to concentrations similar to the Holocene. This suggests that it did not have a key role in invoking C_{4} evolution. Grasses themselves (the group which would give rise to the most occurrences of C_{4}) had probably been around for 60 million years or more, so had had plenty of time to evolve C_{4}, which, in any case, is present in a diverse range of groups and thus evolved independently. There is a strong signal of climate change in South Asia; increasing aridity – hence increasing fire frequency and intensity – may have led to an increase in the importance of grasslands. However, this is difficult to reconcile with the North American record. It is possible that the signal is entirely biological, forced by the fire driven acceleration of grass evolution – which, both by increasing weathering and incorporating more carbon into sediments, reduced atmospheric CO_{2} levels. Finally, there is evidence that the onset of C_{4} from 9 to 7 million years ago is a biased signal, which only holds true for North America, from where most samples originate; emerging evidence suggests that grasslands evolved to a dominant state at least 15Ma earlier in South America.

== Evolution of transcriptional regulation ==
Transcription factors and transcriptional regulatory networks play key roles in plant development and stress responses, as well as their evolution. During plant landing, many novel transcription factor families emerged and are preferentially wired into the networks of multicellular development, reproduction, and organ development, contributing to more complex morphogenesis of land plants.

== Evolution of secondary metabolism ==
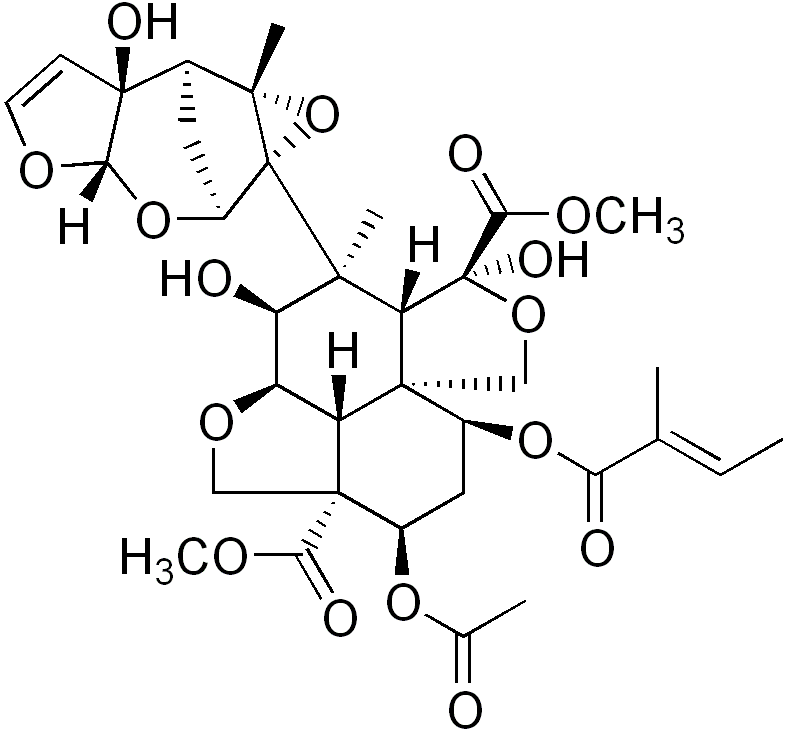
Structure of azadirachtin, a terpenoid produced by the neem plant, which helps ward off microbes and insects. Many secondary metabolites have complex structures

Secondary metabolites are essentially low molecular weight compounds, sometimes having complex structures, that are not essential for the normal processes of growth, development, or reproduction. They function in processes as diverse as immunity, anti-herbivory, pollinator attraction, communication between plants, maintaining symbiotic associations with soil flora, or enhancing the rate of fertilization, and hence are significant from the evo-devo perspective. Secondary metabolites are structurally and functionally diverse, and it is estimated that hundreds of thousands of enzymes might be involved in the process of producing them, with about 15–25% of the genome coding for these enzymes, and every species having its unique arsenal of secondary metabolites. Many of these metabolites, such as salicylic acid are of medical significance to humans.

The purpose of producing so many secondary metabolites, with a significant proportion of the metabolome devoted to this activity is unclear. It is postulated that most of these chemicals help in generating immunity and, in consequence, the diversity of these metabolites is a result of a constant arms race between plants and their parasites. Some evidence supports this case. A central question involves the reproductive cost to maintaining such a large inventory of genes devoted to producing secondary metabolites. Various models have been suggested that probe into this aspect of the question, but a consensus on the extent of the cost has yet to be established; as it is still difficult to predict whether a plant with more secondary metabolites increases its survival or reproductive success compared to other plants in its vicinity.

Secondary metabolite production seems to have arisen quite early during evolution. In plants, they seem to have spread out using mechanisms including gene duplications or the evolution of novel genes. Furthermore, research has shown that diversity in some of these compounds may be positively selected for. Although the role of novel gene evolution in the evolution of secondary metabolism is clear, there are several examples where new metabolites have been formed by small changes in the reaction. For example, cyanogen glycosides have been proposed to have evolved multiple times in different plant lineages. There are several such instances of convergent evolution. For example, enzymes for synthesis of limonene – a terpene – are more similar between angiosperms and gymnosperms than to their own terpene synthesis enzymes. This suggests independent evolution of the limonene biosynthetic pathway in these two lineages.

== Evolution of plant-microbe interactions ==
The origin of microbes on Earth, tracing back to the beginning of life more than 3.5 billion years ago, indicates that microbe-microbe interactions have continuously evolved and diversified over time, long before plants started to colonize land 450 million years ago. Therefore, it is likely that both intra- and inter-kingdom intermicrobial interactions represent strong drivers of the establishment of plant-associated microbial consortia at the soil-root interface. Nonetheless, it remains unclear to what extent these interactions in the rhizosphere/phyllosphere and in endophytic plant compartments (i.e., within the host) shape microbial assemblages in nature and whether microbial adaptation to plant habitats drive habitat-specific microbe-microbe interaction strategies that impact plant fitness. Furthermore, the contribution of competitive and cooperative microbe-microbe interactions to the overall community structure remains difficult to evaluate in nature due to the strong environmental noise.

== See also ==
- Evolution of herbivory
- Evolutionary history of life
- Paleobotany
- Plant evolutionary developmental biology
- Timeline of plant evolution
