= Timeline of plant evolution =

Chronological outline of major events in the development of plants

This article attempts to place key plant innovations in a geological context. It concerns itself only with novel adaptations and events that had a major ecological significance, not those that are of solely anthropological interest. The timeline displays a graphical representation of the adaptations; the text attempts to explain the nature and robustness of the evidence.

Plant evolution is an aspect of the study of biological evolution, predominantly involving evolution of plants suited to live on land, greening of various land masses by the filling of their niches with land plants, and diversification of groups of land plants.

== Earliest plants ==
In the strictest sense, the name plant refers to those land plants that form the clade Embryophyta, comprising the bryophytes and vascular plants. However, the clade Viridiplantae or green plants includes some other groups of photosynthetic eukaryotes, including green algae. It is widely believed that land plants evolved from a group of charophytes, most likely simple single-celled terrestrial algae similar to extant Klebsormidiophyceae.

Chloroplasts in plants evolved from an endosymbiotic relationship between a cyanobacterium, a photosynthesising prokaryote and a non-photosynthetic eukaryotic organism, producing a lineage of photosynthesizing eukaryotic organisms in marine and freshwater environments. These earliest photosynthesizing single-celled autotrophs evolved into multicellular organisms such as the Charophyta, a group of freshwater green algae.

Fossil evidence of plants begins around 3000 Ma with indirect evidence of oxygen-producing photosynthesis in the geological record, in the form of chemical and isotopic signatures in rocks and fossil evidence of colonies of cyanobacteria, photosynthesizing prokaryotic organisms. Cyanobacteria use water as a reducing agent, producing atmospheric oxygen as a byproduct, and they thereby profoundly changed the early reducing atmosphere of the earth to one in which modern aerobic organisms eventually evolved. This oxygen liberated by cyanobacteria then oxidized dissolved iron in the oceans, the iron precipitated out of the sea water, and fell to the ocean floor to form sedimentary layers of oxidized iron called Banded Iron Formations (BIFs). These BIFs are part of the geological record of evidence for the evolutionary history of plants by identifying when photosynthesis originated. This also provides deep time constraints upon when enough oxygen could have been available in the atmosphere to produce the ultraviolet blocking stratospheric ozone layer. The oxygen concentration in the ancient atmosphere subsequently rose, acting as a poison for anaerobic organisms, and resulting in a highly oxidizing atmosphere, and opening up niches on land for occupation by aerobic organisms.

Fossil evidence for cyanobacteria also comes from the presence of stromatolites in the fossil record deep into the Precambrian. Stromatolites are layered structures formed by the trapping, binding, and cementation of sedimentary grains by microbial biofilms, such as those produced by cyanobacteria. The direct evidence for cyanobacteria is less certain than the evidence for their presence as primary producers of atmospheric oxygen. Modern stromatolites containing cyanobacteria can be found on the west coast of Australia and other areas in saline lagoons and in freshwater.

Key innovations in early plant evolution
← / Spore tetrads; ← / Rhynie chert; ← / Sporangia; ← / Stems; ← / Roots; ← / Seeds; ← / Wood; ← / Leaves; ← / Runcaria heinzelinii - First seed plant; ← / Carnivory
Axis scale: millions of years ago.

== Paleozoic flora ==
=== Cambrian flora ===
Early plants were small, unicellular or filamentous, with simple branching. The identification of plant fossils in Cambrian strata is an uncertain area in the evolutionary history of plants because of the small and soft-bodied nature of these plants. It is also difficult in a fossil of this age to distinguish among various similar appearing groups with simple branching patterns, and not all of these groups are plants. One exception to the uncertainty of fossils from this age is the group of calcareous green algae, Dasycladales found in the fossil record since the middle Cambrian. These algae do not belong to the lineage that is ancestral to the land plants. Other major groups of green algae had been established by this time, but there were no land plants with vascular tissues until the mid-Silurian.

=== Ordovician flora ===
The evidence of plant evolution changes dramatically in the Ordovician with the first extensive appearance of embryophyte spores in the fossil record. The earliest terrestrial plants lived during the Middle Ordovician around 470 million years ago, based on their fossils found in the form of monads and spores, with resistant polymers in their outer walls, from Turkey, Saudi Arabia and Argentina. Individual trilete spores resembling those of modern cryptogamic plants and vascular plants first appeared in the fossil record from the Late Ordovician. These plants probably resembled liverworts, and did not have any conducting tissues. They were able to reproduce with spores, important dispersal units that have hard protective outer coatings which not only allowed their preservation in the fossil record, but also protected them from the UV light, desiccating environment and possible microorganism attack.

=== Silurian flora ===
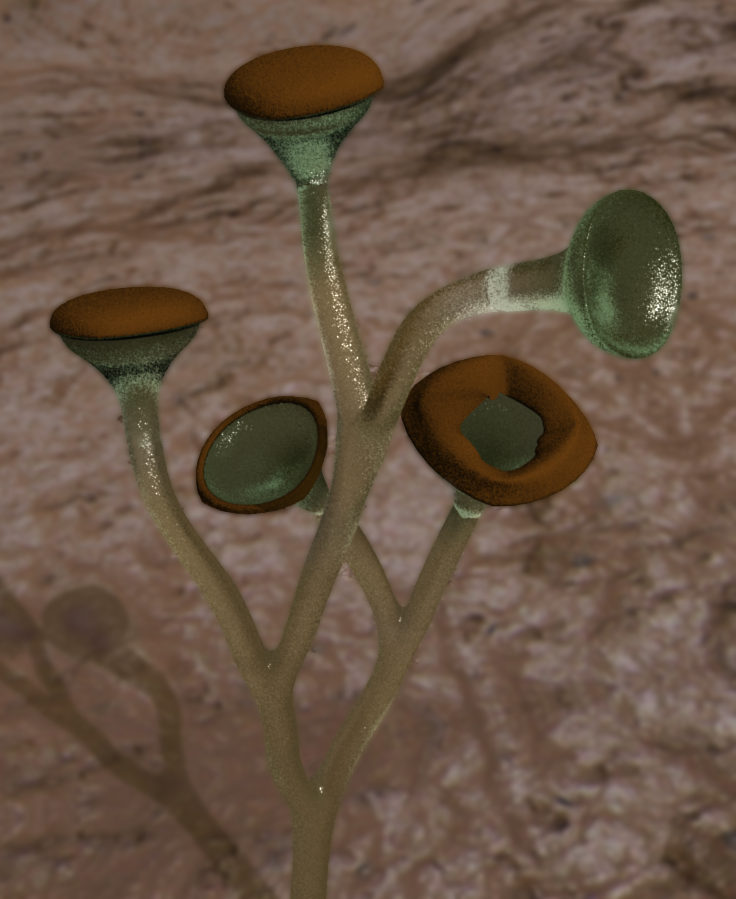
Artist's impression of Cooksonia pertoni

The first fossil records of vascular plants, that is, land plants with vascular tissues, appeared in the Silurian period. The earliest known representatives of this group (mostly from the northern hemisphere) are placed in the genus Cooksonia. They had very simple branching patterns, with the branches terminated by flattened sporangia. By the end of the Silurian much more complex vascular plants, the zosterophylls, had diversified and primitive lycopods, such as Baragwanathia (originally discovered in Silurian deposits in Victoria, Australia), had become widespread.

=== Devonian flora ===
By the Devonian Period, the colonization of the land by plants was well under way. The bacterial and algal mats were joined early in the period by primitive plants that created the first recognizable soils and harbored some arthropods like mites, scorpions and myriapods. Early Devonian plants did not have roots or leaves like the plants most common today, and many had no vascular tissue at all. They probably relied on arbuscular mycorrhizal symbioses with fungi to provide them with water and mineral nutrients such as phosphorus. They probably spread by a combination of vegetative reproduction forming clonal colonies, and sexual reproduction via spores and did not grow much more than a few centimeters tall.

By the Late Devonian, forests of large, primitive plants existed: lycophytes, sphenophytes, ferns, and progymnosperms had evolved. Most of these plants have true roots and leaves, and many were quite tall. The tree-like Archaeopteris, ancestral to the gymnosperms, and the giant cladoxylopsid trees had true wood. These are the oldest known trees of the world's first forests. Prototaxites was the fruiting body of an enormous fungus that stood more than 8 meters tall. By the end of the Devonian, the first seed-forming plants had appeared. This rapid appearance of so many plant groups and growth forms has been called the "Devonian Explosion". The primitive arthropods co-evolved with this diversified terrestrial vegetation structure. The evolving co-dependence of insects and seed-plants that characterizes a recognizably modern world had its genesis in the late Devonian. The development of soils and plant root systems probably led to changes in the speed and pattern of erosion and sediment deposition.

The 'greening' of the continents acted as a carbon dioxide sink, and atmospheric concentrations of this greenhouse gas may have dropped. This may have cooled the climate and led to a massive extinction event. see Late Devonian extinction.

Also in the Devonian, both vertebrates and arthropods were solidly established on the land.

=== Carboniferous flora ===
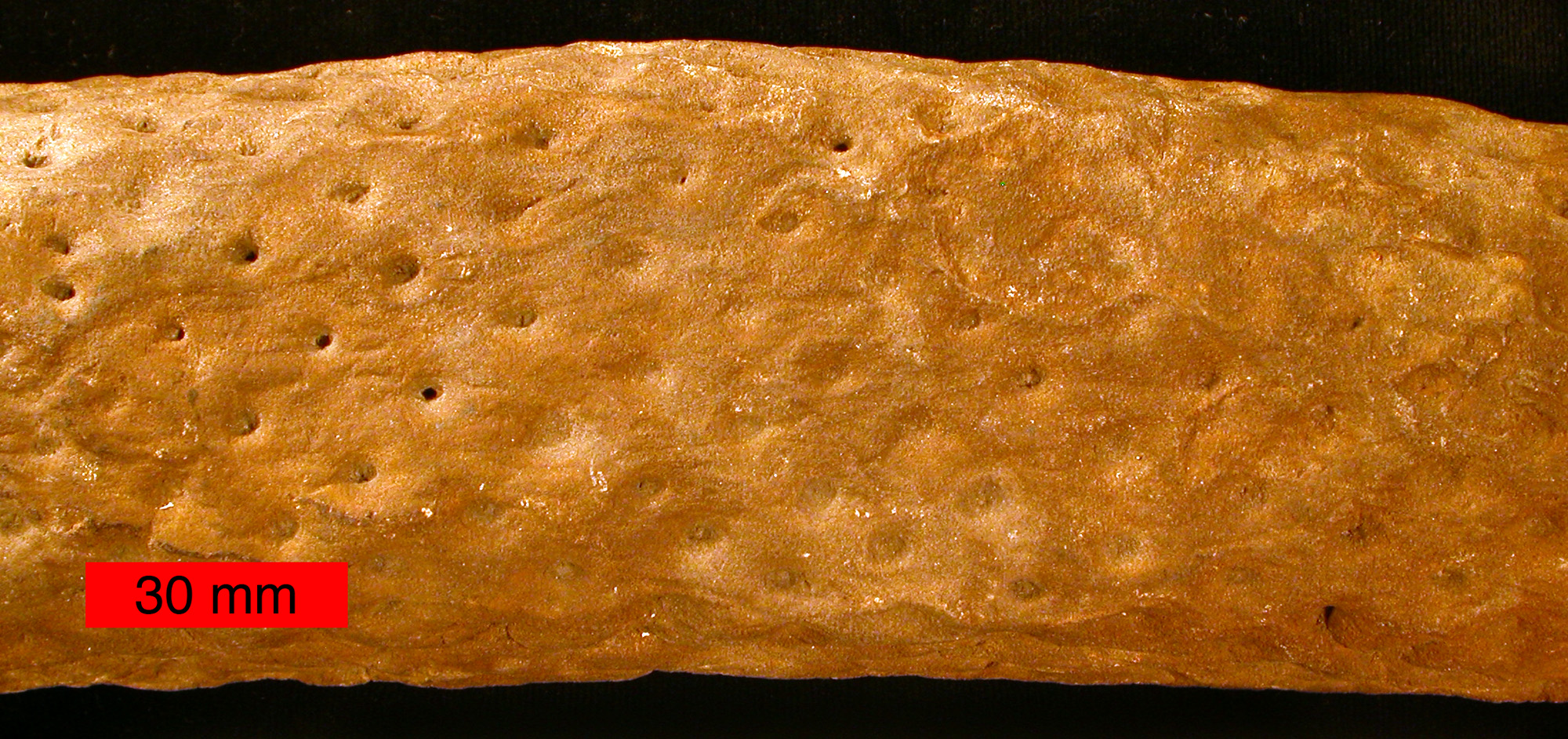
Stigmaria, a fossil tree root. Upper Carboniferous of northeastern Ohio.

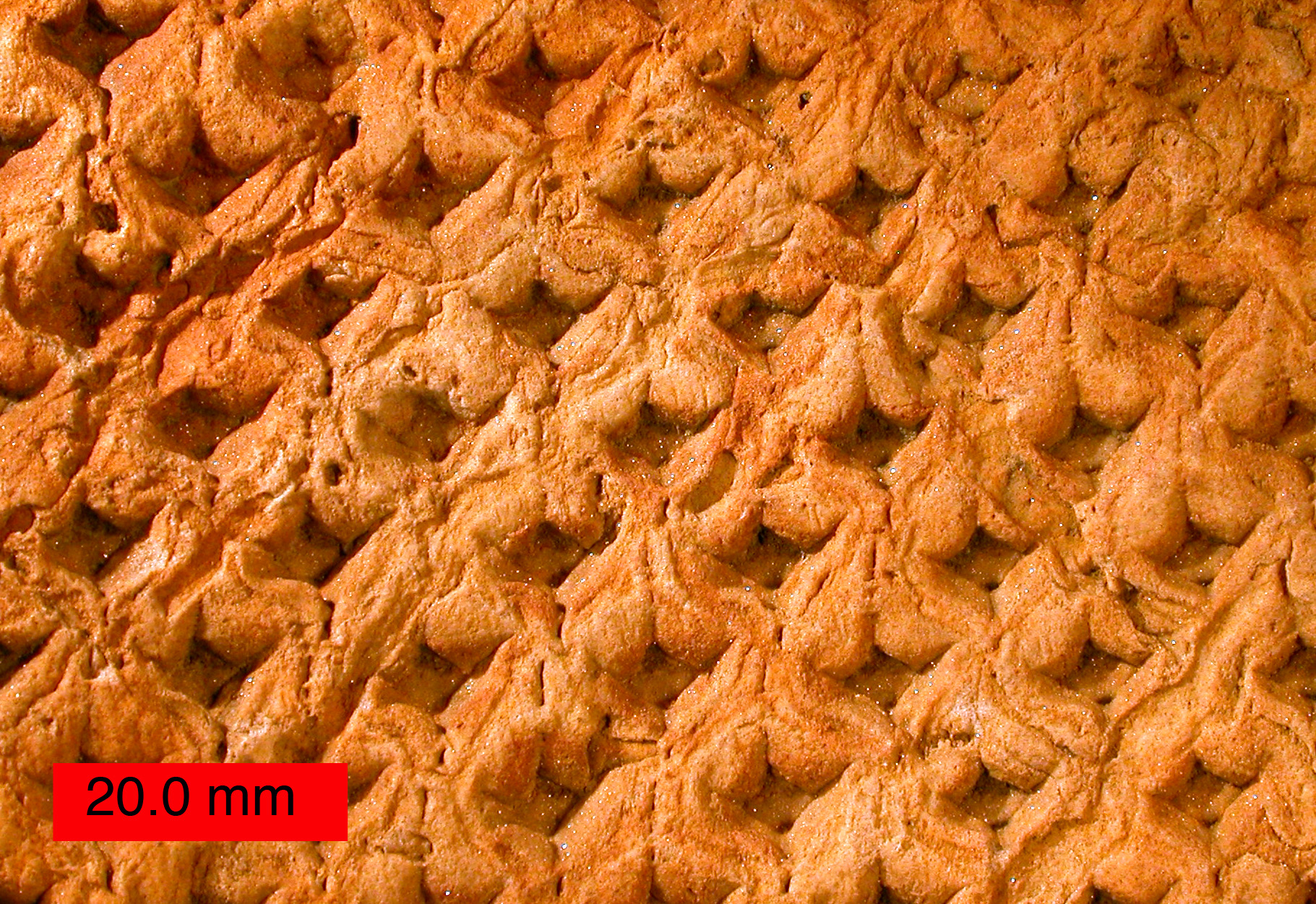
External mold of Lepidodendron from the Upper Carboniferous of Ohio.

Early Carboniferous land plants were very similar to those of the preceding Latest Devonian, but new groups also appeared at this time.

The main Early Carboniferous plants were the Equisetales (Horse-tails), Sphenophyllales (scrambling plants), Lycopodiales (Club mosses), Lepidodendrales (arborescent clubmosses or scale trees), Filicales (Ferns), Medullosales (previously included in the "seed ferns", an artificial assemblage of a number of early gymnosperm groups) and the Cordaitales. These continued to dominate throughout the period, but during late Carboniferous, several other groups, Cycadophyta (cycads), the Callistophytales (another group of "seed ferns"), and the Voltziales (related to and sometimes included under the conifers), appeared.

The Carboniferous lycophytes of the order Lepidodendrales, which were cousins (but not ancestors) of the tiny club-mosses of today, were huge trees with trunks 30 meters high and up to 1.5 meters in diameter. These included Lepidodendron (with its fruit cone called Lepidostrobus), Halonia, Lepidophloios and Sigillaria. The roots of several of these forms are known as Stigmaria.

The fronds of some Carboniferous ferns are almost identical with those of living species. Probably many species were epiphytic. Fossil ferns include Pecopteris and the tree ferns Megaphyton and Caulopteris. Seed ferns or Pteridospermatophyta include Cyclopteris, Neuropteris, Alethopteris, and Sphenopteris.

The Equisetales included the common giant form Calamites, with a trunk diameter of 30 to 60 cm and a height of up to 20 meters. Sphenophyllum was a slender climbing plant with whorls of leaves, which was probably related both to the calamites and the modern horsetails.

Cordaites, a tall plant (6 to over 30 meters) with strap-like leaves, was related to the cycads and conifers; the catkin-like inflorescence, which bore yew-like berries, is called Cardiocarpus. These plants were thought to live in swamps and mangroves. True coniferous trees (Walchia, of the order Voltziales) appear later in the Carboniferous, and preferred higher drier ground.

=== Permian flora ===
The Permian began with the Carboniferous flora still flourishing. About the middle of the Permian there was a major transition in vegetation. The swamp-loving lycopod trees of the Carboniferous, such as Lepidodendron and Sigillaria, were replaced by the more advanced conifers, which were better adapted to the changing climatic conditions. Lycopods and swamp forests still dominated the South China continent because it was an isolated continent and it sat near or at the equator. The Permian saw the radiation of many important conifer groups, including the ancestors of many present-day families. The ginkgos and cycads also appeared during this period. Rich forests were present in many areas, with a diverse mix of plant groups. The gigantopterids thrived during this time; some of these may have been part of the ancestral flowering plant lineage, though flowers evolved only considerably later.

== Mesozoic flora ==
=== Triassic flora ===
On land, the holdover plants included the lycophytes, the dominant cycads, Ginkgophyta (represented in modern times by Ginkgo biloba) and glossopterids. The spermatophytes, or seed plants came to dominate the terrestrial flora: in the northern hemisphere, conifers flourished. Dicroidium (a seed fern) was the dominant southern hemisphere tree during the Early Triassic period.

=== Jurassic flora ===
The arid, continental conditions characteristic of the Triassic steadily eased during the Jurassic period, especially at higher latitudes; the warm, humid climate allowed lush jungles to cover much of the landscape. Conifers dominated the flora, as during the Triassic; they were the most diverse group and constituted the majority of large trees. Extant conifer families that flourished during the Jurassic included the Araucariaceae, Cephalotaxaceae, Pinaceae, Podocarpaceae, Taxaceae and Taxodiaceae. The extinct Mesozoic conifer family Cheirolepidiaceae dominated low latitude vegetation, as did the shrubby Bennettitales. Cycads were also common, as were ginkgos and tree ferns in the forest. Smaller ferns were probably the dominant undergrowth. Caytoniaceous seed ferns were another group of important plants during this time and are thought to have been shrub to small-tree sized. Ginkgo-like plants were particularly common in the mid- to high northern latitudes. In the Southern Hemisphere, podocarps were especially successful, while Ginkgos and Czekanowskiales were rare.

=== Cretaceous flora ===
Flowering plants, also known as angiosperms, spread during this period, although they did not become predominant until near the end of the period (Campanian age). Their evolution was aided by the appearance of bees; in fact angiosperms and insects are a good example of coevolution. The first representatives of many modern trees, including figs, planes and magnolias, appeared in the Cretaceous. At the same time, some earlier Mesozoic gymnosperms, like Conifers continued to thrive, although other taxa like Bennettitales died out before the end of the period.

== Cenozoic flora ==
The Cenozoic began at the Cretaceous–Paleogene extinction event with a massive disruption of plant communities. It then became just as much the age of savannas, or the age of co-dependent flowering plants and insects. At 35 Ma, grasses evolved from among the angiosperms. About ten thousand years ago, humans in the Fertile Crescent of the Middle East develop agriculture. Plant domestication begins with cultivation of Neolithic founder crops. This process of food production, coupled later with the domestication of animals caused a massive increase in human population that has continued to the present. In Jericho (modern West Bank, Palestine), there is a settlement with about 19,000 people. At the same time, Sahara is green with rivers, lakes, cattle, crocodiles and monsoons. At 8 ka, Common (Bread) wheat (Triticum aestivum) originates in southwest Asia due to hybridisation of emmer wheat with a goat-grass, Aegilops tauschii. At 6.5 ka, two rice species are domesticated: Asian rice, Oryza sativa, and African rice Oryza glaberrima.

== Species differentiation ==
- Development of rooted plants
- Flowering plants vs. Conifers
- Ferns and other primitive plants
- Borderline species such as coliform protists

== See also ==
- Plant
- Flora
- Paleobotany
- Plant evolutionary developmental biology
- Evolutionary history of plants
- Timeline of the evolutionary history of life
