= Homoiohydry =

Capacity of plants to regulate water content

Homoiohydry is the capacity of plants to regulate, or achieve homeostasis of, cell and tissue water content. Homoiohydry evolved in land plants to a lesser or greater degree during their transition to land more than 500 million years ago, and is most highly developed in the vascular plants. It is the consequence of a suite of morphological innovations and strategies that enable plant shoots exploring aerial environments to conserve water by internalising the gas exchange surfaces, enclosing them in a waterproof membrane and providing a variable aperture control mechanism, the stomatal guard cells, which regulate the rates of water transpiration and CO_{2} exchange. In vascular plants, water is acquired from the soil by roots and transported via the xylem to aerial portions of the plant. Water evaporation from the aerial surfaces of the plant is controlled by a waterproof covering of cuticle. Gas exchange with the atmosphere is controlled by stomata, which can open and close to control water loss, and diffusion of carbon dioxide to the chloroplasts takes place in intercellular spaces between chlorenchyma cells in the stem or in the mesophyll tissue of the leaf.

The antonym of homoiohydry is poikilohydry, a condition in which plant water content is passively reduced or increased in equilibrium with environmental water status.

== See also ==
- Evolutionary history of plants
