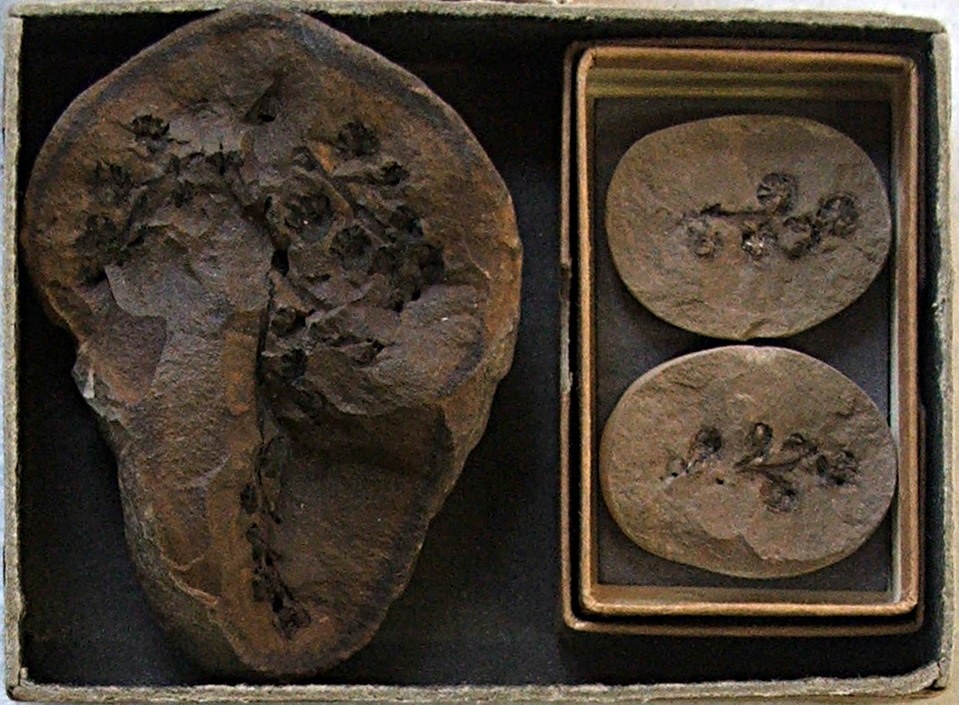
- Specimen P 30369 (left) and the pollen bearing organs of C. hughesiana from Dudley, England
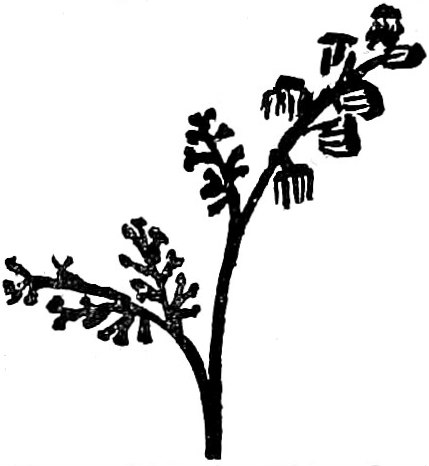
- Reconstruction of C. höninghausi

Scientific classification
- Kingdom: Plantae
- Clade: Tracheophytes
- Division: †Pteridospermatophyta
- Class: †Lyginopteridopsida
- Order: †Lyginopteridales
- Genus: †Crossotheca; Zeiller (1883)

Species
- †C. boulayi Zeiller (1883); †C. communis Lesquererfx; †C. crepini Zeiller (1883); †C. fimbriata Kidston (1906); †C. grievii Potonie (1954); †C. höninghausi Johnson & Kidston (1911) [originally Sphenopteris]; †C. hughesiana Kidston (1906); †C. kentuekiensis Stubbefield, Taylor & Daghlian (1982); †C. kidstom? (nomen dubium); †C. kidstoni Crookall; †C. pinnatifida Gutbier; †C. sagittata Lesquererfx; †C. schatzlarensis; †C. reniformis; †C. trichomanoides; †C. trisecta Sellards

Synonyms
- Sphenopteris höninghausi Brongniart (1849)

= Crossotheca =

Crossotheca Temporal range: Carboniferous-Triassic, 318.1–235.0 Ma

Extinct genus of seed ferns

Crossotheca is an extinct genus of seed ferns (Pteridospermatophyta) widespread in coal measures of Carboniferous, Permian and Triassic age, with possible Devonian remains known from Belgium. The type species is C. crepini, named and described in 1883 by R. Zeiller, and the genus is known from fossils found in Belgium (?), Canada, China, England, France, Hungary, Ireland, Poland and the United States.

One species, C. höninghausi, is the male fructification of Lyginodendron oldhami and the same species is the microsporangia-bearing member of Lyginopteris.

== Description ==
A fertile Crossotheca branch shows the following features:

- The branch tips are slightly expanded into a circular or paddle-shaped limb.
- At the tip of each branch there are a few bilocular sporangia attached together.
- Each sporangium contains a number of microspores (pollens).
