= Agamous =

Plant gene and MADS-box transcription factor

AGAMOUS (AG) is a homeotic gene and MADS-box transcription factor protein present in plants like Arabidopsis thaliana (mouse-ear cress). The TAIR AGI number is AT4G18960.

Floral organ identity across flowering plants is determined by particular combinations of the protein products of homeotic genes, which is described by the ABC model of flower development. These proteins act within regions of undifferentiated cells known as the floral meristem and give the cells a developmental fate. In Arabidopsis thaliana, AG functions as a C-class homeotic gene, where if combined with B-class gene function (APETALA3, PISTILLATA), it promotes stamen development. If AG is not combined with any other ABC homeotic genes, it promotes carpel development. Additionally, AG function results in the cessation of all floral meristem activity by repressing WUSCHEL.

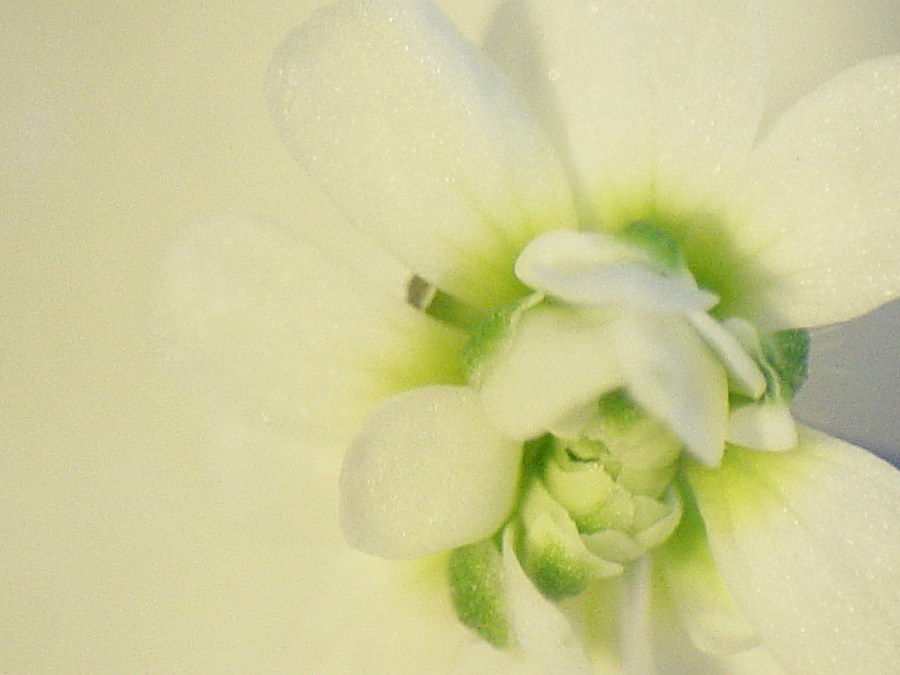
agamous mutant with repeating whorls of sepals and petals.

In the absence of the AG protein, stamens and carpels do not develop and meristem activity continues, resulting in flowers consisting of many whorls of sepals and petals.
