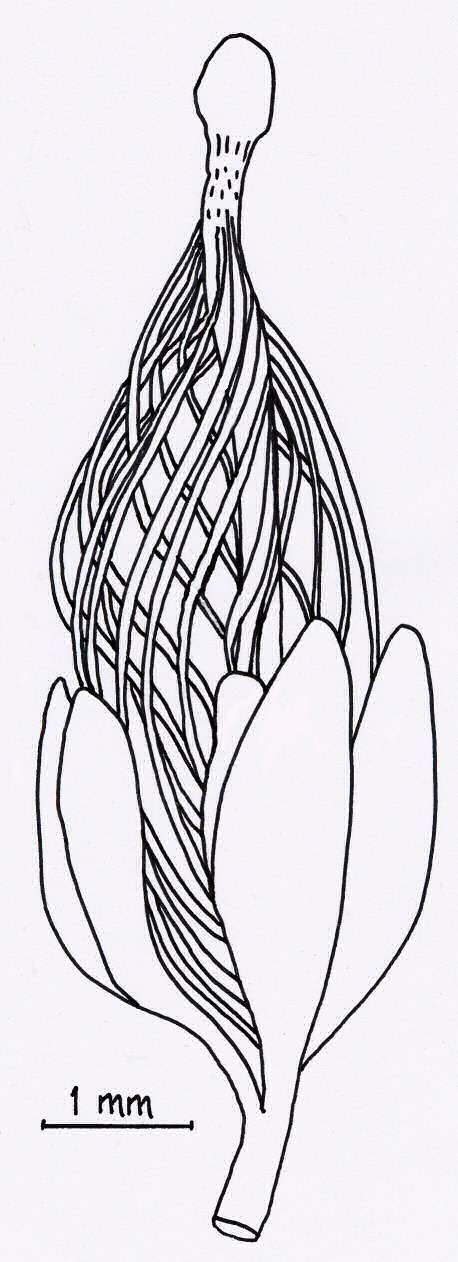
- Runcaria appears to be a transitional fossil precursor of seed plants

Scientific classification
- Kingdom: Plantae
- Clade: Tracheophytes
- Class: †Progymnospermopsida
- Genus: †Runcaria; Stockmans
- Species: †R. heinzelinii

Binomial name
- †Runcaria heinzelinii Stockmans

= Runcaria =

Runcaria Temporal range: Givetian

Extinct genus of Devonian plants

Runcaria heinzelinii is an extinct species of plant from the Middle Devonian of Belgium. It is the only species classified under the genus Runcaria, named after Jean de Heinzelin de Braucourt. It was a precursor to seed plants, predating the earliest of the latter by about 20 million years. The fossil pieces of Runcaria heinzelinii that have been found are short branched stems that at their tips have a radially symmetrical megasporangium surrounded by a cupule. The megasporangium has a multilobed integument, and there is an extension on the megasporangium that suggests an adaptation to wind pollination. Thus, this fossil plant has all of the qualities of seed plants except for a solid seed coat and a system to guide the pollen to the ovulum. It sheds new light on how the seed may have evolved.
