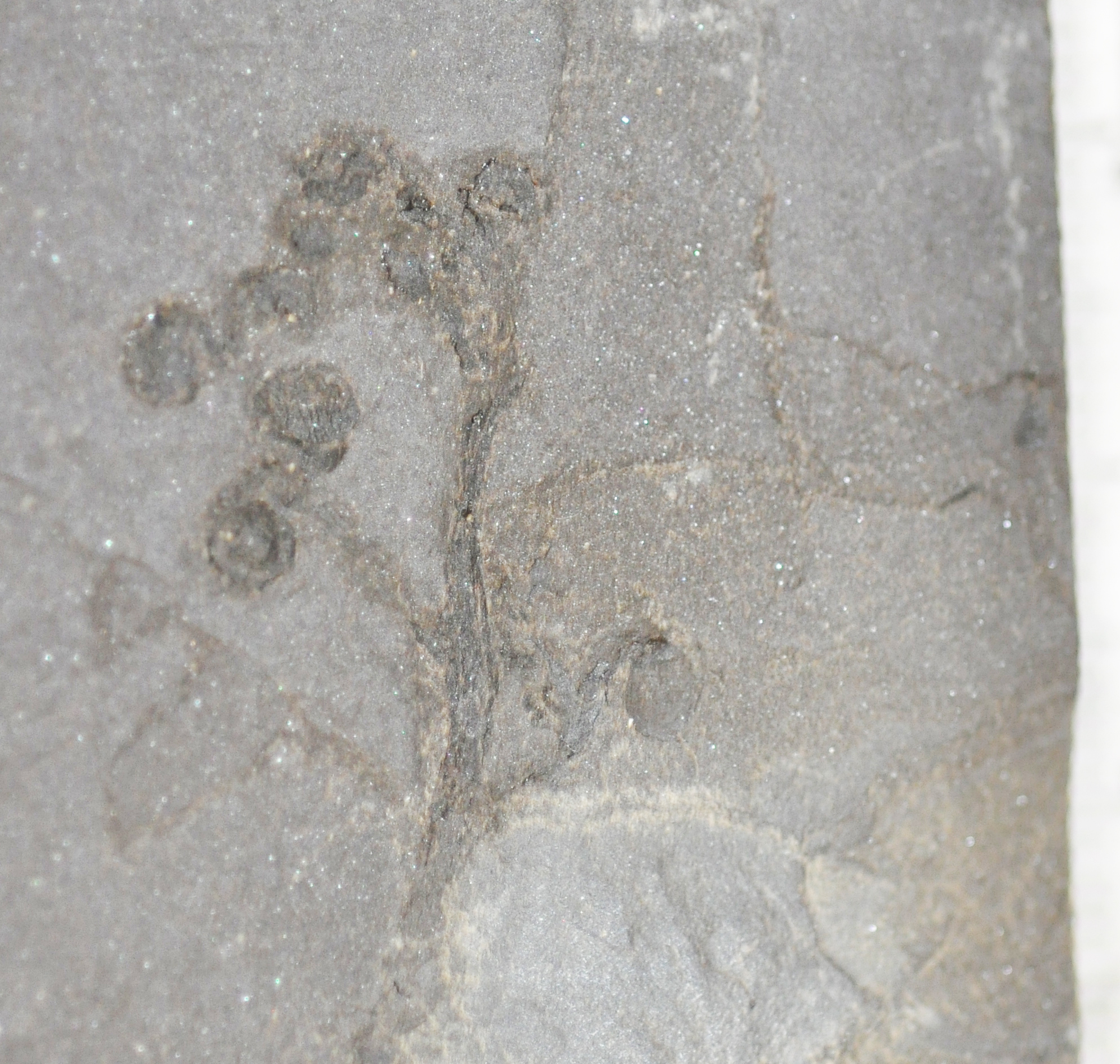
- Umkomasia macleanii ovulate structure, Late Triassic, Molteno Formation, Umkomaas, South Africa.

Scientific classification
- Kingdom: Plantae
- Clade: Tracheophytes
- Order: †Corystospermales
- Family: †Corystospermaceae
- Genus: †Umkomasia; Thomas 1933

Species
- Umkomasia feistmantelii Early Triassic, Australia; Umkomasia macleanii Late Triassic South Africa; ?Umkomasia mongolica Early Cretaceous (Aptian-Albian), Mongolia

= Umkomasia =

Umkomasia Temporal range: Early Triassic–Late Triassic

Extinct genus of seed ferns

Umkomasia is a genus of seed bearing organs produced by corystosperm seed ferns, first based on fossils collected by Hamshaw Thomas from the Burnera Waterfall locality near the Umkomaas River of South Africa. He recognized on the basis of cuticular similarities that the same plant produced pollen organs Pteruchus and the leaves Dicroidium. Various other corystosperm seed bearing organs from the Jurassic and Cretaceous have been assigned to this genus, but recently have been given distinct genera, with Umkomasia being restricted to the Triassic.

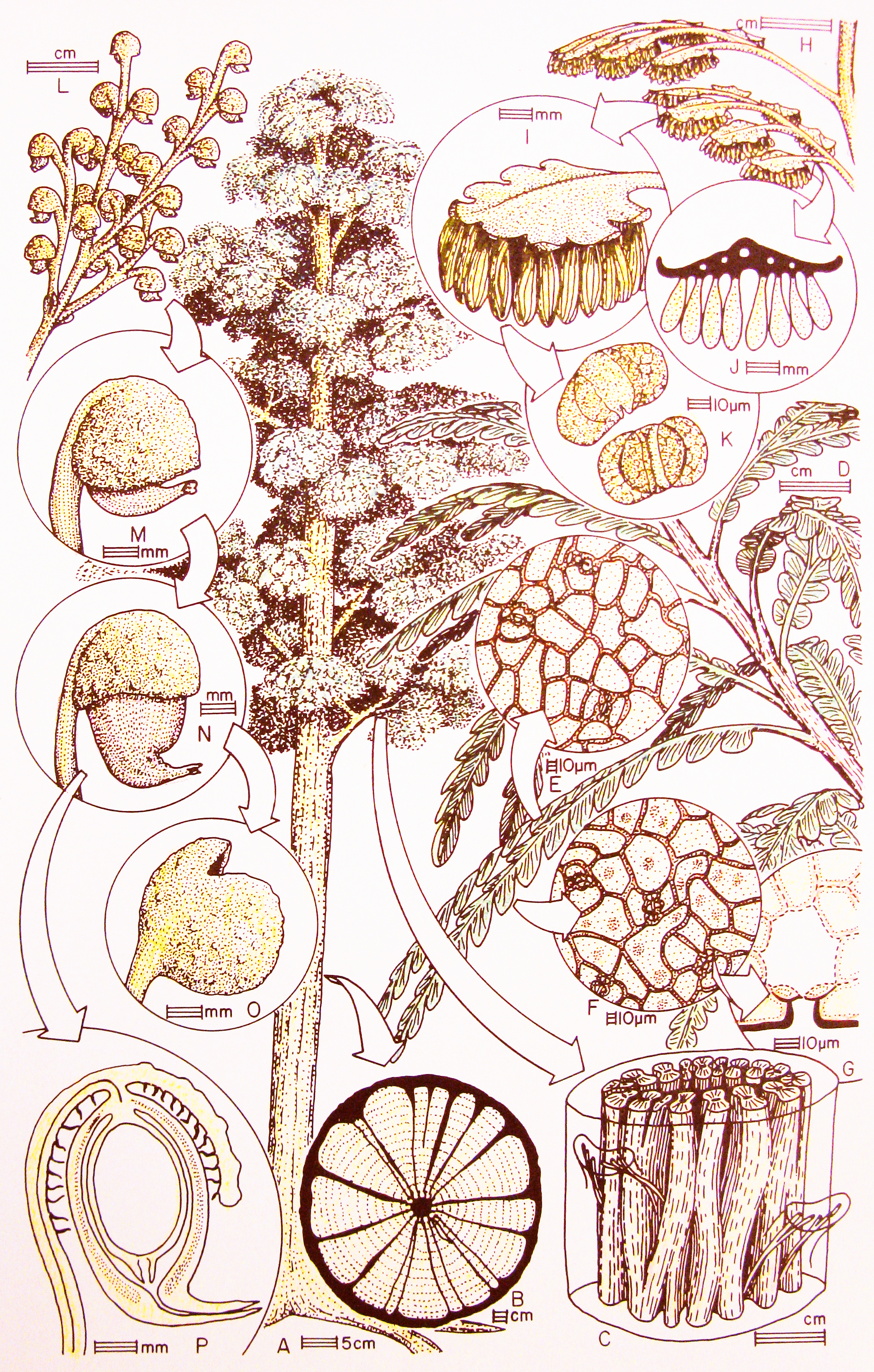
Umkomasia macleanii reconstruction with pollen organs (Pteruchus africanus) and leaves (Dicroidium odontopteroides) from the Late Triassic, Molteno Formation of South Africa

== Description ==
Umkomasia has helmet like cupules around ovules born in complex large branching structures.

== Whole plant associations ==
- Umkomasia feistmantelii from the Early Triassic of Australia may have been produced by the same plant as Pteruchus barrealensis (pollen organs) and Dicroidium zuberi (leaves)
- Umkomasia macleanii from the Late Triassic of South Africa may have been produced by the same plant as Pteruchus africanus (pollen organs) and Dicroidium odontopteroides (leaves)

== Reassigned species ==
- U. franconica Lower Jurassic, Germany, reassigned to the genus Kirchmuellia
- U. asiatica Triassic, China reassigned to the genus Stenorachis
- U. mongolica Lower Cretaceous, Mongolia, moved to the genus Doylea.

== See also ==
- Evolution of plants
