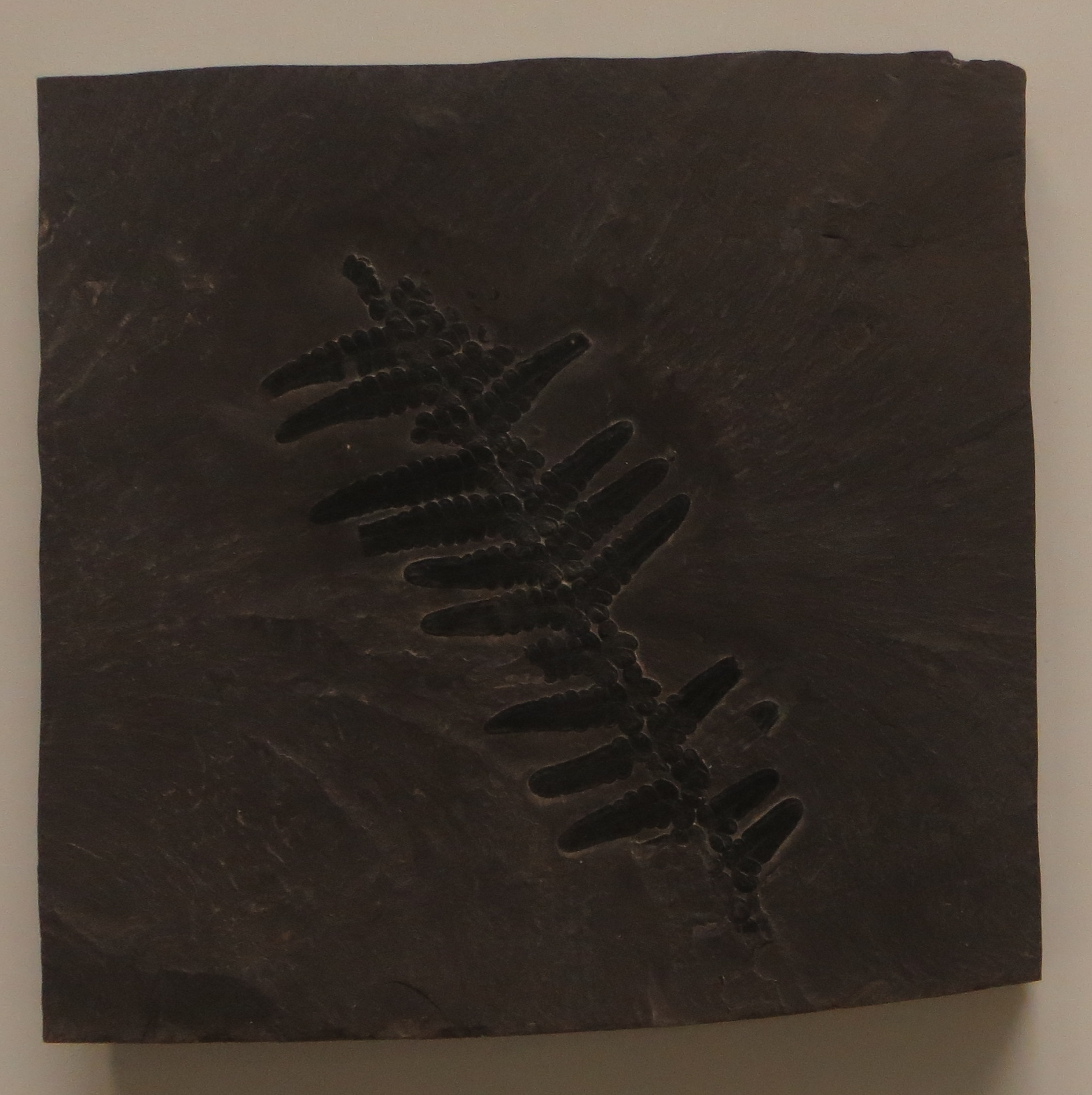

Scientific classification
- Kingdom: Plantae
- Division: †Pteridospermatophyta
- Order: †Peltaspermales
- Genus: Pachypteris (Brongn. 1828) T.M.Harris.

Species
- See text

Synonyms
- Thinnfeldia

= Pachypteris =

Pachypteris Temporal range: Early Triassic - Early Cretaceous

Mesozoic pteridosperm leaf fossil

Pachypteris is an extinct Mesozoic pteridosperm ("seed fern") genus of fossil leaves. It has either been aligned with the peltasperms or the corystosperms.

== Description ==
Pachypteris is represented by hypostomatic, bipinnate or unipinnate leaves, with alethopteridian venation (midvein and secondary veins divided once or twice before reaching the pinnule margin), pinnules with entire margins and rounded apices. The stomata are haplocheilic, monocyclic or dicyclic, usually depressed, with the guard cells occurring in the lowermost part of the stoma.

== Taxonomy ==
The affinities of Pachypteris lay with Cycadopteris, Komlopteris, Dicroidium (a typical Corystospermalean foliage) and Ptilozamites. It includes the former denomination Thinnfeldia Ettingshausen 1852, a junior synonym of Pachypteris, as Doludenko (1971) showed. The genus was detailed by Harris (1964), Doludenko (1974), Schweitzer and Kirchner (1998), Popa (2000), and Gordenko (2007). The genus Komlopteris, a segregate from Pachypteris, was defined by Barbacka (1994).

Pachypteris includes about 20 species ranging from late Triassic to Lower Cretaceous, such as P. speciosa, P. rhomboidalis, P. gradinarui, etc. This genus is mainly a boreal taxon, being extensively reported in Europe, Iran, Afghanistan, China and North America, but it has been cited from Gondwanic occurrences as well, such as India, Argentina and Australia.

== Distribution ==
Fossils of Pachypteris have been registered in:

=== Triassic ===
Brazil, China, Germany, Japan, and the Russian Federation

=== Jurassic ===
Antarctica, Argentina, Australia, Colombia (Valle Alto Formation, Caldas), France, Georgia, India, Iran, Italy, Japan, Lithuania, Norway, Poland, Romania, the Russian Federation, Serbia and Montenegro, Tajikistan, the United Kingdom, and Uzbekistan.

=== Cretaceous ===
Argentina

== Species ==
There are 9 species of Pachypteris:

- P. auriculata
- P. brevipinnata
- P. crassa
- P. elegans
- P. gangapurensis
- P. haburensis
- P. holdenii
- P. indica
- P. lanceolata
