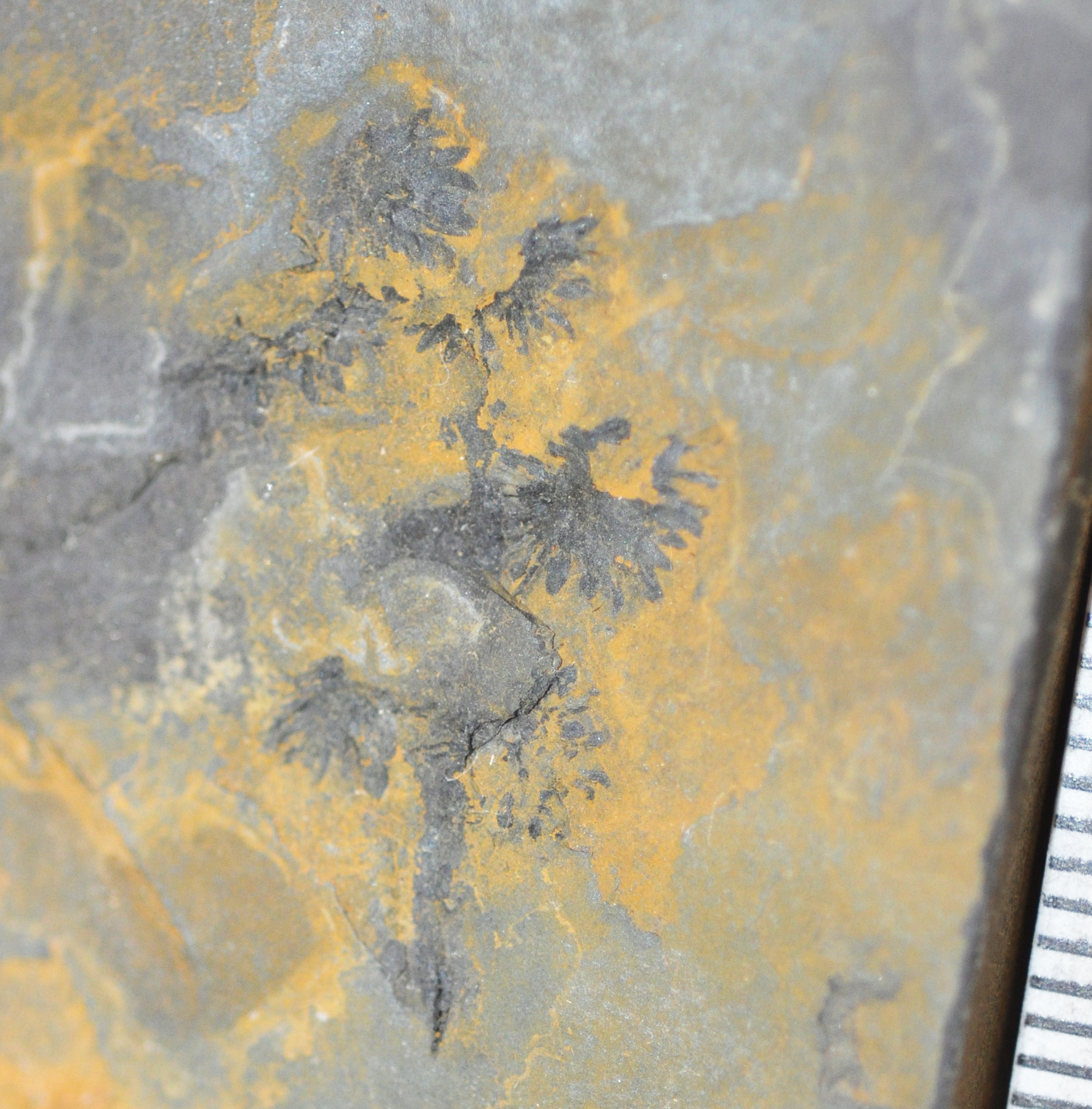
- Pteruchus africanus fossil pollen organ, Late Triassic, Molteno Formation, Umkomaas, South Africa.

Scientific classification
- Kingdom: Plantae
- Clade: Tracheophytes
- Order: †Corystospermales
- Family: †Corystospermaceae
- Genus: †Pteruchus; Thomas (1933)

= Pteruchus =

Pteruchus Temporal range: Triassic

Extinct genus of seed ferns

Pteruchus is a form genus for pollen organs of the seed fern (Pteridospermatophyta family Umkomasiaceae. It was first described by Hamshaw Thomas from the Umkomaas locality of South Africa. It is associated with the seed bearing organs Umkomasia and Dicroidium leaves.

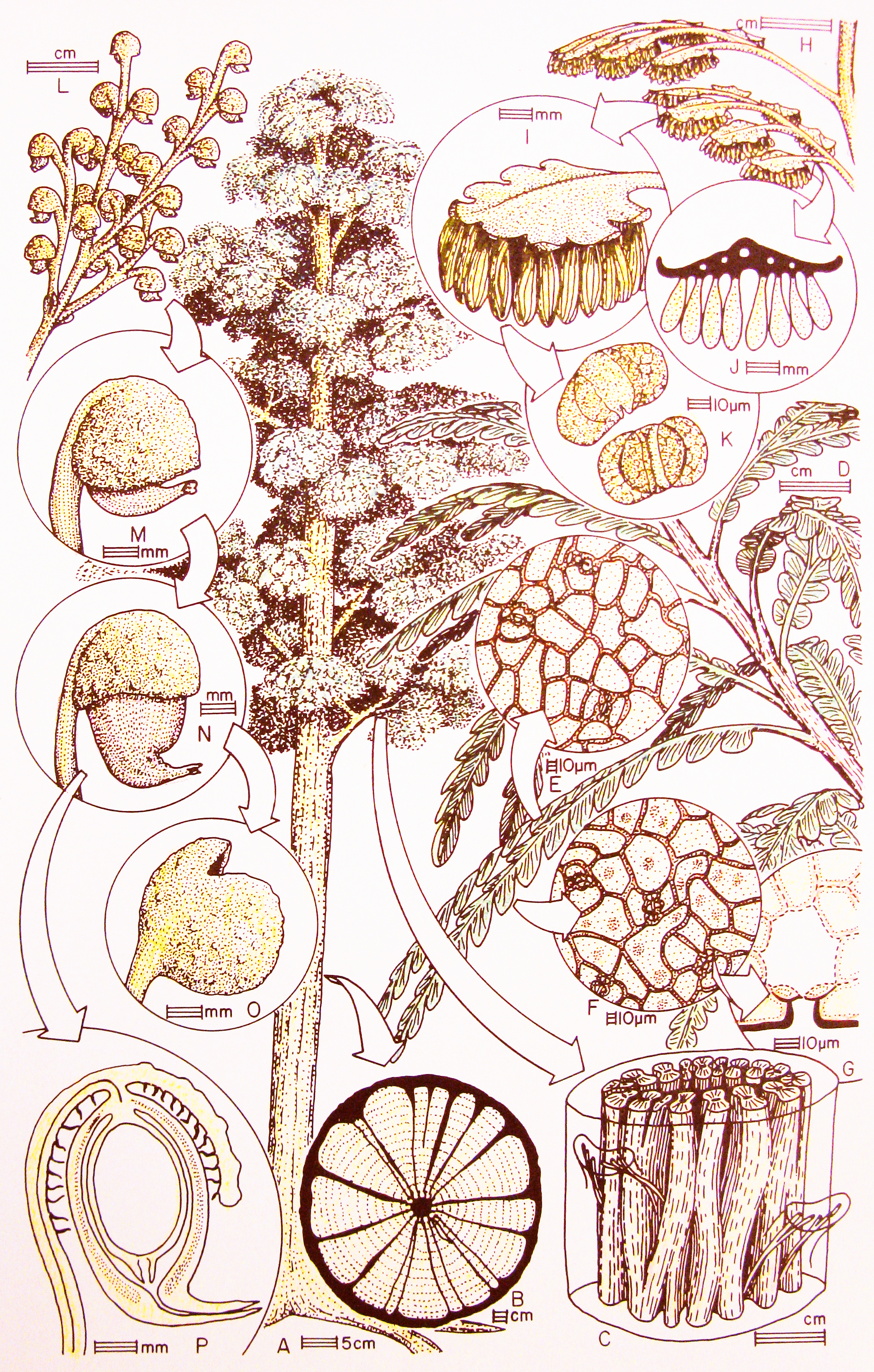
Umkomasia macleani reconstruction of whole plant including leaves (Dicroidium odontopteroides, pollen organs (Pteruchus africanus based largely on material from the Umkomaas locality of South Africa

== Description ==
The pollen organ Pteruchus differs from other seed fern pollen organs in having numerous pendant pollen sacs from a blade-like head, in an arrangement similar to an epaulette.

== Whole plant reconstructions ==
- Pteruchus africanus may have been produced by the same plant as Umkomasia macleanii (ovulate organs) and Dicroidium odontopteroides (leaves), based on cuticular similarities between these leaves and reproductive structures at the Umkomaas locality of South Africa.
- Pteruchus barrealensis may have been produced by the same plant as Umkomasia feistmantelii (ovulate organs) and Dicroidium zuberi (leaves), based on cuticular similarities between these leaves and reproductive structures near Sydney Australia.
- Pteruchus septentrionalis from the Lower Jurassic of Germany has been placed in the separate genus Muelkirchium.
