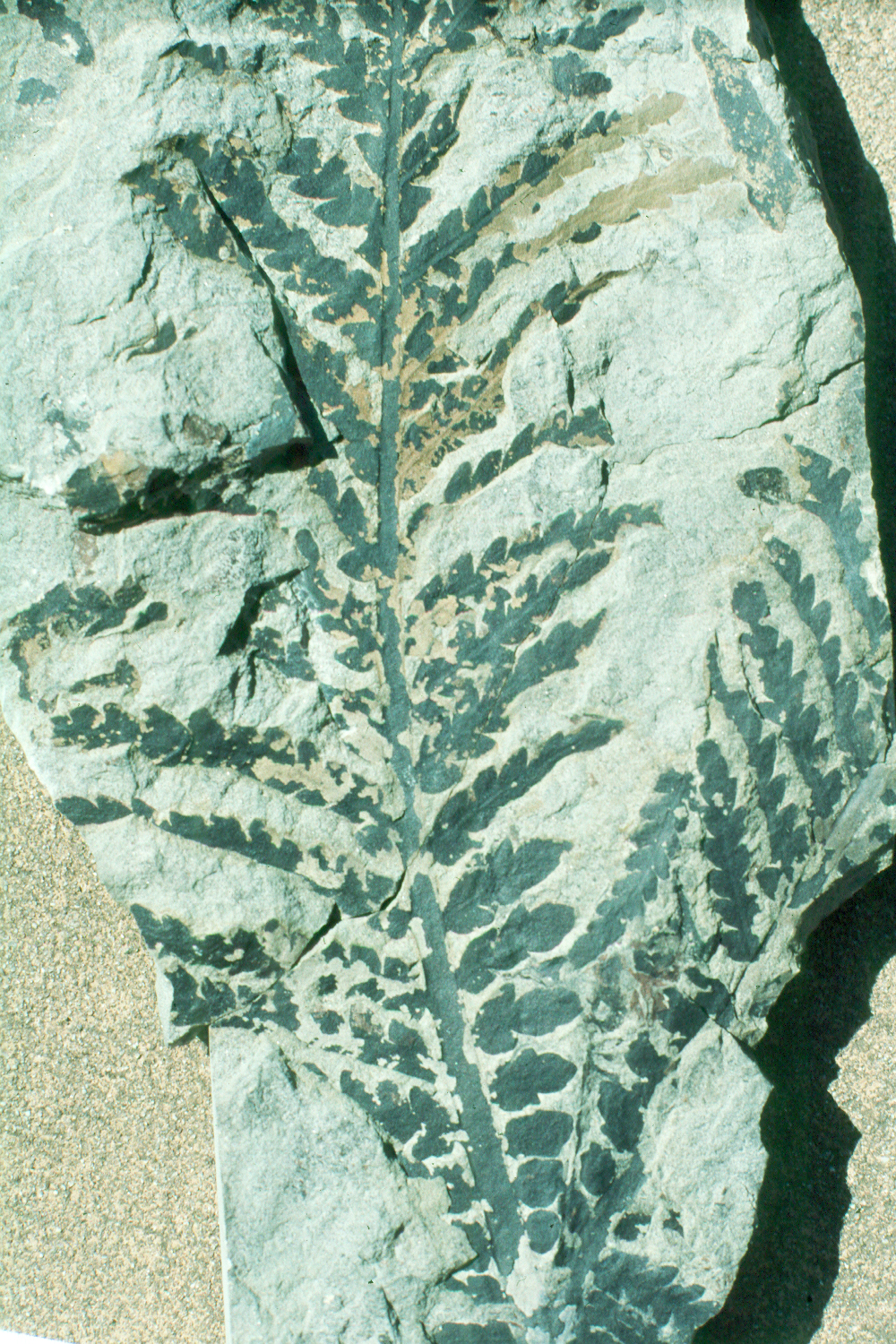
- Leaf impression of Dicroidium zuberi

Scientific classification
- Kingdom: Plantae
- Clade: Tracheophytes
- Order: †Corystospermales
- Family: †Corystospermaceae
- Genus: †Dicroidium; Gothan (1912)

Species
- Dicroidium crassinervis Australia, Antarctica, South Africa; Dicroidium coriaceum, Australia, Antarctica, South Africa; Dicroidium dubium Australia, Antarctica, South Africa; Dicroidium odontopteroides, Australia, New Zealand, Antarctica, India, South Africa, Argentina, Brazil; Dicroidium sinensis, China; Dicroidium stelznerianum, Australia, New Zealand, Antarctica, South Africa, Argentina; Dicroidium zuberi, Antarctica, Australia, South Africa, Brazil

Synonyms
- Johnstonia Walkom; Harringtonia Frenguelli; Dicroidiopsis Frenguelli; Diplasiophyllum Frenguelli; Zuberia Frenguelli; Xylopteris Frenguelli; Tetraptilon Frenguelli; Hoegia Townrow; Jordaniopteris Anderson

= Dicroidium =

Dicroidium Temporal range: Late Permian–Sinemurian

Extinct genus of corystosperm seed ferns

Dicroidium is an extinct genus of fork-leaved seed plants. It is the archetypal genus of the corystosperms, an extinct group of seed plants, often called "seed ferns", assigned to the order Corystospermales or Umkomasiales. Species of Dicroidium, which grew as large trees, were widely distributed and dominant over Gondwana during the Triassic (252 to 201 million years ago). Their fossils are known from South Africa, the Arabian Peninsula, Australia, New Zealand, South America, Madagascar, the Indian subcontinent and Antarctica.

== Description ==
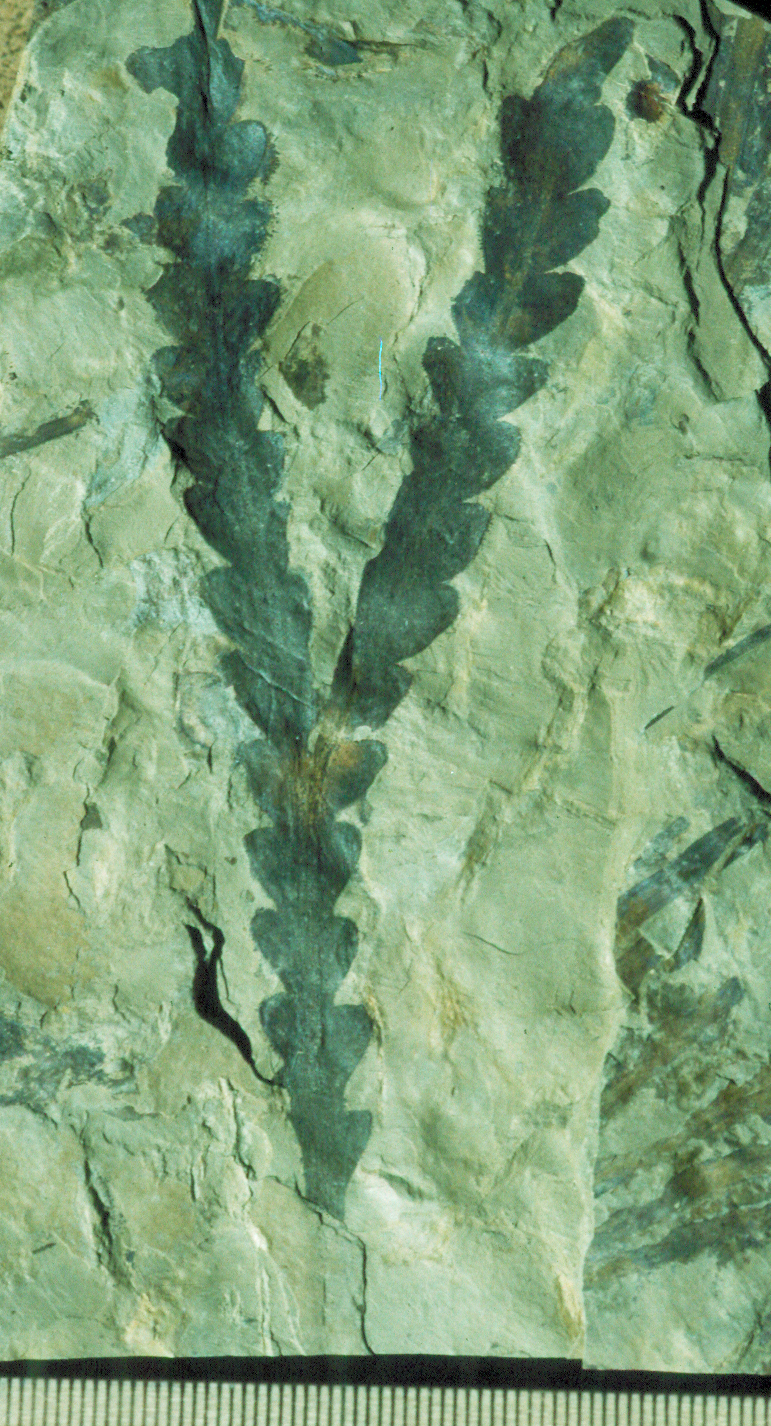
Dicroidium odontopteroides fossil leaf, Late Triassic Molteno Formation near Birds River South Africa.

Within the form genus classification system used in paleobotany, the genus Dicroidium refers specifically to the leaves. Some authors have suggested dividing Dicroidium up into several genera, including Dicroidiopsis, Diplasiophyllum, Zuberia, Xylopteris, Johnstonia and Tetraptilon, but this is rejected by other authors. The leaves of Dicroidium bifurcate (fork) at their base, which is characteristic of all species. The leaves are highly variable in size and morphology, ranging from simple to tripinnate, with the individual leaflets having varying morphologies, including dissected, lobed, needle-like and entire. Some leaf specimens have more than one type of leaflet morphology, which may have been the result of hybridisation between different species. The venation of the leaves is also highly variable, encompassing taeniopteroid, odontopteroid, alethopteroid and simple morphologies.

=== Whole plant ===
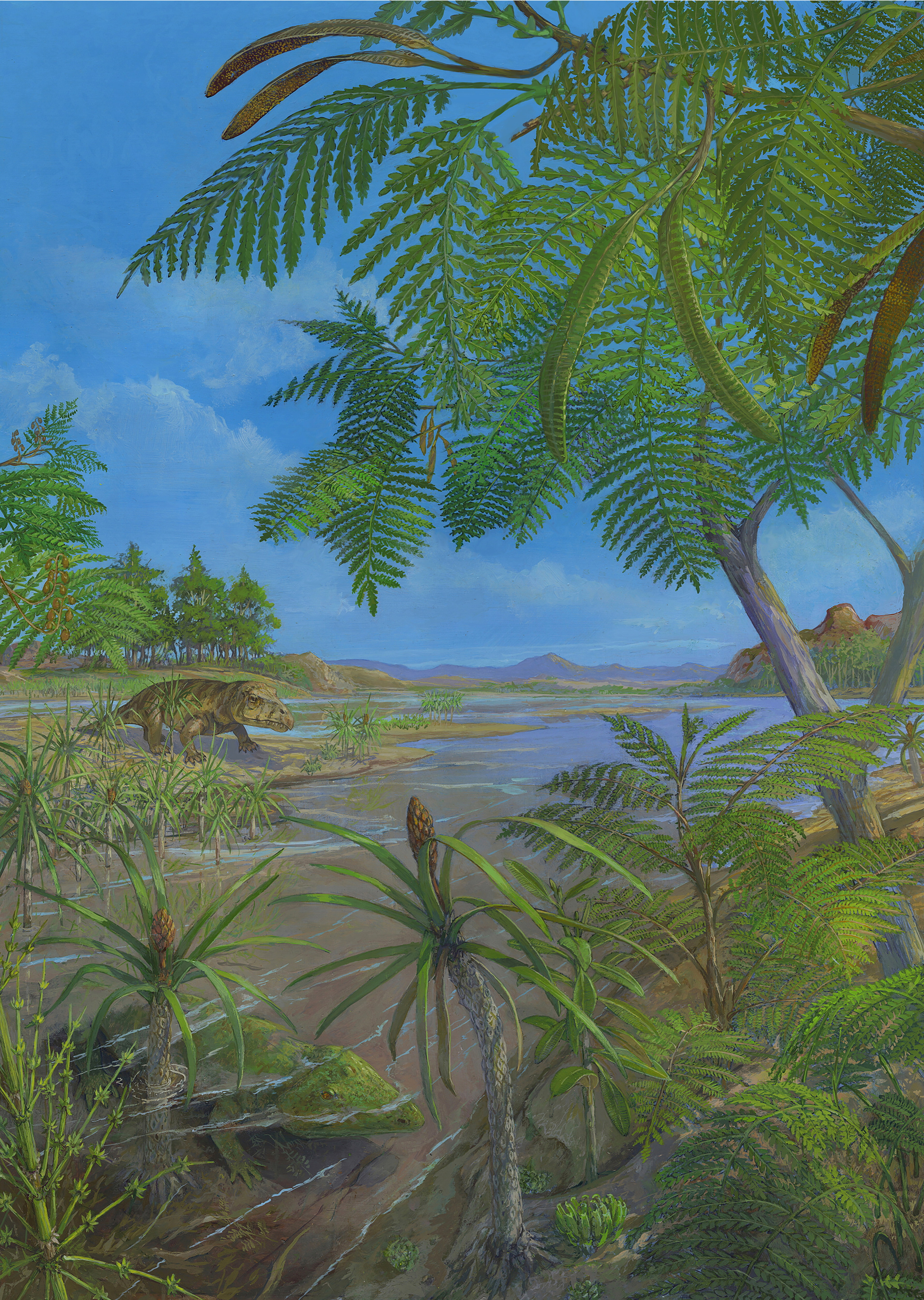
Reconstruction of the Dicroidium plants (with young Dicroidium tree with attached Pteruchus on right side, as well as Dicroidium leaves with Umkomasia on left side, with mature Dicroidium trees in background left) in an Early Triassic landscape in southeastern Australia. Art by Michael Rothman

Dicroidium plants grew as medium-large sized trees, with some preserved trunk sections 10 metres (33 ft) tall and over 50 centimetres (20 in) wide, with the wood assigned to the genera Kykloxylon and Rhexoxylon. The ovulate reproductive structures are usually assigned to the genus Umkomasia, while the pollen-producing organs are assigned to the genus Pteruchus, with pollen attributable to the genus Falcisporites. These structures are almost never found in organic connection, and their placement as part of the same plant primarily relies on their repeated co-occurrence with each other, and the similarities in the morphology of their cuticles. The leaves grew on short protuberances attached to the stem in a similar way to living Ginkgo biloba. The leaves of Dicroidium are suggested to have been deciduous, and shed along with the reproductive organs during the winter. The seeds and pollen are suggested to have been wind dispersed. At least some of the Antarctic species are suggested to have engaged in prolific bark shedding.

Possible whole plant associations include:

- Dicroidium odontopteroides may have been produced by the same plant as Umkomasia macleanii (ovulate structures) and Pteruchus africanus (pollen organs).
- Dicroidium zuberi may have been produced by the same plant as Umkomasia feistmantelii (ovulate structures) and Pteruchus barrealensis (pollen organs)

== Evolution ==
The earliest Dicroidium species are known from the Late Permian aged Umm Irna Formation of Jordan, which inhabited equatorial humid tropical environments, as well as equivalently aged more southerly subtropical deposits on the Indian subcontinent. Following the end-Permian mass extinction, Dicroidium expanded its range southwards across Gondwana, including South Africa, Antarctica, Australia, New Zealand and South America, with a record also reported from the Middle Triassic of China. Later Triassic Dicroidium-bearing plants were dominant large canopy forming trees in temperate wetland and forested habitats at mid-high latitudes, extending to the South Pole. Dicroidium-dominated ecosystems in Gondwana collapsed during the end-Triassic mass extinction, with Dicroidium surviving in parts of East Antarctica into the Early Jurassic (Sinemurian).

== See also ==
- Glossopteris extinct tree that held a comparable position in Gondwana during the preceding Permian period
