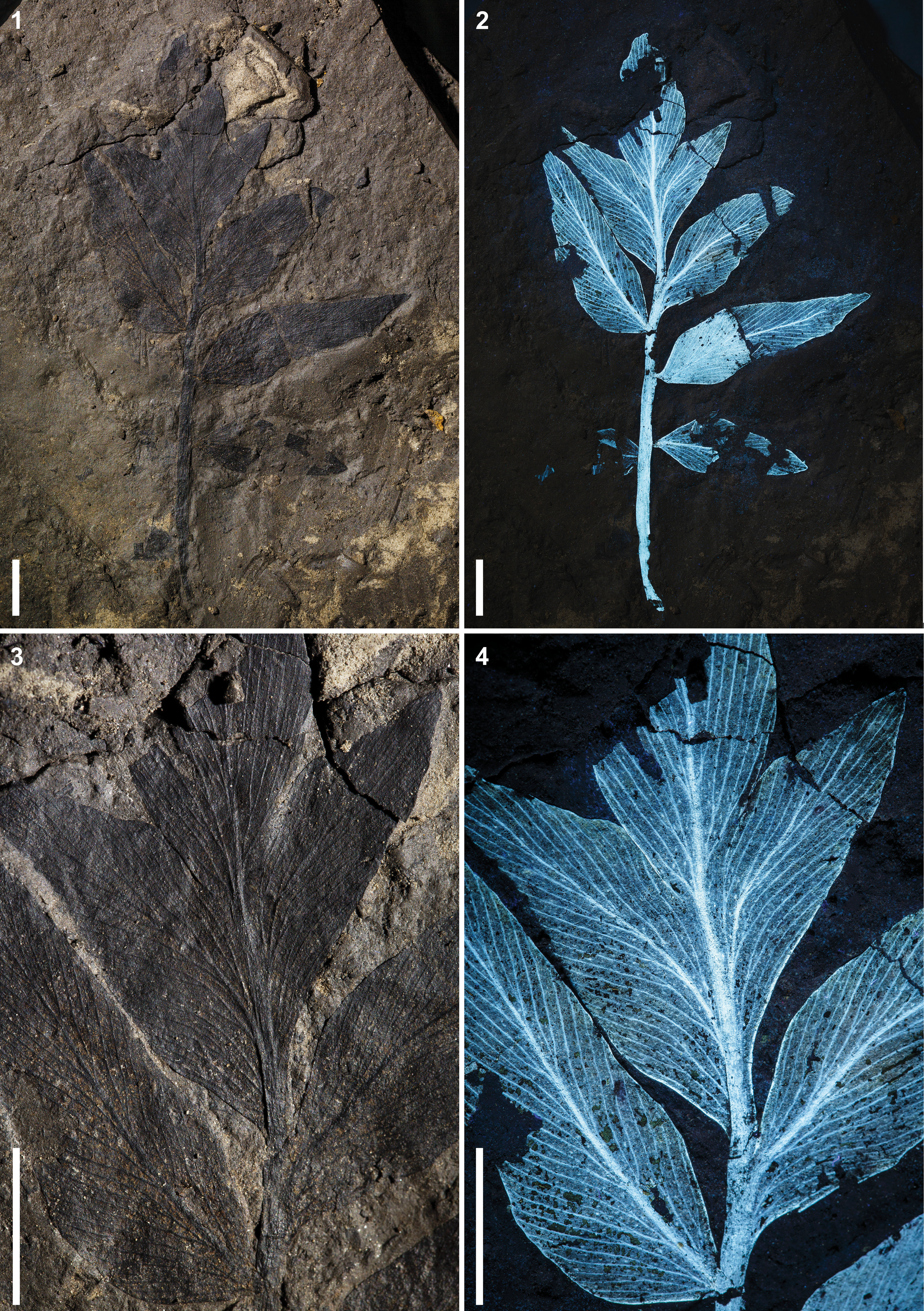
- Specimen of Komlopteris cenozoicus

Scientific classification
- Kingdom: Plantae
- Clade: Tracheophytes
- Order: †Corystospermales
- Family: †Corystospermaceae
- Genus: †Komlopteris; Barbacka, 1994

Type species
- Komlopteris nordenskioeldii (Nathorst, 1878) Barbacka, 1994

Species
- K. nordenskioeldii; K. rotundata; K. speciosa; K. distinctiva; K. cenozoicus; K. victoriensis: K. indica; K. tiruchirapalliense; K. purlawaughensis; K. khatangiensis; K. constricta; K. artabeae; K. nestarensis

Synonyms
- Alicurana Herbst and Gnaedinger, 2002

= Komlopteris =

Komlopteris Temporal range: Late Triassic to Eocene Rhaetian–Ypresian

Extinct genus of seed fern

Komlopteris is an extinct genus of "seed fern" with possible corystosperm affinities. Fossils have been found across both hemispheres, dating from the latest Triassic to the early Eocene (Ypresian), making it the youngest "seed fern" in the fossil record.

== Morphology ==
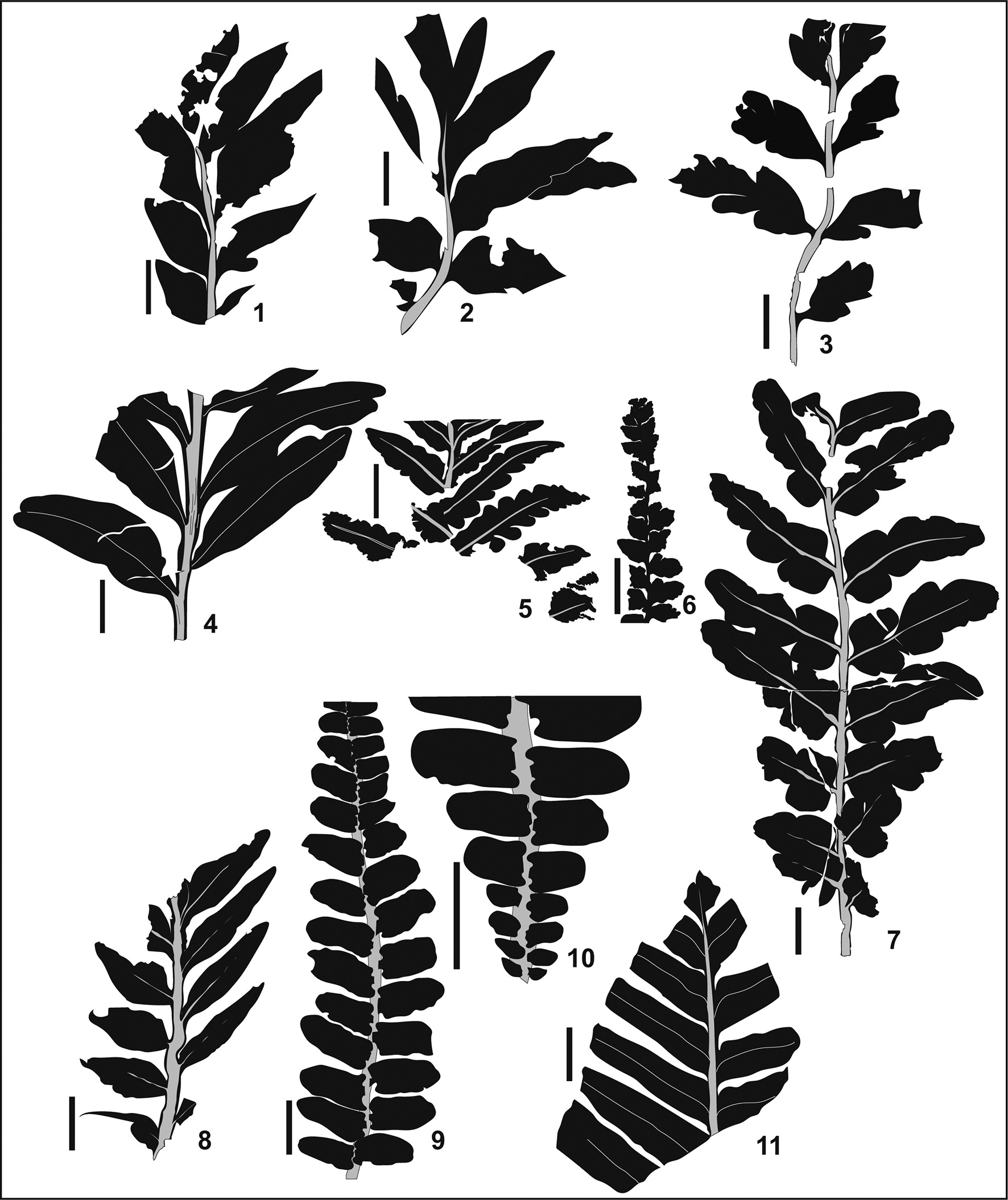
Silhouettes of various species of Komlopteris.(1) K. cenozoicus (2) K. victoriensis (3) K. boolensis (4) K. indica (5) K. tiruchirapalliense (6) K. khatangiensis (7) K. purlawaughensis (8) K. constricta (9-10) K. artabeae (11) K. nestarensis scale bars = 10 mm

Within the form classification system used in paleobotany, Komlopteris is used to refer to leaves. The leaves are generally lanceolate to slightly falcate, though some are ovate, and form a pinnate arrangement, and are sometimes bipinnate. The cuticles are thick, with at least some having resin bodies within the leaves.

== Ecology ==
Gondwanan Komlopteris species are often associated with fern-dominated, humid temperate, forested habitats. The finding of numerous leaves of Komlopteris in single leaf mat layers suggests that at least some species were deciduous. A 1998 study suggested that the type species Komlopteris nordenskioeldii likely grew as a tree, based on the presence of distinct sun and shade leaves, as is found in living angiosperm trees.

== Affinities ==
Komlopteris is not known to be definitively associated with any reproductive organs, though corystoperm-like ovulate and pollen producing reproductive organs, as well as corystosperm-like Alisporites/Falcisporites pollen have been found in the same strata at a number of localities. Its leaf architecture and venation closely resembles that of the archetypal corystosperm Dicroidium, as well as to Kurtziana and Pachypteris, which are also suggested to be a corystoperms, with the particularly close resemblance to Kurtziana leading to suggestions that they form part of the same lineage. However, some authors have suggested that the ovulate reproducive organ Sacculotheca from the Early Jurassic of Hungary, which co-occurs with Komlopteris and shares a similar stomatal pattern, is part of the same plant. Sacculotheca differs strongly in morphology from typical corystosperm reproductive organs like Umkomasia, meaning that if its association with Komlopteris is real, it would bring its corystosperm affinities into doubt.

== Taxonomy ==
Komlopteris was named by Barbacka in 1994, to include leaves originally included in Thinnfeldia and Pachypteris. The type species is K. nordenskioeldii, known from the earliest Jurassic (Hettangian) of Sweden, as well as other parts of Europe like Hungary (Mecsek Coal Formation). Other Northern Hemisphere species include K. rotundata from the Late Triassic (Rhaetian) of Sweden, K. speciosa from the Middle Jurassic (Bathonian) Taynton Limestone Formation of England, and K. distinctiva from the Early Jurassic of Poland. The oldest species from Gondwana are from Argentina, dating to the Early Jurassic, assigned to the species, K. artabeae and K. nestarensis ,which were originally assigned to the genus Alicurana, which was considered a synonym of Komlopteris in a 2023 review of the genus. Species known from the Late Jurassic include K. khatangiensis from India, K. constricta from the Antarctic Peninsula, and K. purlawaughensis from the Talbragar Fish Bed in NSW, Australia. K. tiruchirapalliense is known from the Early Cretaceous of both southern India and Western Australia. Other Early Cretaceous species include K. indica from the Indian subcontinent, K. boolensis from Australia (Victoria and Queensland), and K. victoriensis from the Early Cretaceous of Victoria, Australia and New Zealand, and the early Late Cretaceous (Cenomanian) of Queensland, Australia. The youngest known species is K. cenozoicus from the early Eocene (Ypresian) of Tasmania, which are the youngest known remains of any "seed fern".
