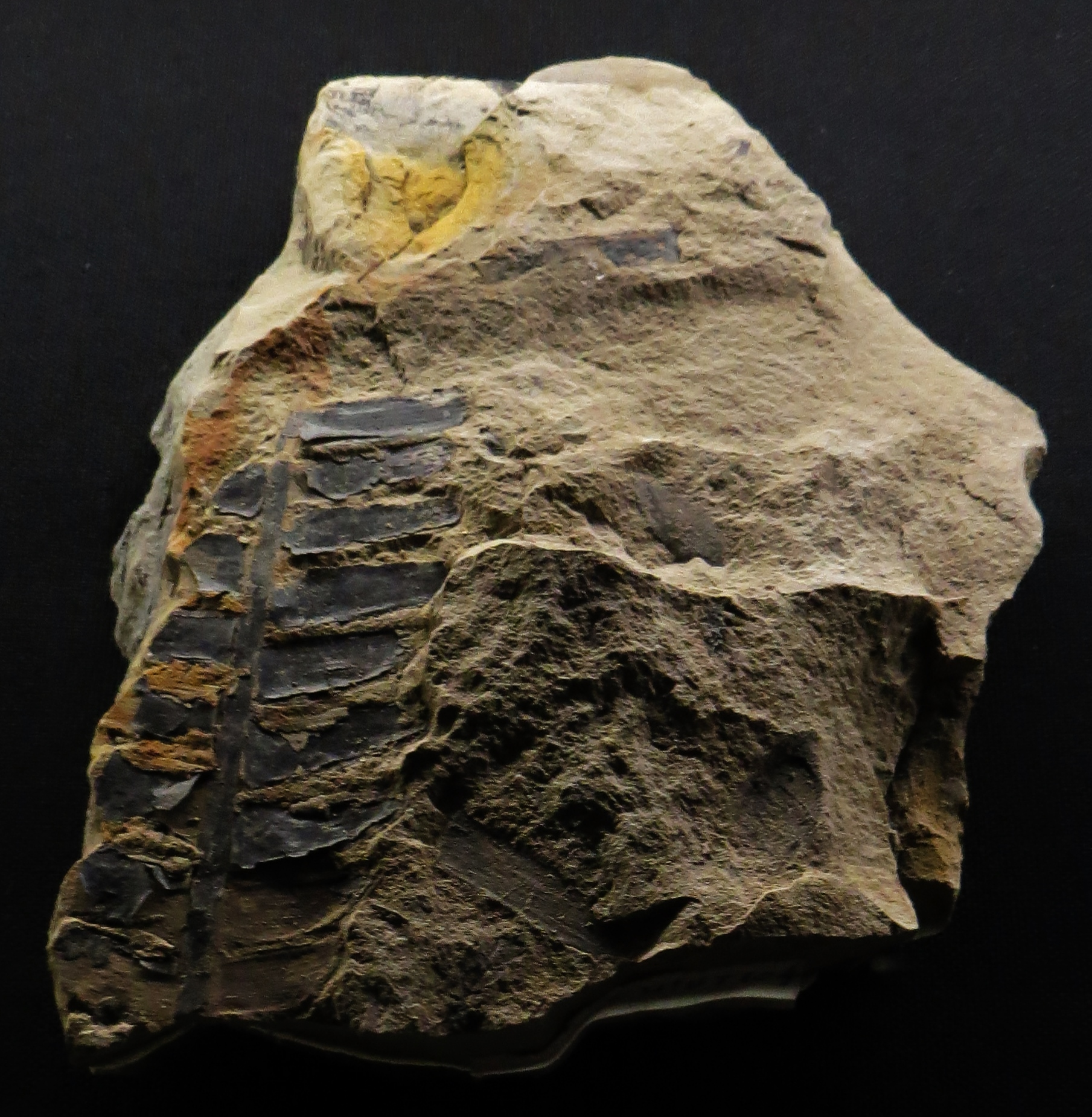
- Fossil of Ptilozamites sandbergeri of Triassic age

Scientific classification
- Kingdom: Plantae
- Clade: Tracheophytes
- Division: †Pteridospermatophyta
- Genus: †Ptilozamites; Nathorst, 1878

= Ptilozamites =

Ptilozamites Temporal range: Late Triassic–Early Jurassic

Extinct genus of ferns

Ptilozamites is an extinct genus of pteridosperm (colloquially known as "seed ferns"), known from the Triassic and Early Jurassic of the Northern Hemisphere. It is associated with the pollen organ Harrisiothecium.

== Taxonomy ==
The genus was first erected by Alfred Gabriel Nathorst in 1878 for remains found in Scania in southern Sweden. Nathorst did not declare a type species While the species Ptilozamites nilssonii was described in the same paper that named the genus, later authors have treated Ptilozamites heeri as the type genus. Recent authors have suggested that the genus Ctenozamites is a synonym of Ptilozamites. Most authors interpret Ptilozamites as an enigmatic "seed fern" (a seed plant, typically with fern-like leaves, of uncertain affinities), though some authors historically suggested that they were related to cycads.

== Description ==
The leaves of Ptilozamites are pinnate (that is, arranged like that of a typical fern, with pairs of parallel leaflets/pinnules projecting from a central axis). The leaves have an odontopteroid venation, and a thick cuticle. The leaves as a whole are typically elongate, with stomata being present either on both sides (amphistomatic) or only on the underside (hypostomatic) of the pinnules, with the stomata being surrounded by a thickened ring of tissue. The leaves of Ptilozamites are often (but not exclusively) forked, like the leaves of the corystosperm seed fern Dicroidium.

=== Whole plant ===
Modern authors have suggested that the pollen-producing organ Harrisiothecium (which has also been referred to at least in part by the genus Hydropterangium) is part of the same plant that produced Ptilozamites leaves. This structure is composed of a central axis which bears branches which terminate with capsules composed of two flap-like valves, which bear pollen sacs on their inner surface. This structure bear similarities to Pteruchus (the pollen organ of corystosperm seed ferns), Antevsia (the pollen organ of the peltasperm Lepidopteris), the enigmatic pollen organs Pteroma, Pramelreuthia and Townrovia, as well as the pollen organs of Bennettitales.

== Distribution and chronology ==
Ptilozamites was widespread across the Northern Hemisphere during the Late Triassic and Early Jurassic, with remains having been reported from Europe, Greenland and China.
