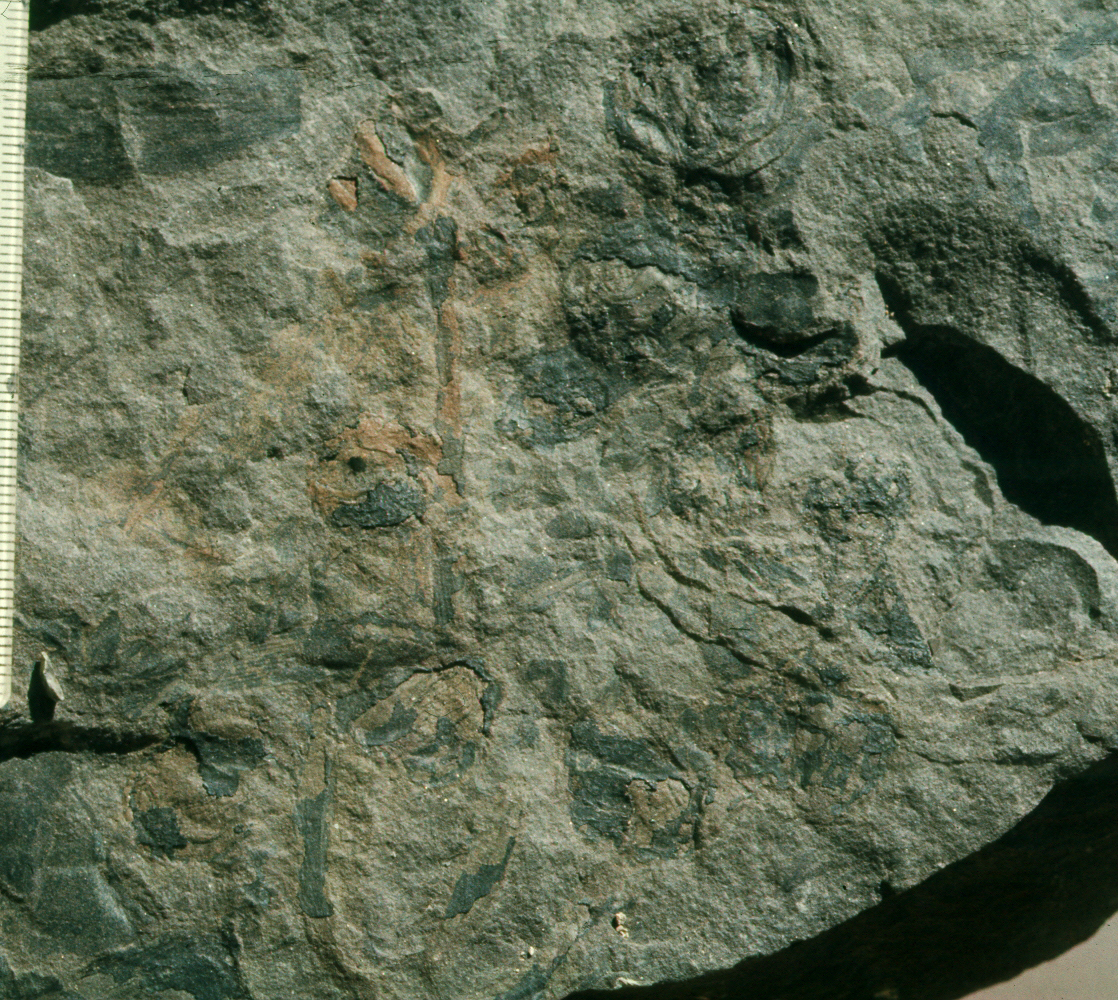
- Umkomasia feistmantelii ovulate structure from the Early Triassic Newport Formation of Turimetta Head, NSW, Australia.

Scientific classification
- Kingdom: Plantae
- Clade: Tracheophytes
- Order: †Corystospermales
- Family: †Corystospermaceae
- Genus: †Umkomasia
- Species: †U. feistmantelii

Binomial name
- †Umkomasia feistmantelii Holmes 1987

= Umkomasia feistmantelii =

Umkomasia feistmantelii Temporal range: Early Triassic

Extinct species of plant

Umkomasia feistmantelii is an unusually large species of Umkomasia from the Early Triassic of New South Wales, Australia.

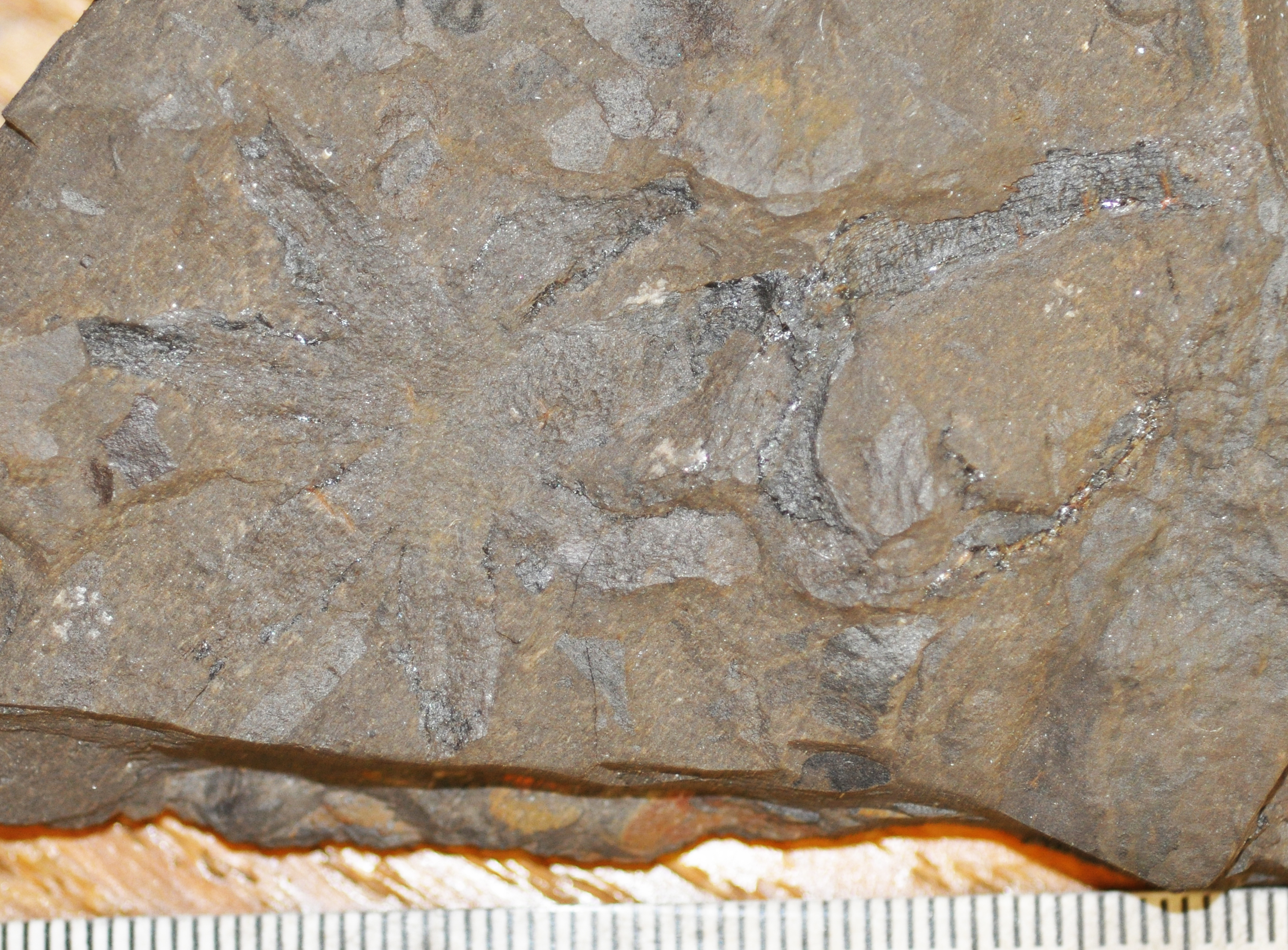
Umkomasia feistmantelii expanded cupule from the Early Triassic Newport Formation of Turimetta Head, NSW, Australia

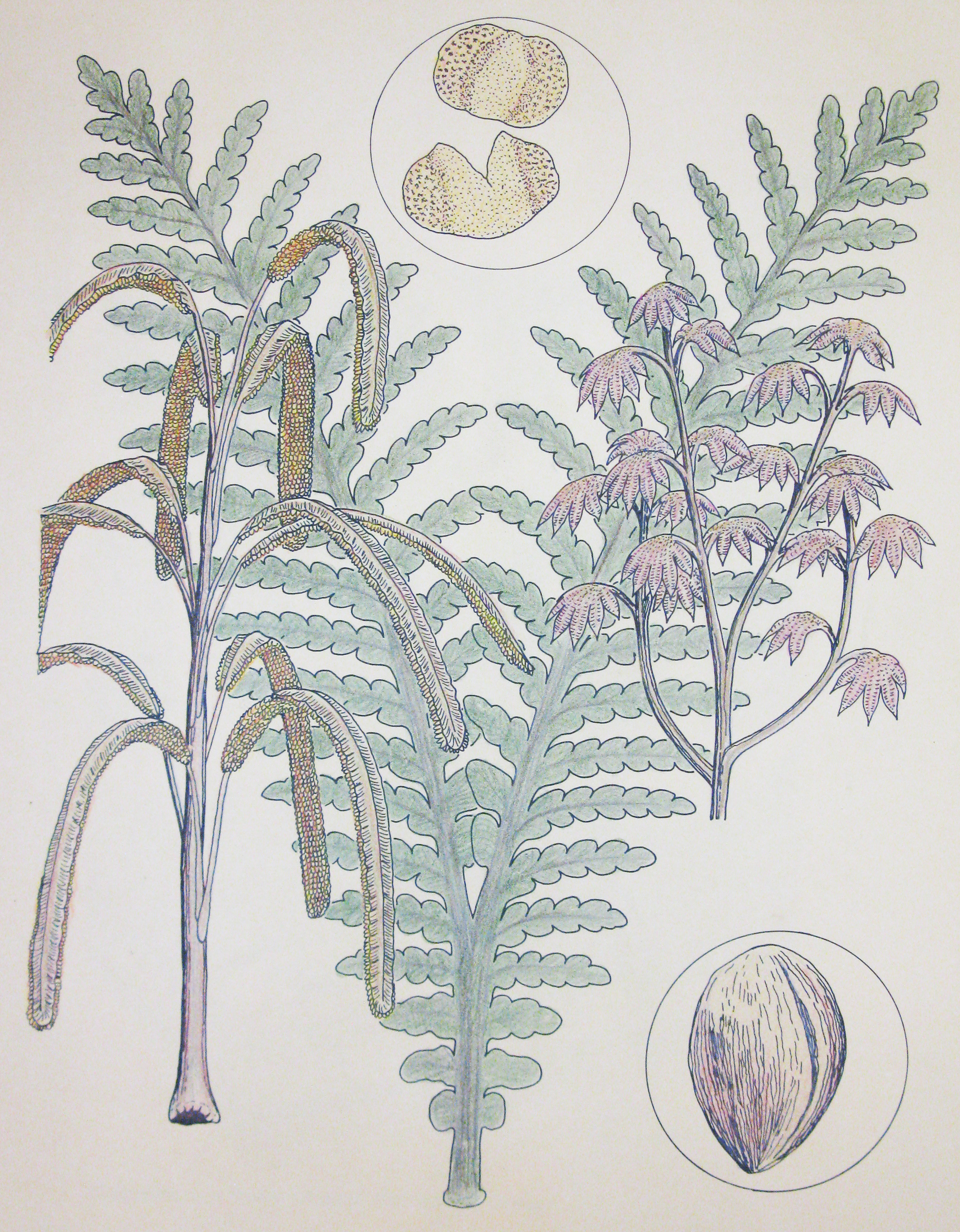
Umkomasia feistmantelii reconstructed plant, Early Triassic Newport Formation, Turimetta Head, New South Wales, Australia

== Description ==
Umkomasia feistmantelii is found both with cupules enclosing the large seeds and with cupules open and expandede into a star-shaped form.

== Whole Plant Reconstruction ==
Umkomasia feistmantelii from the Early Triassic of Australia may have been produced by the same plant as Pteruchus barrealensis (pollen organs) and Dicroidium zuberi (leaves)

== See also ==
- Evolution of plants
