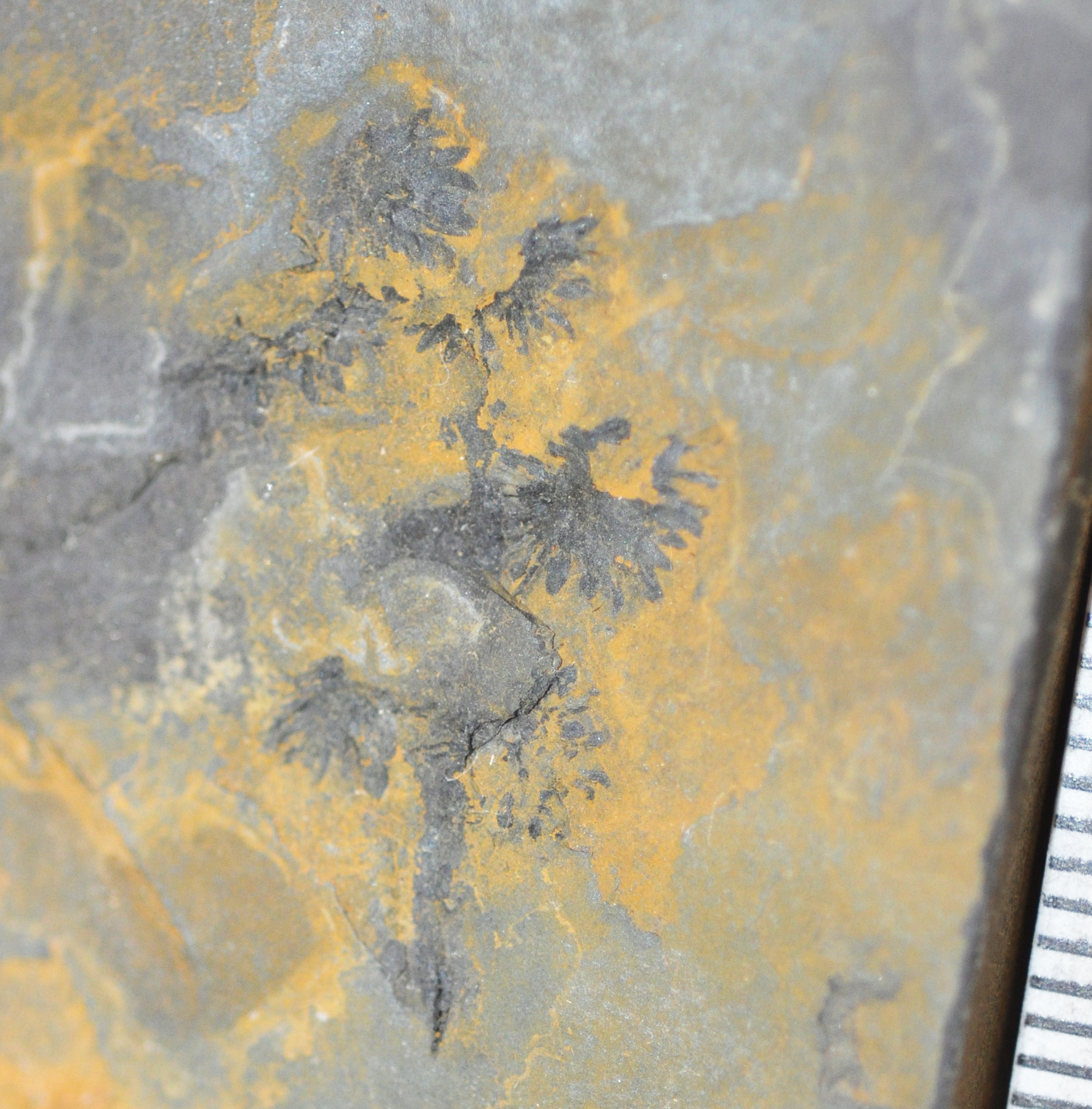
- Pteruchus africanus fossil pollen organ, Late Triassic, Molteno Formation, Umkomaas, South Africa.

Scientific classification
- Kingdom: Plantae
- Clade: Tracheophytes
- Order: †Corystospermales
- Family: †Corystospermaceae
- Genus: †Pteruchus
- Species: †P. africanus

Binomial name
- †Pteruchus africanus Thomas

= Pteruchus africanus =

Pteruchus africanus Temporal range: Triassic

Fossil pollen organ of seed fern

Pteruchus africanus is a pollen organ of a seed fern (Pteridospermatophyta). It was first described by Hamshaw Thomas from the Umkomaas locality of South Africa.

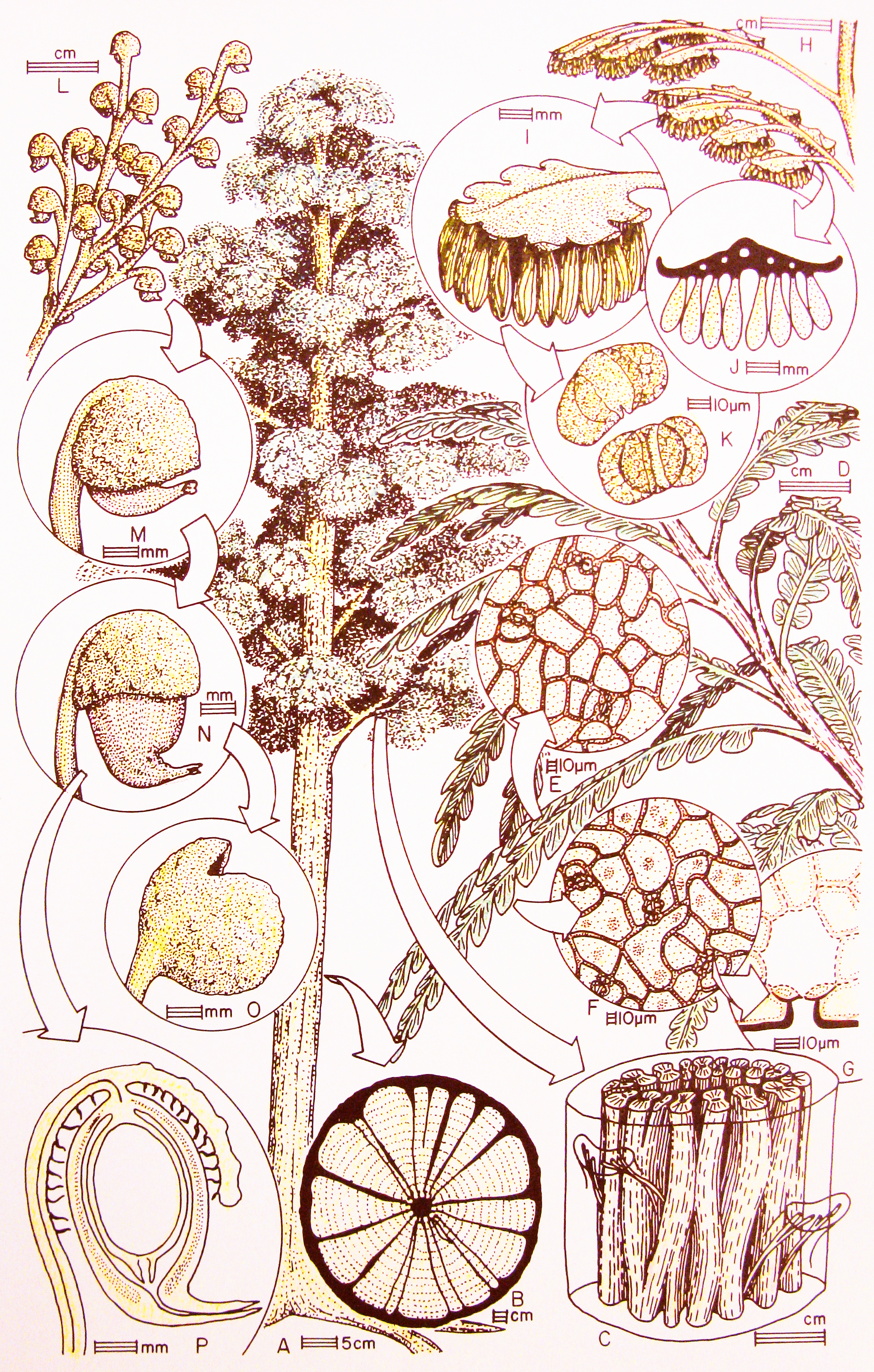
Umkomasia macleani reconstruction of whole plant including leaves (Dicroidium odontopteroides, pollen organs (Pteruchus africanus based largely on material from the Umkomaas locality of South Africa

== Description ==
The pollen organs Pteruchus africanus differ from other species of Pteruchus in small size, and equant blade supporting the pollen sacs.

== Whole plant reconstructions ==
Pteruchus africanus may have been produced by the same plant as Umkomasia macleanii (ovulate organs) and Dicroidium odontopteroides (leaves), based on cuticular similarities between these leaves and reproductive structures at the Umkomaas locality of South Africa.
