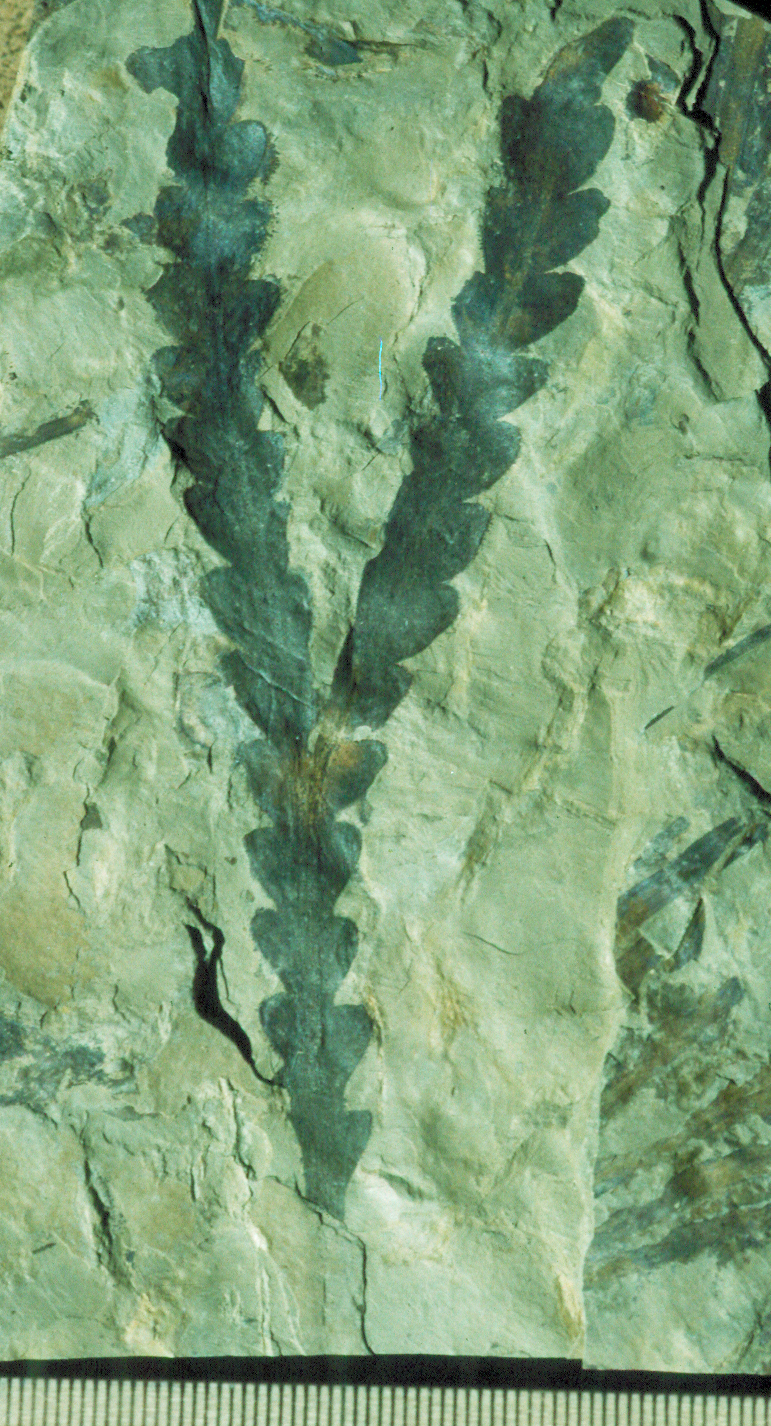
- Dicroidium odontopteroides fossil leaf, Late Triassic Molteno Formation near Birds River South Africa.

Scientific classification
- Kingdom: Plantae
- Clade: Tracheophytes
- Order: †Corystospermales
- Family: †Corystospermaceae
- Genus: †Dicroidium
- Species: †D. odontopteroides

Binomial name
- †Dicroidium odontopteroides (Morris) Gothan

= Dicroidium odontopteroides =

Dicroidium odontopteroides Temporal range: Triassic

Species of ancient plant

Dicroidium odontopteroides was a common and widespread species of Dicroidium known from South Africa, Australia, New Zealand, South America and Antarctica. The species was first discovered in Triassic sediments of Tasmania and described by the palaeontologist John Morris in 1845.

== Description ==
The leaves of Dicroidium odontopteroides differ from other species of Dicroidium in being unipinnate and having short rounded pinnae.

== Whole plant reconstructions ==
Dicroidium odontopteroides may have been produced by the same plant as Umkomasia macleanii (ovulate structures) and Pteruchus africanus (pollen organs), based on cuticular similarities between these leaves and reproductive structures at the Umkomaas locality of South Africa.
