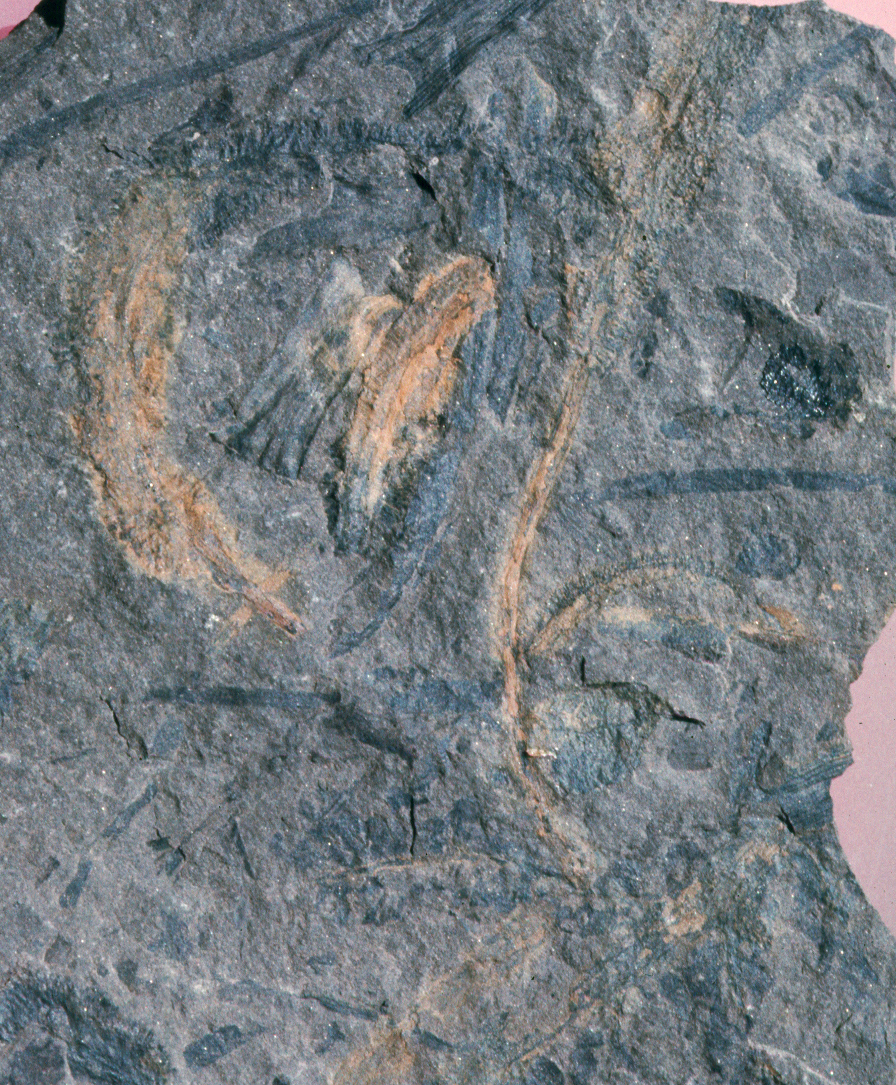
- Pteruchus barrelensis pollen organ from the Early Triassic Newport Formation of Turimetta Head, NSW, Australia.

Scientific classification
- Kingdom: Plantae
- Clade: Tracheophytes
- Order: †Corystospermales
- Family: †Corystospermaceae
- Genus: †Pteruchus
- Species: †P. barrealensis

Binomial name
- †Pteruchus barrealensis Holmes and Ash 1979

= Pteruchus barrealensis =

Pteruchus barrealensis Temporal range: Early Triassic

Extinct species of flowering plant

Pteruchus barrealensis is an unusually large species of Pteruchus with very elongate polleniferous heads from Early Triassic of Australia and Argentina.

== Description ==
Pteruchus barrealensis is one of the geologically earliest species of Pteruchus, and has very elongate polleniferous heads.

== Whole plant reconstruction ==
Pteruchus barrealensis from the Early Triassic of Australia may have been produced by the same plant as Umkomasia feistmantelii (ovulate organs) and Dicroidium zuberi (leaves)
