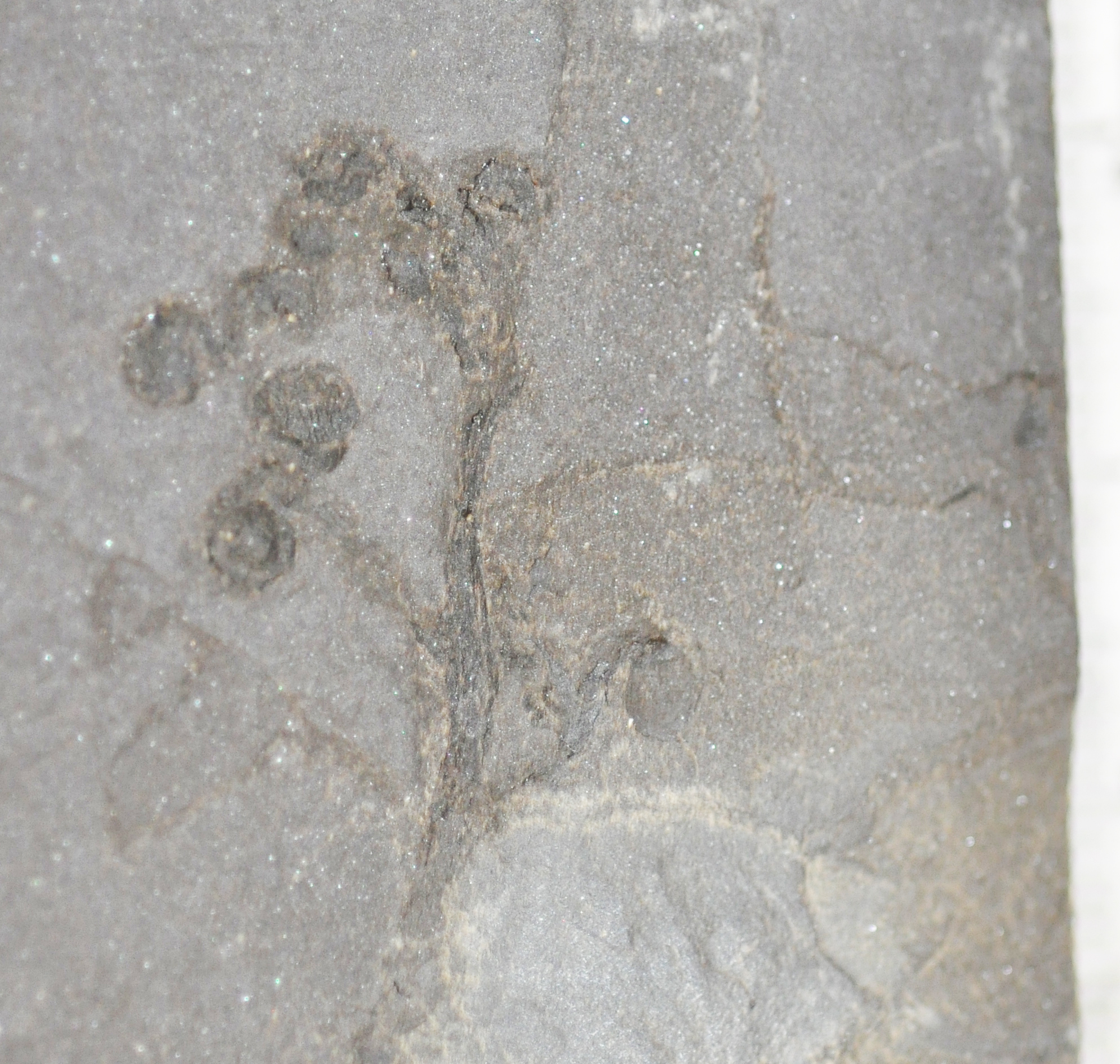
- Umkomasia macleanii fossil ovulate structure, Late Triassic, Molteno Formation, Umkomaas, South Africa.

Scientific classification
- Kingdom: Plantae
- Clade: Tracheophytes
- Order: †Corystospermales
- Family: †Corystospermaceae
- Genus: †Umkomasia
- Species: †U. macleanii

Binomial name
- †Umkomasia macleanii Thomas

= Umkomasia macleanii =

Umkomasia macleanii Temporal range: Triassic

Fossil part of seed fern

Umkomasia macleanii is an ovulate structure of a seed fern (Pteridospermatophyta and the nominate genus of Family Umkomasiaceae. It was first described by Hamshaw Thomas from the Umkomaas locality of South Africa.

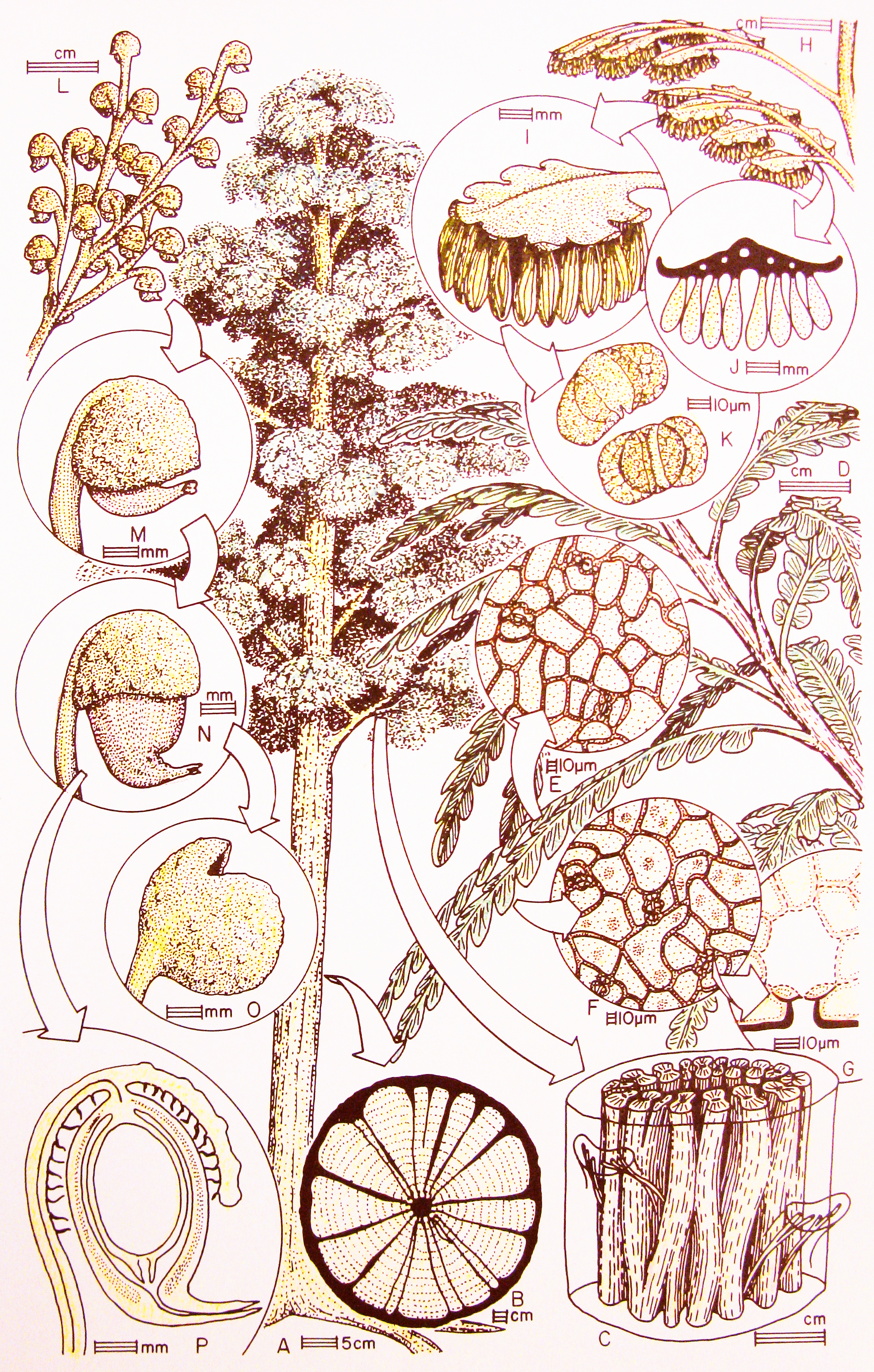
Umkomasia macleani reconstruction of whole plant including leaves (Dicroidium odontopteroides, pollen organs (Pteruchus africanus based largely on material from the Umkomaas locality of South Africa

== Description ==
The ovulate structures of Umkomasia macleanii differ from other species of Umkomasia in small size, and limited geographic distribution.

== Whole plant reconstructions ==
Umkomasia macleanii may have been produced by the same plant as Pteruchus africanus (pollen organs) and Dicroidium odontopteroides (leaves), based on cuticular similarities between these leaves and reproductive structures at the Umkomaas locality of South Africa.
