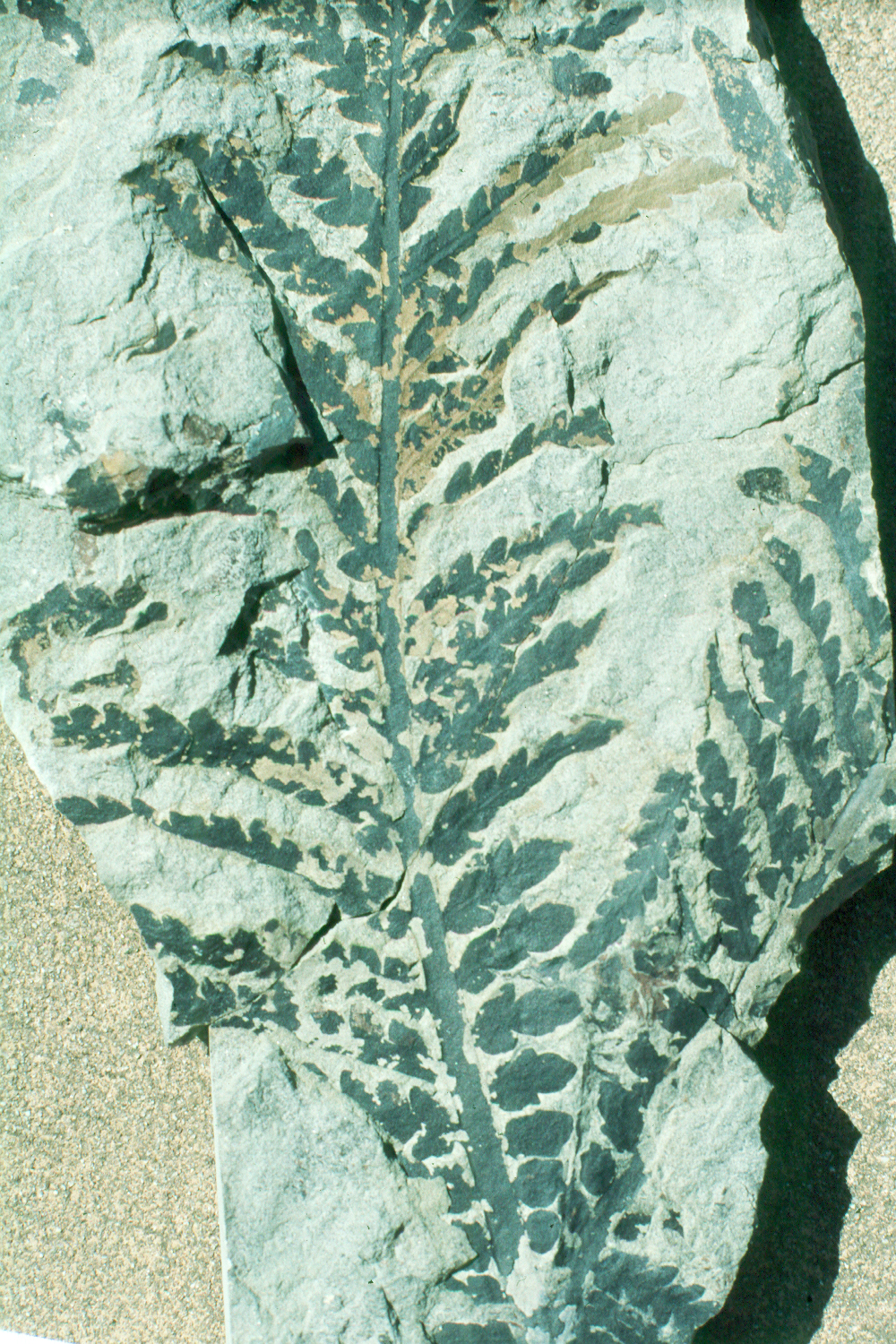
- Dicroidium zuberi leaf from the Early Triassic Gosford Formation of Terrigal, NSW, Australia.

Scientific classification
- Kingdom: Plantae
- Clade: Tracheophytes
- Order: †Corystospermales
- Family: †Corystospermaceae
- Genus: †Dicroidium
- Species: †D. zuberi

Binomial name
- †Dicroidium zuberi Holmes and Ash 1979

= Dicroidium zuberi =

Dicroidium zuberi Temporal range: Early Triassic–Late Triassic

Species of seed fern

Dicroidium zuberi is a large bipinnate species of the seed fern Dicroidium with a forked rachis. The leaves are affiliated with Umkomasia feistmantellii megasporophylls and Petruchus barrealensis microsporophylls.

D. zuberi was a common species in the coeval vegetation of the Sydney and Lorne Basins of New South Wales. Specimens have been found near Wairaki Hut and indicate that this species may have been as common in Scytho-Anisian vegetation of coastal New Zealand. In younger rocks younger than the late Anisian, they are outnumbered by unipinnate Dicroidium leaves such as those belonging to D. odontopteroides.

== Description ==
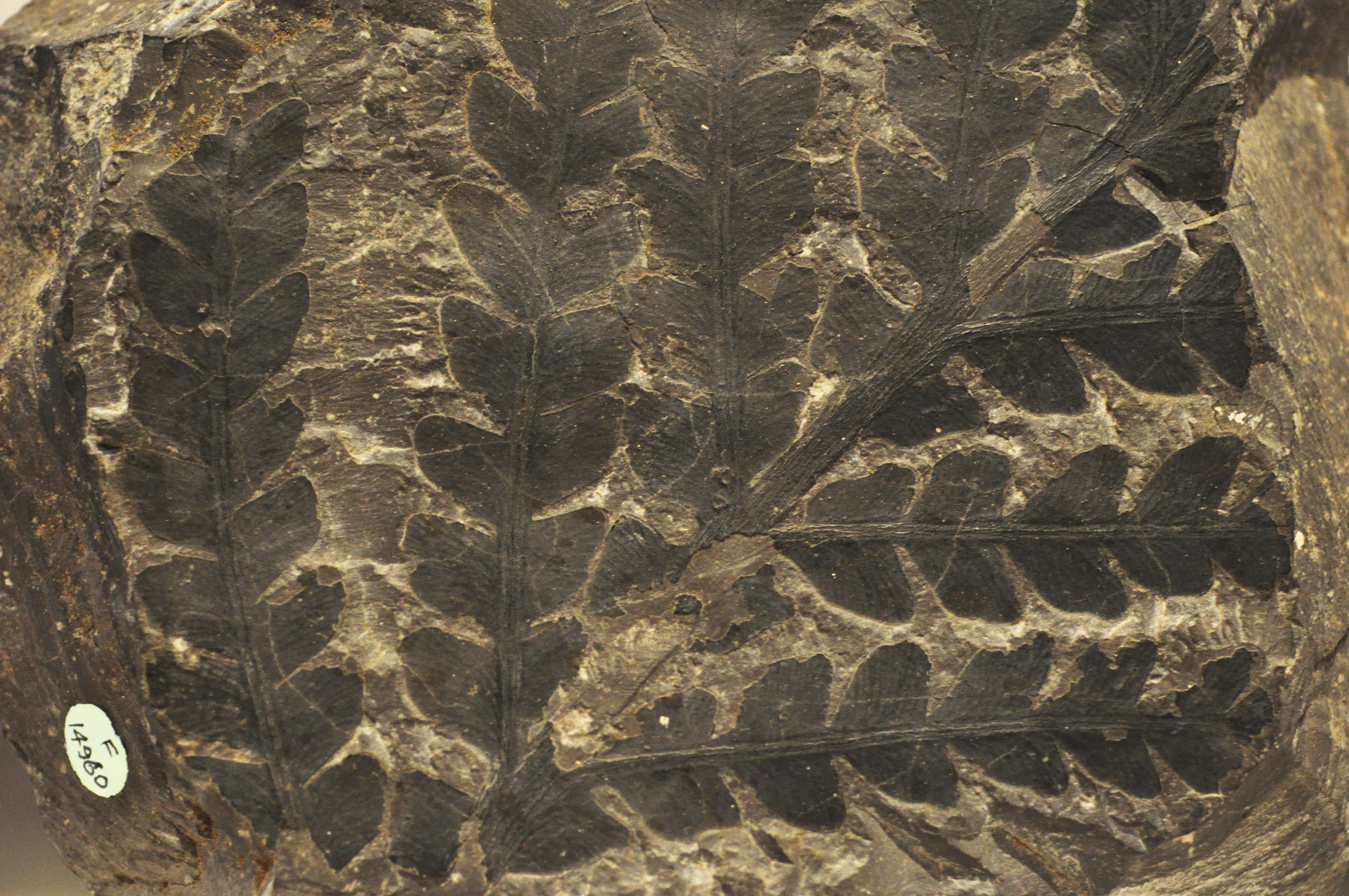
Leaf of Dicroidium zuberi from Brokvale, NSW in Hawkesbury Sandstone, Early Triassic. Specimen in Australian Museum, Sydney

Dicroidium zuberi had large, bipinnate, thick and leathery leaves. The leaves were up to 21 cm long. The rachis is proximately forked once with opposite or sub-opposite pinnae that is imparipinnate. The largest pinnae found measure 8 cm long and 3 cm wide. The pinna rachis are between 2 and 5 cm wide with a distinct median ridge. The individual pinnules were closely spaced and frequently overlapping. The pinnules were rhomboidal or broadly oval, and usually slightly contracted at the base with entire or slightly lobed margins and an obtuse apex. The terminal pinnule of each frond was oval or oblong in shape.

The stomatal frequency on both sides of the frond were similar, with irregularly oriented stomata evenly distributed over the entire surface of the leaves. Each of the stomata had typically 5 but sometimes 4 or 6 subsidiary cells that were rarely papillate and rarely in close contact with one another. The thinly cutinised guard cells were slightly sunken into the surface of the frond, appearing as an apature-like slit in a rectangular stomatal pit that was thickly cutinised on the lateral sides, with no encircling cells present.

== Location ==
D. zuberi is found in the southern hemisphere, from Australia, South Africa, India, and Argentina. It is the most consistently occurring species in the Triassic succession of Peninsular India, found in the Panchet Formation, Ramkola–Tatapani Coalfied, Balrampur District, Chhattisgarh, Tiki and Parsora formations, South Rewa Gondwana Basin and Pathargarh beds of Kamthi Formation, Mahanadi Valley Basin.

== Taxonomy ==
After 1967, D. zuberi now unites four species previously categorized in the genus Zuberia, namely Z. sahnii, Z. barrealensis, Z. zuberi, and Z. feistmanteli. This combination was suggested by Sergio Archangelsky due to the lack of differences in size, shape, and venation of pinnules. These four species were described by Frenguelli in 1943 and 1944, and were originally united as a single species in the genus Dicroidium as D. feistmanteli by Bonetti in 1966.

== Neotype ==
The original type specimen of Zuberia zuberi was described by Szajnocha as Cardiopteris zuberi and under Archangelsky's combination of four Zuberia species should be the holotype for D. zuberi. However, a neotype (LP 9520) was selected by Archangelsky as he did not know where the holotype was located when he described D. zuberi.
