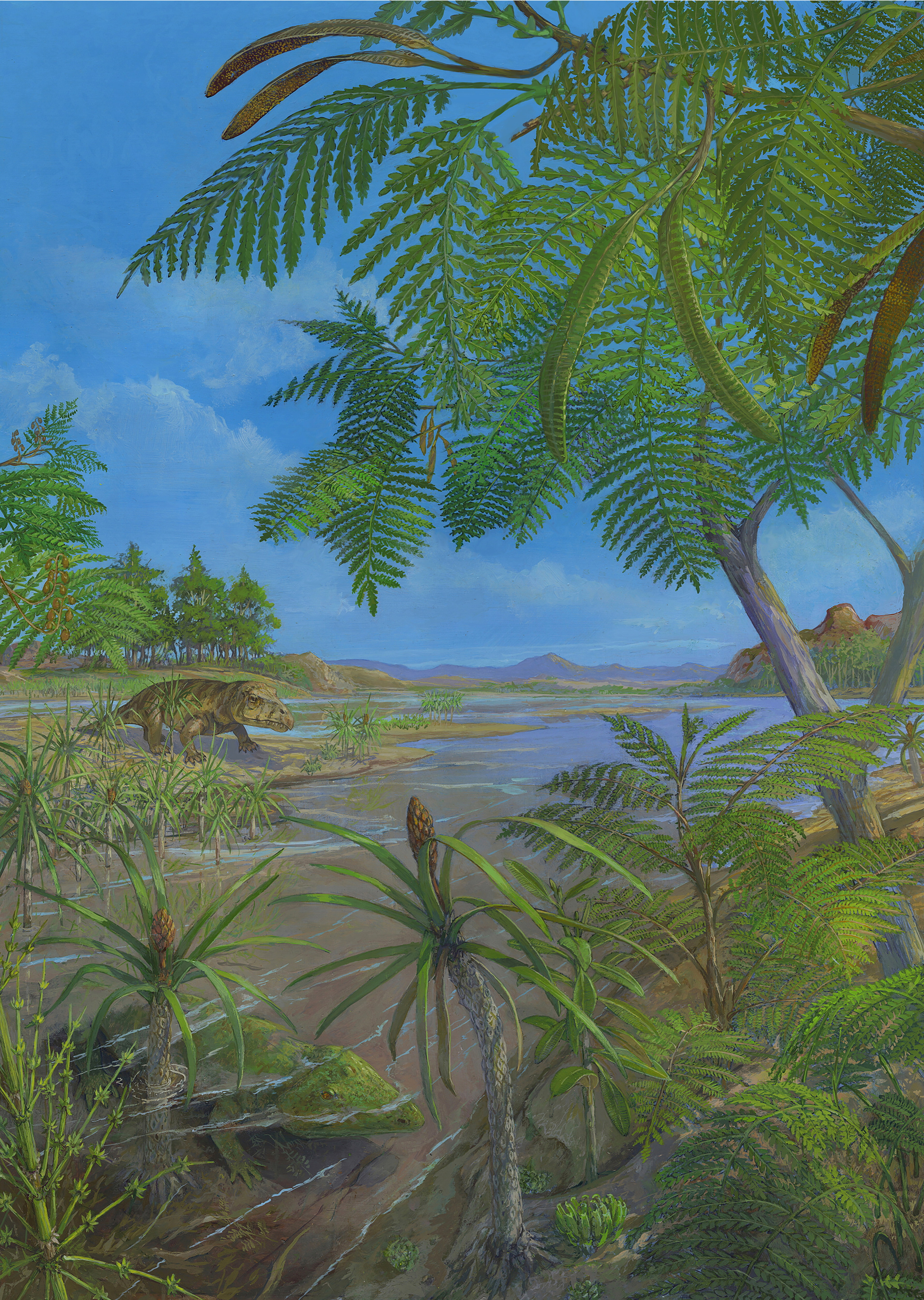
- Reconstruction of the Dicroidium plant (top right) in an Early Triassic Australian landscape. Art by Michael Rothman

Scientific classification
- Kingdom: Plantae
- Clade: Tracheophytes
- Clade: Spermatophytes
- Order: †Corystospermales; Petriella, 1981
- Family: †Corystospermaceae; Thomas, 1933

Genera
- See text

Synonyms
- Ptilozamitaceae Němejc, 1950; Umkomasiaceae Petriella, 1981; Zuberiaceae Němejc, 1968

= Corystospermaceae =

Corystospermaceae Temporal range: Late Permian–Early Jurassic

Extinct family of seed ferns

Corystosperms are a group of extinct seed plants (often referred to as "seed ferns") belonging to the family Corystospermaceae (also called Umkomasiaceae) assigned to the order Corystospermales or Umkomasiales. They were first described based on fossils collected by Hamshaw Thomas from the Burnera Waterfall locality near the Umkomaas River of South Africa. Corystosperms are typified by a group of plants that bore forked Dicroidium leaves, Umkomasia cupulate ovulate structures and Pteruchus pollen organs, which grew as trees that were widespread over Gondwana during the Middle and Late Triassic. Other fossil Mesozoic seed plants with similar leaf and/or reproductive structures have also sometimes been included within the "corystosperm" concept sensu lato, such as the "doyleoids" from the Early Cretaceous of North America and Asia. A potential corystosperm sensu lato, the leaf genus Komlopteris, is known from the Eocene of Tasmania, around 53-50 million years old, over 10 million years after the Cretaceous–Paleogene extinction event.

== Description ==
Classic Umkomasiaceae have helmet-like cupules around ovules born in complex large branching structures (Umkomasia). The pollen organ (Pteruchus) has numerous cigar-shaped pollen sacs hanging from epaulette-like blades, again in complex branching structures.

The architecture and size of Dicroidium leaves is highly variable, going from simple to tripinnate, to needle-like to lobed or dissected leaflets, however, all leaves are united by being bifurcated at the base.

The Dicroidium plant (which bore Dicroidium leaves, Umkomasia seed bearing structures and Pteruchus pollen organs) is thought to have grown as large trees, with trunks at least 10 metres (33 ft) tall and over 50 centimetres (20 in) wide. Some other possible corystosperms like Pachypteris may have grown as shrubs or Mangroves. While the +70 cm Dichopteris may have grown convergently with the extant Nypa fruticans.

== Evolutionary history ==
The oldest fossils of corystosperms, belonging to Dicroidium, Pteruchus and Umkomasia date to the Late Permian in the low-latitudes of eastern Gondwana, including the Umm Irna Formation of Jordan, as well as the Indian subcontinent, though possible pollen belonging to the group is also known from the Late Permian of South Africa. During the Middle-Late Triassic, Dicroidium bearing corystosperms were widespread and dominant trees over temperate areas of southern Gondwana (including the Indian subcontinent, South America, Southern Africa, Antarctica, Australia and New Zealand) including wetland and forest environments, where they formed part of the canopy vegetation. Dicroidium-bearing corystosperm ecosystems collapsed as a result of the end-Triassic extinction event. Late surviving Dicroidium-bearing corystosperms are known from the Early Jurassic (Sinemurian) of East Antarctica. During the Jurassic, the possible corystosperms Pachypteris and Komlopteris were widespread over both hemispheres, with Komlopteris surviving in the Southern Hemisphere through the Cretaceous and into the early Eocene in Tasmania, making it the last surviving "seed fern" in the fossil record. A group of plants with corystosperm-like reproductive structures, either considered corystosperms or as belonging to the separate order Doyleales, were present in North America and Asia during the Early Cretaceous, with records of the group possibly extending back as far as the Early Jurassic.

== List of genera ==
- Umkomasia ovulate structures
- Pteruchus pollen organs
- Ctenozamites? leaves
- Cycadopteris? leaves
- Dichopteris? leaves
- Dicroidium leaves
- Johnstonia leaves
- Komlopteris? leaves
- Kurtziana? leaves
- Pachypteris? leaves
- Ptilozamites? leaves
- Raphidopteris? leaves
- Xylopteris leaves
- Antarcticoxylon wood
- Kyklyxylon wood
- Rhexoxylon wood
- "Doyleoids" (sometimes included)
  - Doylea ovulate structures
  - Jarudia ovulate structures
  - Tevshiingovia ovulate structures
  - Zirabia ovulate structures

== Relationships to other seed plants ==
The relationships of corystosperms to other seed plants are contentious. It has been suggested that some "peltasperms" may be closely related to corystosperms. A 2016 paper suggested that they may be closely related to Ginkgoales, while a 2021 study suggested that based on the structure of their ovulate organs, corystosperms might form part of the "Anthophyte" clade more closely related to flowering plants than to living gymnosperms, alongside the Petriellales, Caytoniales, and glossopterids.

== Nomenclature ==
Corystospermaceae is a family name which was not derived from a specific genus, an arrangement which is discouraged by the ICN. In light of this issue, Petriella (1981) proposed two solutions: either retain Corystospermaceae as a nomen conservandum, or replace it with a new name, Umkomasiaceae. Both names have been used frequently since then. Petriella additionally named a new order to encompass the family, Corystospermales. Doweld (2001) preferred a different name for the order, Umkomasiales. He also added a second family, Angaropeltidaceae (previously known as Cardiolepidaceae). Later sources generally classify Angaropeltidaceae (or its updated spelling, Angaropeltaceae) within Peltaspermales instead.

== Gallery ==
(All examples from the Late Triassic Molteno Formation of South Africa)

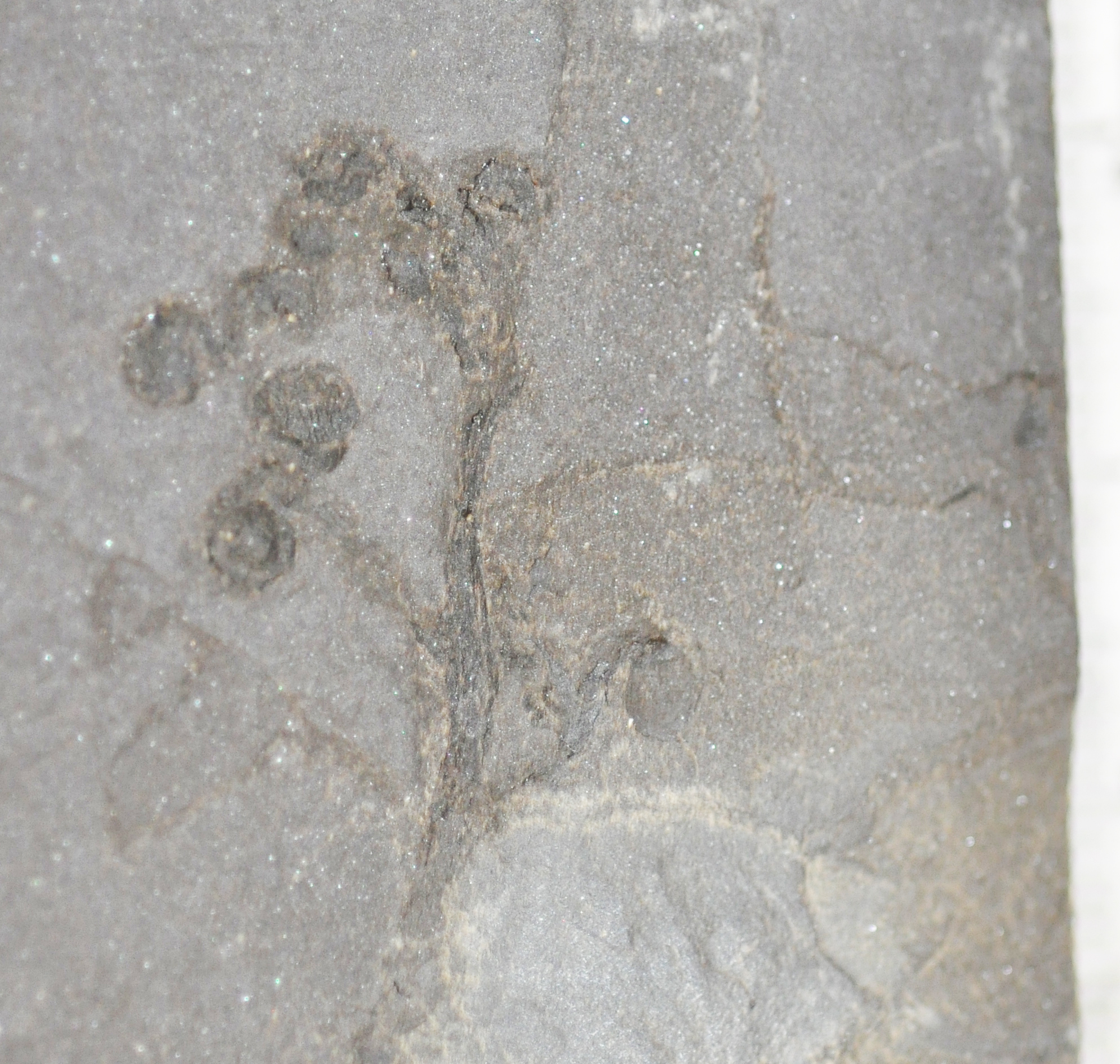
Umkomasia macleanii ovulate structure from Umkomaas

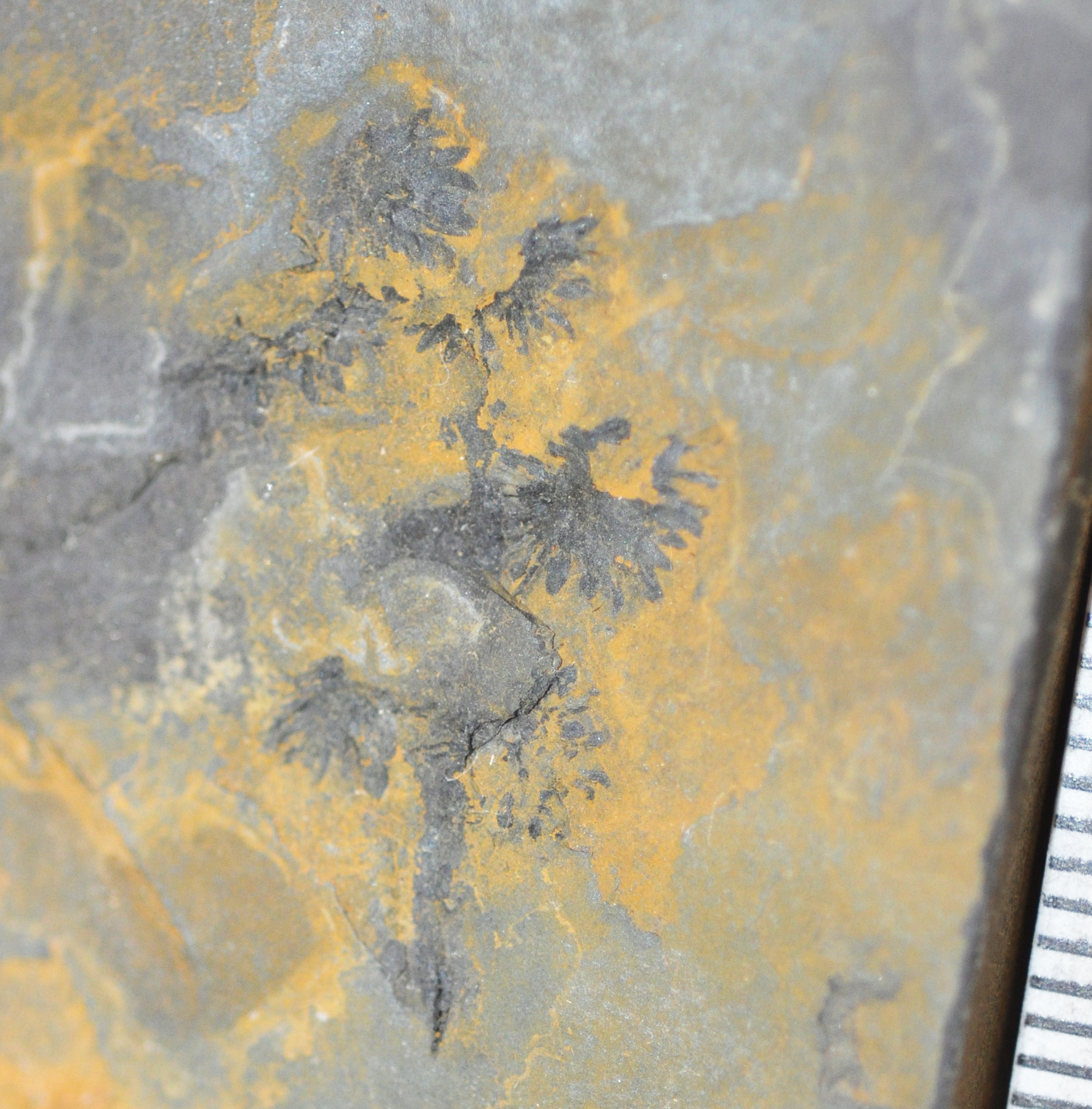
Pteruchus africanus pollen structure from Umkomaas

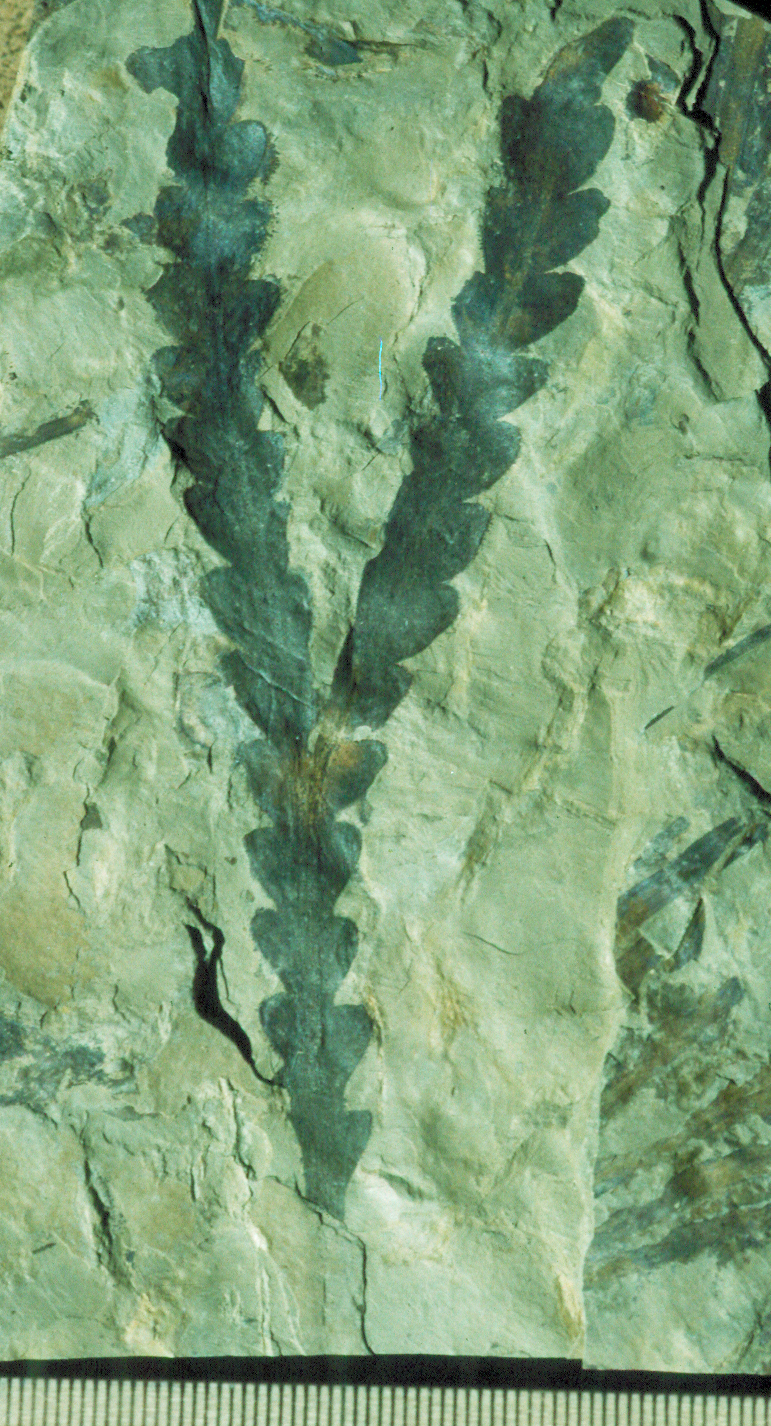
Dicroidium odontopteroides leaf from Birds River

== See also ==
- Evolution of plants
