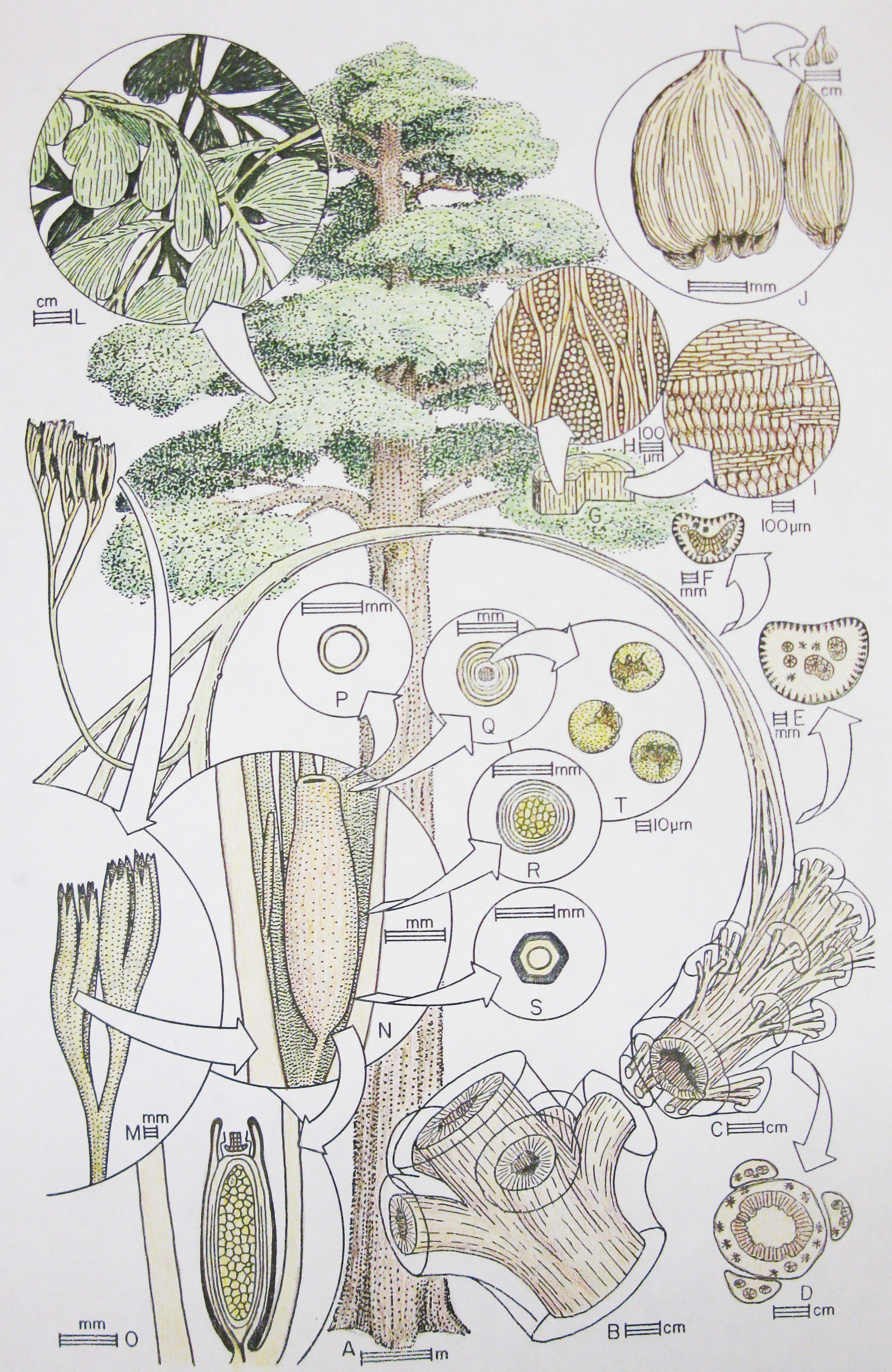
- A reconstruction of Stamnostoma huttonense from the Early Carboniferous Cementstone Group at Foulden Newton, Berwickshire, Scotland

Scientific classification
- Kingdom: Plantae
- Clade: Tracheophytes
- Division: †Pteridospermatophyta
- Class: †Lyginopteridopsida
- Order: †Lyginopteridales
- Family: †Moresnetiaceae
- Genus: †Stamnostoma; Long 1960

Species
- Stamnostoma huttonense

= Stamnostoma =

Stamnostoma Temporal range: Early Carboniferous

Extinct genus of seed ferns

Stamnostoma is an extinct genus of seed ferns based on cupules with seeds. These are among the earliest known seed plants and of earliest Carboniferous (Tournaisian) age.

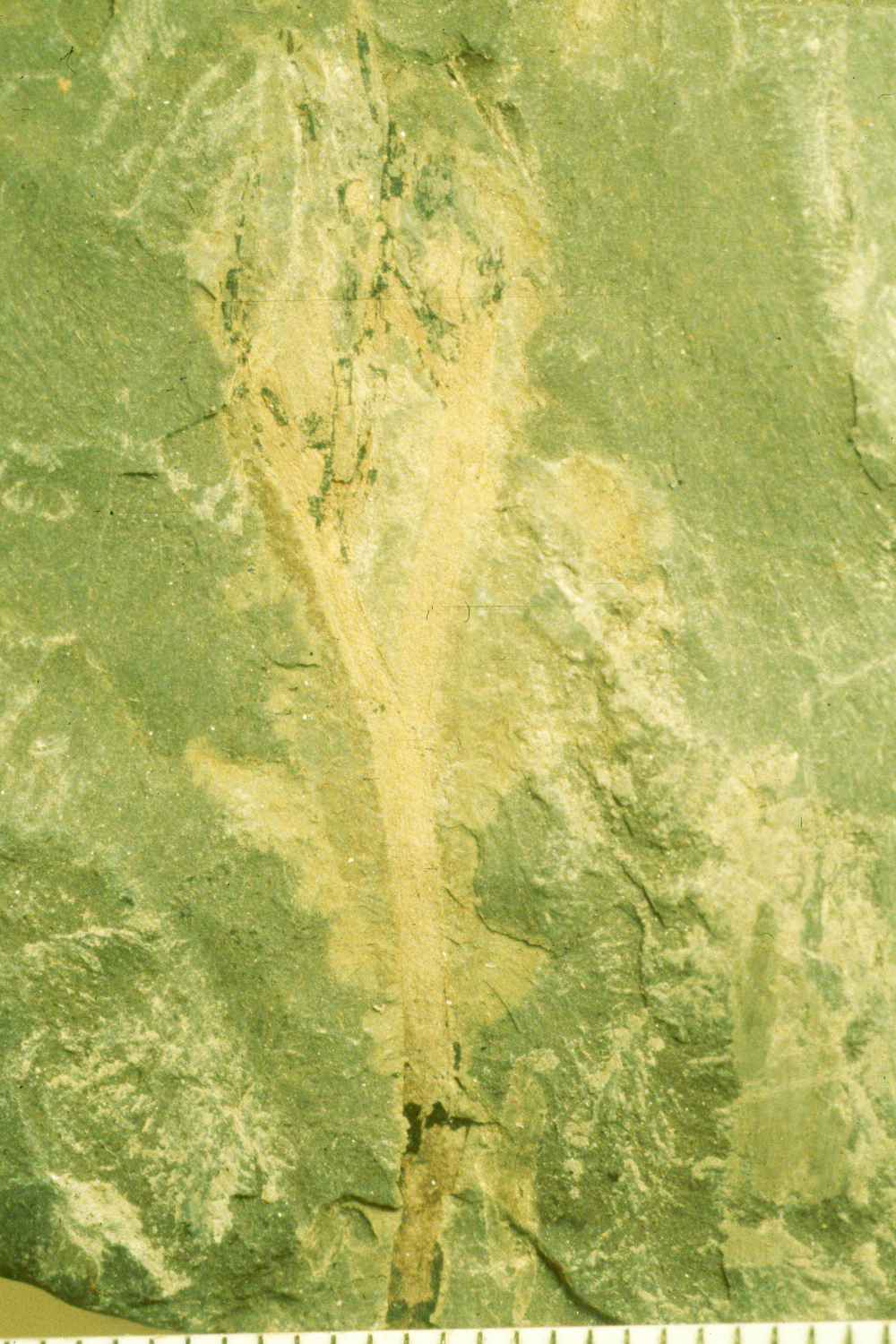
Cupule of Stamnostoma huttonense from the Early Carboniferous Cementstone Group at Newton Foulden, Berwickshire

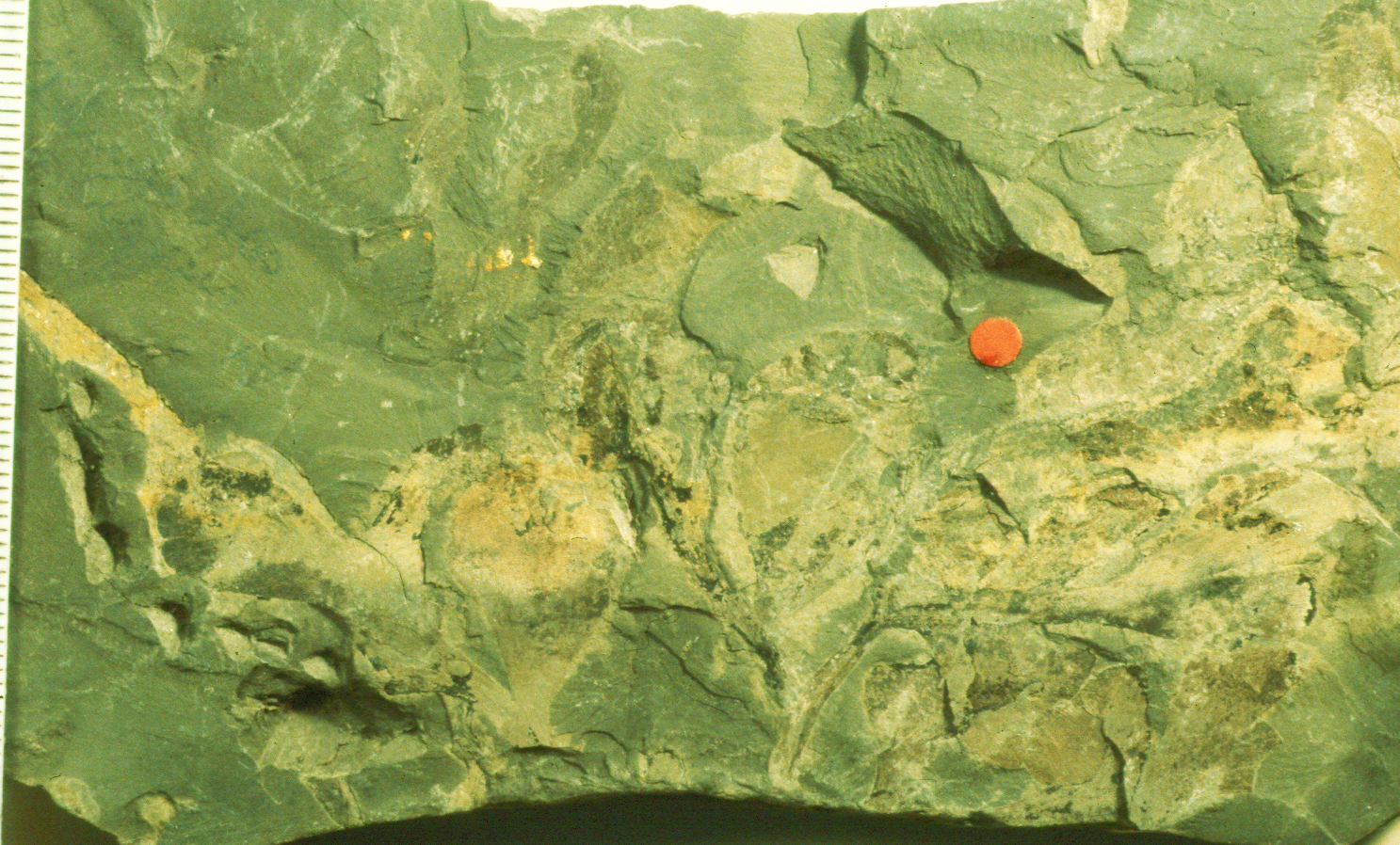
Fossil foliage Aneimites acadica from the Early Carboniferous Cementstone Group at Newton Foulden, Berwickshire

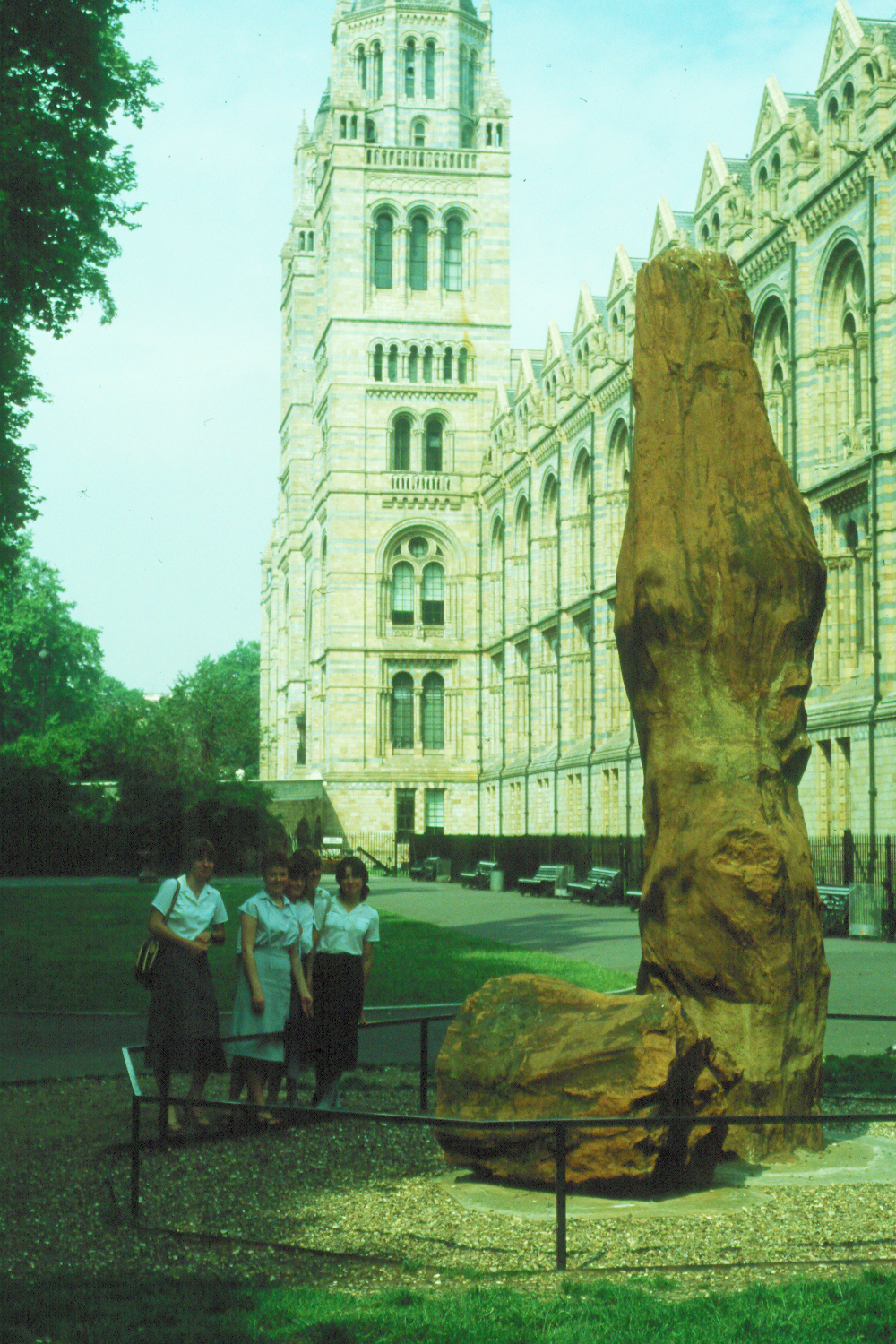
The Craiglieth tree, Pitus primaeva outside the Natural History Museum, London

== Description ==
The ovules of Stamnostoma have a complex apex with plug and cone mechanism for creating a chamber for prepollen, as in other Lyginopteridales. Several ovules are borne on an elongate open cupule of bracts.

== Whole plant reconstructions ==
Different organs attributed to the same original plant can be reconstructed from co-occurrence at the same localities in the Scottish Borders county of Berwickshire.

- Stamnostoma huttonense may have been produced by the same plant as Telangium (prepollen organ), Colatisporites decorus (prepollen), Lyginorachis papilio (permineralized petioles), Aneimites acadica (leaves), and Pitus primaeva (permineralized wood).
