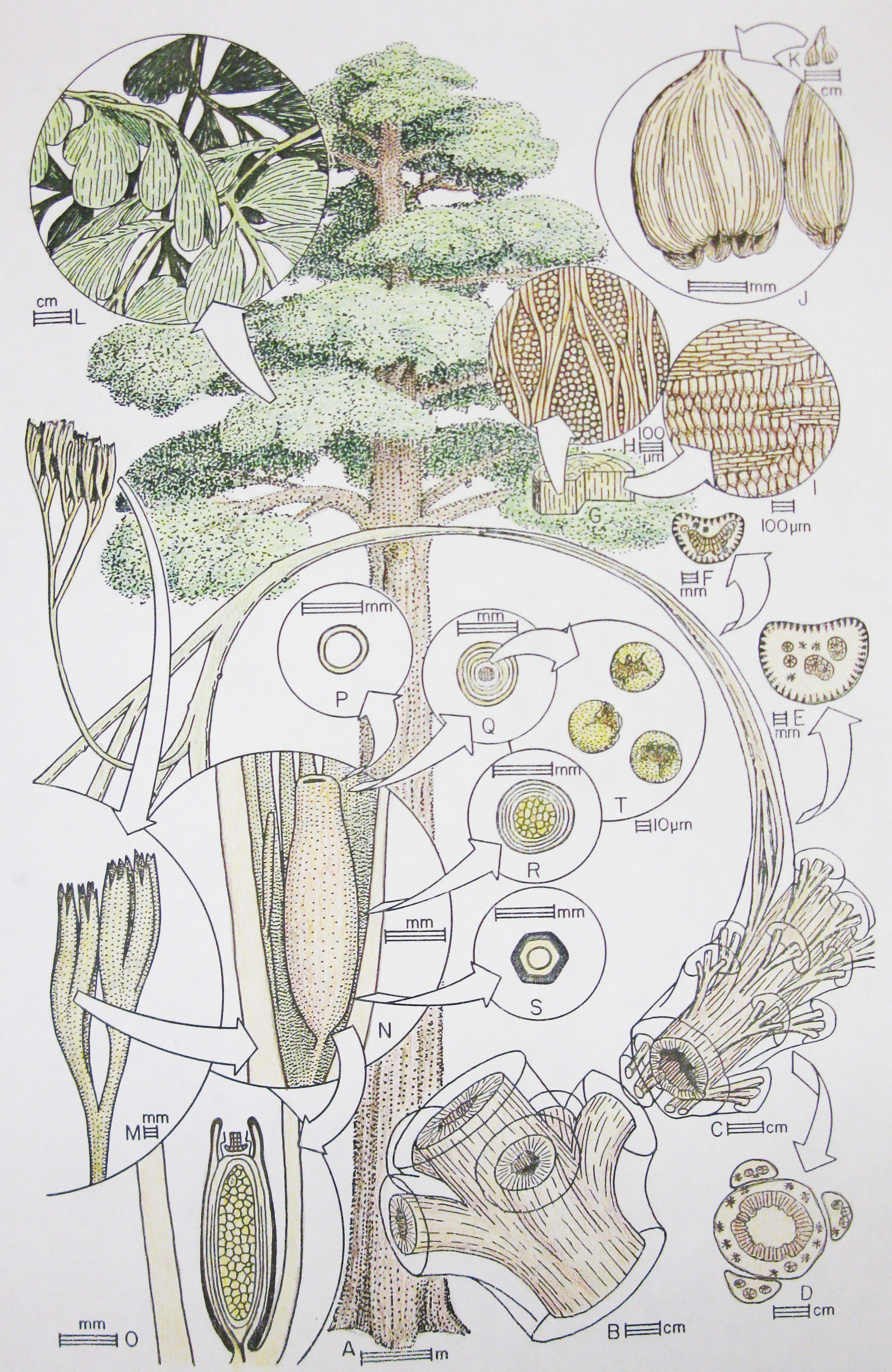
- A reconstruction of Stamnostoma huttonense from the Early Carboniferous Cementstone Group at Foulden Newton, Berwickshire, Scotland

Scientific classification
- Kingdom: Plantae
- Clade: Tracheophytes
- Division: †Pteridospermatophyta
- Class: †Lyginopteridopsida
- Order: †Lyginopteridales
- Family: †Moresnetiaceae

Genera
- Elkinsia ovulate cupule; Calathospermum ovulate cupule; Stamnostoma ovulate cupule; Archaeosperma ovulate cupule; Kerryia ovulate cupule; Pullaritheca ovulate cupule; Salpingostoma ovule; Hydrasperma ovule; Diplopteridium leaves

= Moresnetiaceae =

Moresnetiaceae Temporal range: Devonian–Carboniferous

Extinct family of seed ferns

Moresnetiaceae is a natural family of seed ferns in the Division Pteridospermatophyta that appears in the North American and European Devonian to Carboniferous coal measures.

== Description ==
Moresnetiaceae were shrubs to trees with radiospermic ovules with a lagenostome and aggregated into multiovular cupules.
