= Combresomyces =

Combresomyces Temporal range: Upper Carboniferous–Triassic

Scientific classification
- Domain: Eukaryota
- Clade: Sar
- Clade: Stramenopiles
- Division: Oomycota
- Class: incertae sedis
- Genus: †Combresomyces; Dotzler, M. Krings, Agerer, Galtier & T.N. Taylor, 2008

Species
- C. cornifer Dotzler, M. Krings, Agerer, Galtier & T.N. Taylor, 2008; C. williamsonii Strullu-Derrien et al., 2011

Extinct genus of single-celled organisms

Combresomyces is a genus of hyphal, parasitic oomycete known from the fossil record; it infects organisms such as the seed fern Lyginopteris.
