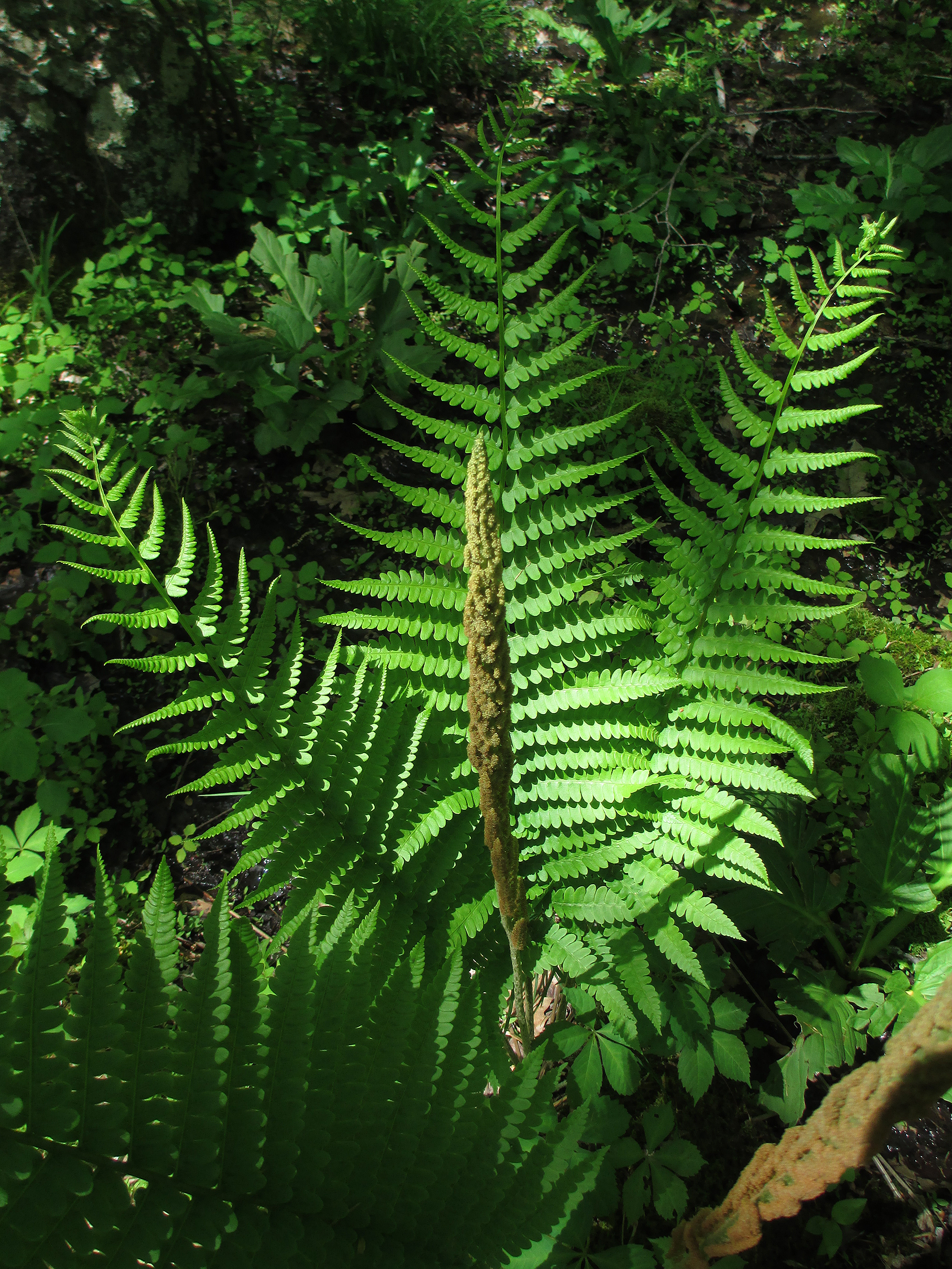
- Developing spore-bearing frond and several sterile fronds in late spring

Conservation status
- Secure (NatureServe)

Scientific classification
- Kingdom: Plantae
- Clade: Tracheophytes
- Division: Polypodiophyta
- Class: Polypodiopsida
- Order: Osmundales
- Family: Osmundaceae
- Genus: Osmundastrum
- Species: O. cinnamomeum

Binomial name
- Osmundastrum cinnamomeum (L.) C.Presl
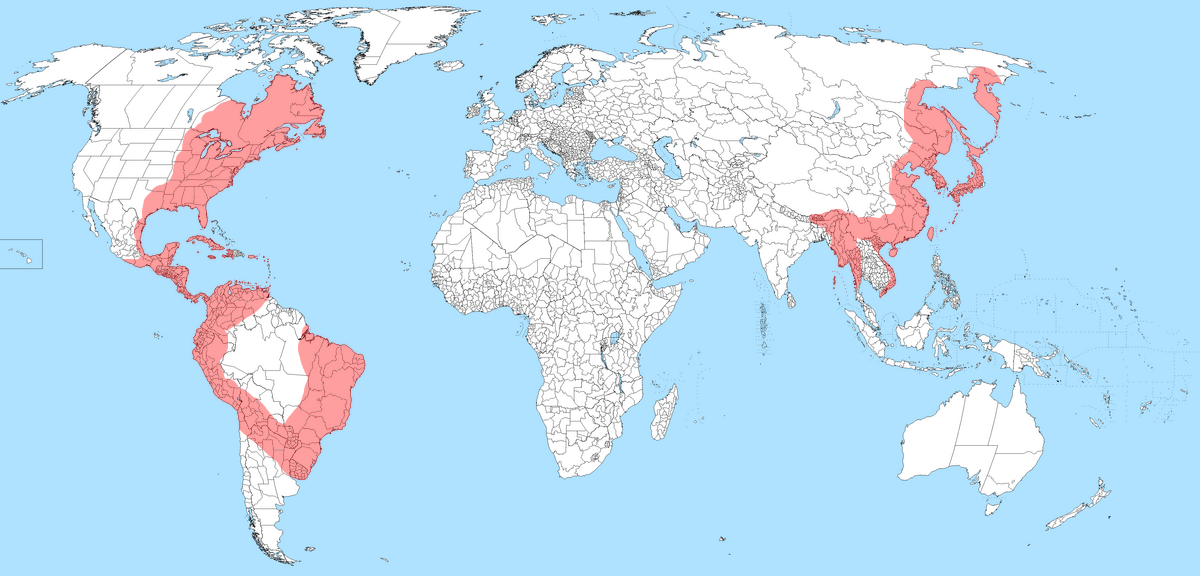
- Distribution map

Synonyms
- Osmunda (Osmundastrum) cinnamomea Presl 1845

= Osmundastrum cinnamomeum =

Osmundastrum cinnamomeum Temporal range: Late Cretaceous to Recent (Campanian-Holocene), 73–0 Ma

Species of fern

Osmundastrum cinnamomeum, commonly known as the cinnamon fern or the buckhorn fern, is a species of royal fern native to the Americas and Asia. It is the sole living representative of the genus Osmundastrum, which was separated from Osmunda after modern phylogenetic studies demonstrated that Osmunda was not monophyletic. In North America it occurs from southern Labrador west to Ontario, and south through the eastern United States to eastern Mexico and the West Indies; in South America it occurs west to Peru and south to Paraguay. In Asia it occurs from southeastern Siberia south through Japan, Korea, China and Taiwan to India, Myanmar, Thailand and Vietnam.

Osmundastrum cinnamomeum has a fossil record extending into the Late Cretaceous of North America, approximately 73 million years ago, making it one of the oldest living plant species. The genus itself goes back to the Triassic.

The cinnamon fern mainly inhabits swamps, bogs and moist woodlands. It also thrives in open meadows as a dominant species. The fern often grows in wet savannas, wetlands, floodplains, marshes, dry-mesic forests and subtropical prairies. The cinnamon fern is a highly successful species and can thrive in temperate, subtropical and tropical ecosystems.

== Description ==
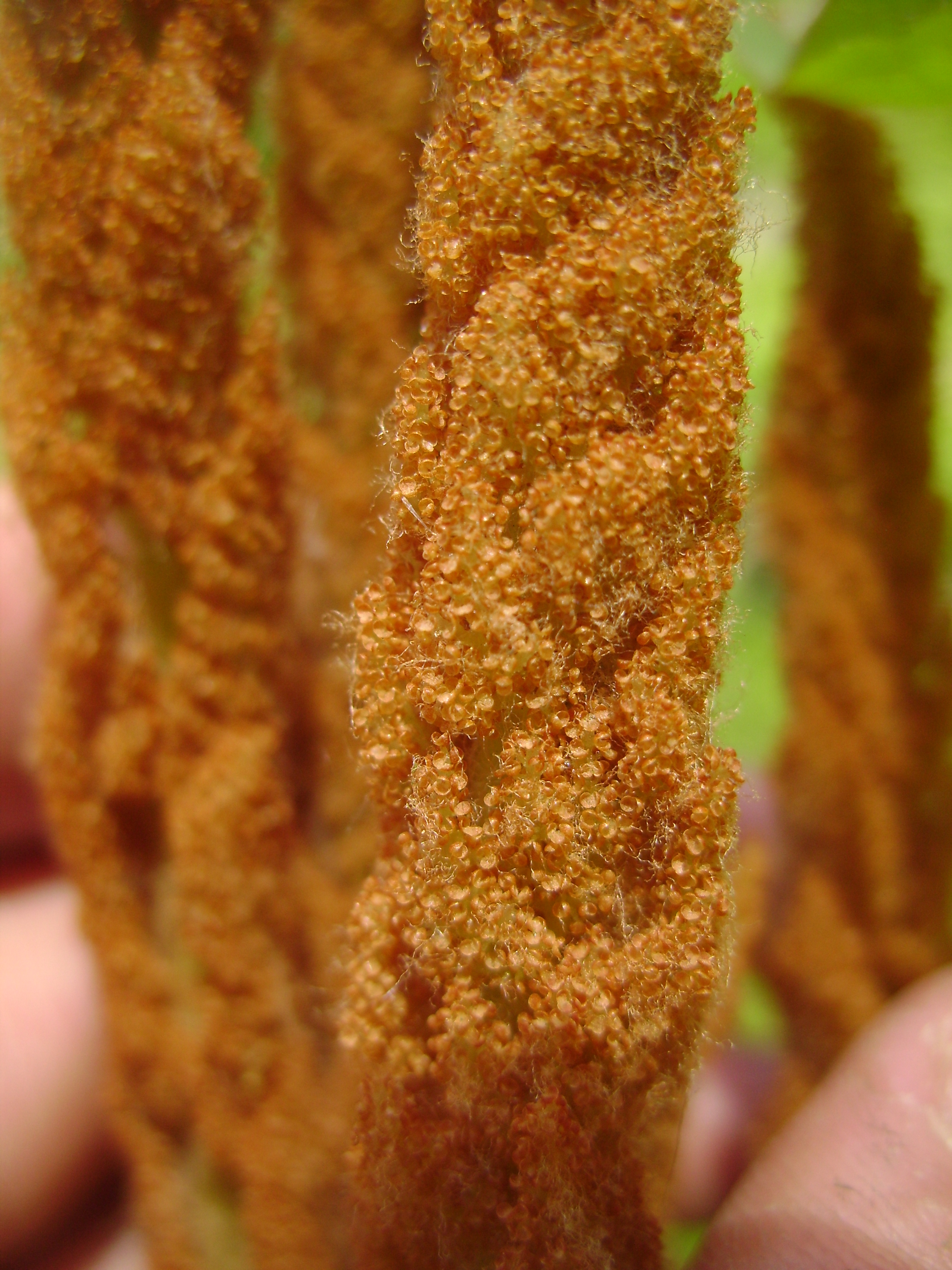
Sporophylls of Osmundastrum cinnamomeum

Osmundastrum cinnamomeum is a semi evergreen but usually deciduous herbaceous plant that produces separate fertile and sterile fronds. The sterile fronds are spreading, 30–150 cm (0.98–4.92 ft) tall and 15–20 cm (5.9–7.9 in) broad, pinnate, with pinnae 5–10 cm (2.0–3.9 in) long and 2–2.5 cm (0.79–0.98 in) broad, deeply lobed (so the fronds are nearly, but not quite, bipinnate). The fertile spore-bearing fronds are erect and shorter, 20–45 cm (7.9–17.7 in) tall; they become cinnamon-colored, which gives the species its name. The fertile leaves appear first; their green color slowly becomes brown as the season progresses and the spores are dropped. The spore-bearing stems persist after the sterile fronds are killed by frost, until the next season. The spores must develop within a few weeks or fail.

It has shallow, black, fibrous roots, and its rhizome, like that of its close relatives, can be trunk-like and erect.

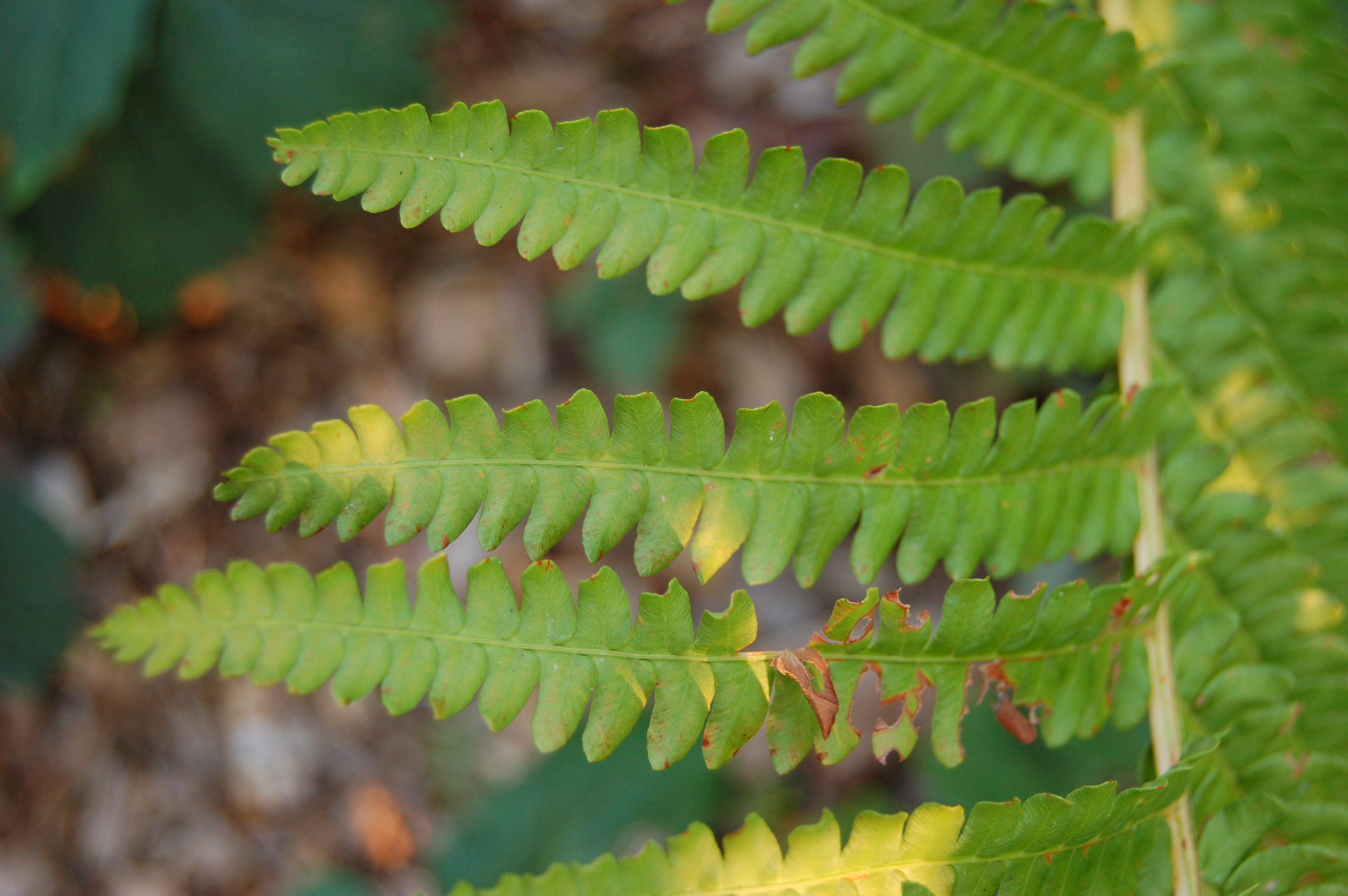
Close-up of the pinnae of a sterile frond

The Osmundastrum cinnamomeum fern forms huge clonal colonies in swampy areas. These ferns form massive rootstocks with densely matted, wiry roots. This root mass is an excellent substrate for many epiphytal plants. They are often harvested as osmunda fiber and used horticulturally, especially in propagating and growing orchids. Cinnamon ferns do not actually produce cinnamon; they are named for the color of the fertile fronds.

Chlorophyll synthesis in Cinnamon fern leaf primordia is regulated by phytochrome (red/far-red light response) and a blue-light-absorbing pigment system. Blue light suppressed elongation, while far-red promoted it, indicating multiple pigment systems regulate development.

== Taxonomic history and classification ==
Historically, the cinnamon fern—now recognized as Osmundastrum cinnamomeum—was classified within the genus Osmunda as Osmunda cinnamomea L., along with other extant osmundaceous ferns. This broad circumscription of Osmunda was based primarily on general morphological similarities shared among royal ferns, such as large fronds, robust rhizomes, and a preference for moist habitats. However, the advent of molecular phylogenetics, combined with renewed morphological scrutiny, has significantly altered our understanding of relationships within the Osmundaceae. Genetic analyses by Metzgar et al. (2008) utilized multiple chloroplast DNA regions to produce a comprehensive phylogeny of the Osmundaceae. Their results demonstrated that Osmunda cinnamomea occupies a unique and deeply diverging lineage, forming a sister group to the rest of the extant members of the family—including Osmunda sensu stricto, Todea, and Leptopteris. These findings were corroborated by Jud et al. (2008), who made detailed morphological assessments of fossil finds and morphological features. Their study further confirmed that O. cinnamomeum differs from other Osmunda species in several key traits, including soral structure, leaf development, and stem anatomy.

The phylogenetic position of Osmundastrum cinnamomeum as sister to all other living Osmundaceae has direct implications for classification. If Osmunda were to retain O. cinnamomeum within its limits, the genus would be rendered paraphyletic—a condition that violates the principle of monophyly required in modern systematic taxonomy. To resolve this, taxonomists have proposed two alternatives: (1) expanding the genus Osmunda to include Todea and Leptopteris, or (2) segregating Osmundastrum as a distinct genus to reflect its evolutionary independence. The second option—recognizing Osmundastrum as a separate genus—has become the accepted approach among most recent taxonomic frameworks, including those adopted in the Pteridophyte Phylogeny Group classification (PPG I, 2016). Under this treatment, Osmundastrum cinnamomeum is the sole extant representative of the genus, reflecting both its genetic distinctiveness and unique morphological character suite. These include simple, non-pinnatifid fertile fronds lacking differentiated sporangial clusters, as well as consistent anatomical traits in the rhizome such as ectophloic dictyoxylic siphonosteles and a homogenous pith composed of prosenchymatous cells. It is possible that some additional fossils should be assigned to Osmundastrum rather than Osmunda. Fossil species like Osmundastrum gvozdevae are known from the fossil record.

Formerly, some authors included the interrupted fern, Osmunda claytoniana, in the genus or section Osmundastrum, because of its gross apparent morphological similarities. However, detailed morphology and genetic analysis have proven that the interrupted fern is actually a true Osmunda. This is borne out by the fact that it is known to hybridize with the American royal fern, Osmunda spectabilis to produce Osmunda × ruggii in a family in which hybrids are rare, while Osmundastrum cinnamomeum has no known hybrids. The modern species has remained largely unchanged since the Late Cretaceous, a phenomenon scientists describe as punctuated equilibrium. Despite this some botanists classify Asian and American populations of the cinnamon fern as separate species, but most botanists generally agree that these are varieties of a single species.

Below is a cladogram showcasing the relationships of Osmundaceae.

- Osmundaceae
  - Osmundastrum cinnamomea
  - - - Todea
      - Leptopteris
    - Osmunda
      - subgenus Claytosmunda (=Osmunda claytoniana)
      - - subgenus Plenasium
        - subgenus Osmunda

== Distribution and habitat ==
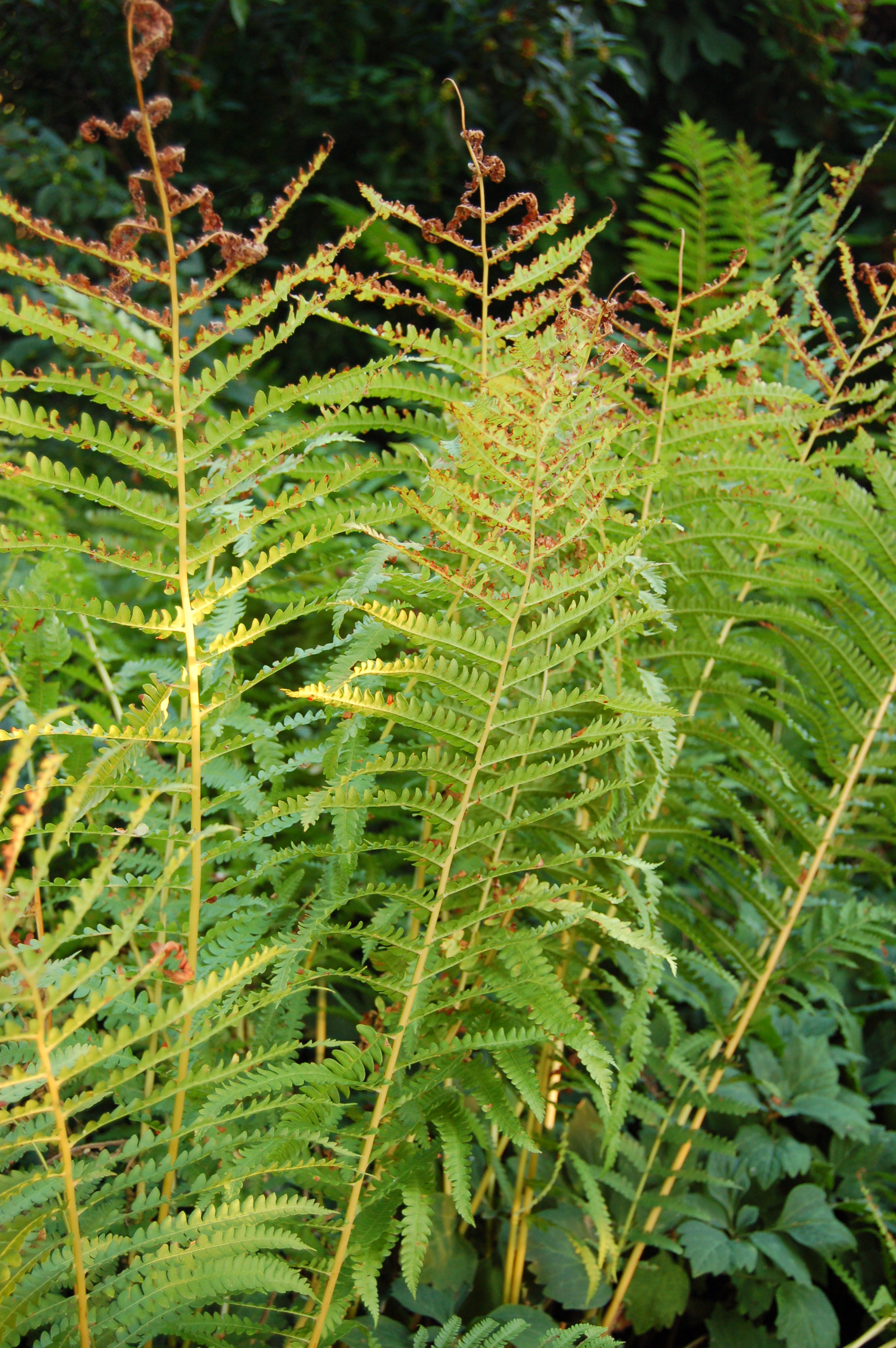
Multiple cinnamon ferns during summer

The range of the cinnamon fern spans both the Old World and the New World, yet it is notably absent from western North America, despite the modern species having evolved there. This distribution makes the cinnamon fern a classic example of the eastern Asian–eastern North American disjunction, a biogeographic pattern in which plant lineages that once had widespread ranges in past geological periods become restricted to the eastern regions of North America and eastern Asia over time. Evidence shows that it continued to persist in Western North America up until the Neogene.

In North America, the cinnamon fern is found throughout much of the Eastern United States, primarily in Alabama, Arkansas, Connecticut, Delaware, Washington D.C., Florida, Georgia, Illinois, Indiana, Iowa, Kentucky, Louisiana, Maine, Maryland, Massachusetts, Michigan, Minnesota, Mississippi, Missouri, New Hampshire, New Jersey, New York, North Carolina, Ohio, eastern Oklahoma, Pennsylvania, Rhode Island, South Carolina, Tennessee, eastern Texas, Vermont, Virginia, West Virginia, and Wisconsin. In Canada, it occurs in New Brunswick, Newfoundland, Nova Scotia, Ontario, Prince Edward Island, and Québec. Its range also extends into Mexico, particularly in the Yucatán dry forests and Petén–Veracruz moist forests, as well as into Central America (Guatemala, El Salvador, Costa Rica, Honduras, and Nicaragua) and the Caribbean, including Haiti, Cuba, Bermuda, Puerto Rico, and Jamaica. In South America, the species is found mainly in Bolivia, Peru, Ecuador, Venezuela, Colombia, Paraguay, Uruguay, and northern Argentina. In Brazil, it is widespread, especially in the states of Alagoas, Bahia, Ceará, Maranhão, Paraíba, Pernambuco, Piauí, Rio Grande do Norte, Sergipe, Paraná, Rio Grande do Sul, Santa Catarina, Espírito Santo, Minas Gerais, Rio de Janeiro, and São Paulo.

In Asia, its northern range extends into the Russian Far East, including Amur, Kamchatka, Khabarovsk, the Kuril Islands, Primorye, and Sakhalin. It is widespread in East Asia, occurring across the entire Korean Peninsula, Japan, and much of the People's Republic of China—particularly in Hunan, Henan, Hubei, Jiangxi, Anhui, Guangdong, Fujian, Zhejiang, Hong Kong, Macau, Jiangsu, Heilongjiang, Jilin, and Liaoning. The species is also present on Taiwan (ROC). In Southeast Asia, it is mainly found in Vietnam, Thailand, and Myanmar (Burma). In South Asia, the cinnamon fern occurs in Bhutan and northeastern India, primarily in Arunachal Pradesh, Assam, Manipur, Meghalaya, Mizoram, Nagaland, Tripura, and Sikkim.

Due to its broad range, the Cinnamon fern inhabits a wide variety of ecoregions. In the United States alone, it can be found in habitats ranging from the wet Atlantic Coastal Pine Barrens and boggy coastal swamps to the Texas Blackland Prairies. The fern can grow in Organic soil but it can also grow in sand. It prefers shade but can be found to grow in areas with more direct sunlight.

== Ecology ==
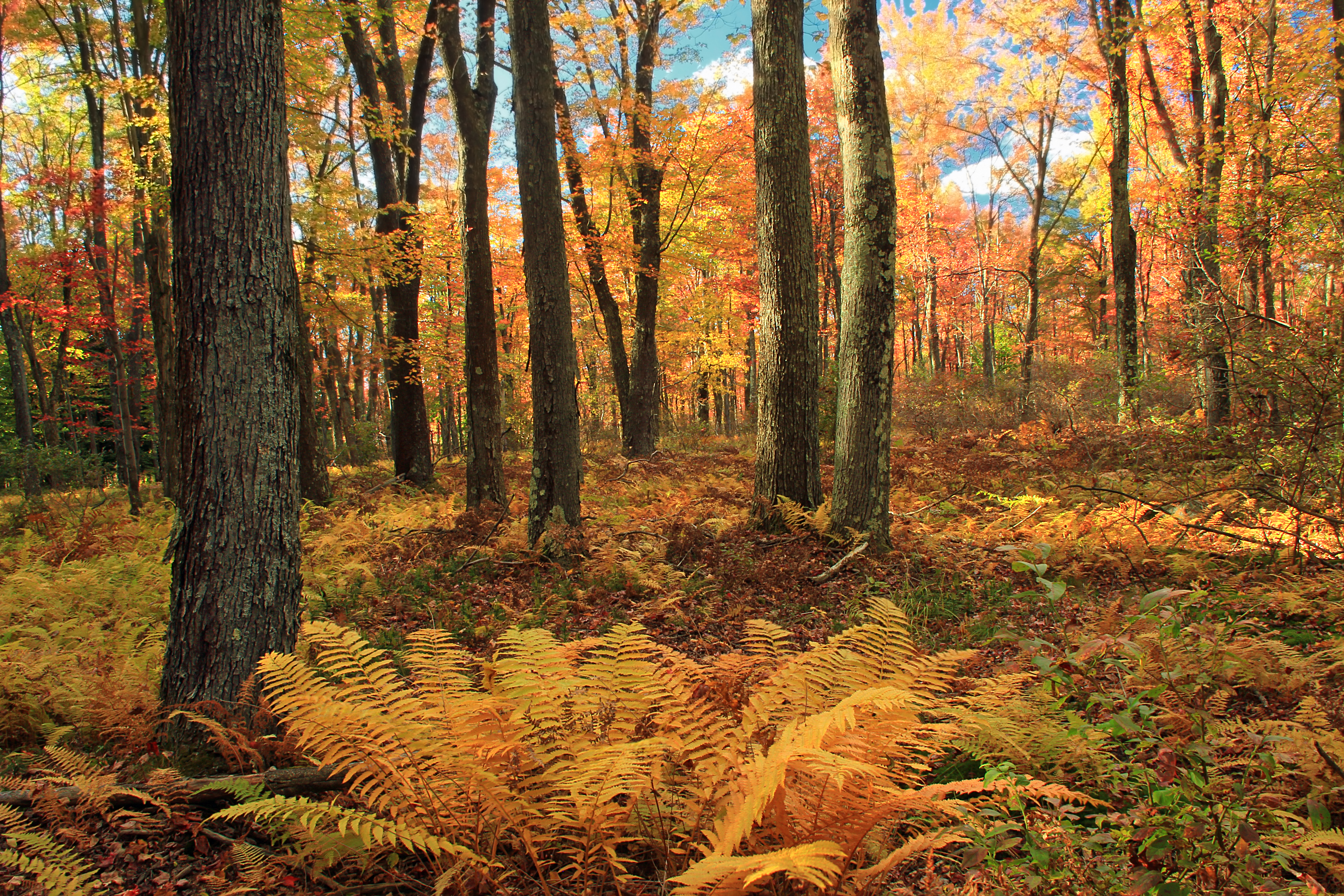
A cinnamon fern during autumn

The cinnamon fern typically grows in moist, acidic soils and shows a strong preference for wetland environments (although it does thrive in dry-mesic forests with seasonal sub-irrigation). The fern can grow in Organic soil but it can also grow in sand. It prefers shade but can be found to grow in areas with more direct sunlight. It also thrives in expansive meadowlands, where it often becomes one of the most dominant species present. In a study examining forest understory vegetation, the cinnamon fern was found in the wettest plots and exhibited high sensitivity to changes in soil moisture, suggesting a strong adaptation to saturated or hydric soils. The fern is very cold hardy.

The cinnamon fern plays a multifaceted ecological role in its habitats—from altering carbon and water dynamics to participating in complex reproductive signaling and hosting symbiotic fungi. In constructed wetlands treating aquaculture wastewater, cinnamon fern helped reduce pollutants such as total phosphorus, ammonia nitrogen, and turbidity. This shows potential for the fern's use in phytoremediation and nutrient cycling in wetland systems. Cinnamon fern-dominated understories in high-elevation Appalachian forests are strongly associated with higher soil respiration (Rs) during summer months, suggesting they influence carbon cycling more actively during the growing season.

Cinnamon ferns are known hosts to Mixia osmundae, a rare intracellular parasitic fungus. Like most ferns, the cinnamon fern is toxic to most herbivores in its adult stage and is generally avoided. Ferns of the Osmundaceae family tend to carry a high amount of lanthanum which is toxic to most mammals. While ferns are not a significant part of the diet of most modern herbivores, evidence suggests they may have played a more prominent role in the diets of prehistoric animals. The oldest fossils of the modern species have been found in the Horseshoe Canyon Formation in Alberta and the Prince Creek Formation of Alaska, both of these formations are around the same age and have similar fauna such as the ceratopsian known as Pachyrhinosaurus and the hadrosaur known as Edmontosaurus. Evidence indicates that these dinosaurs probably consumed ferns (including the Cinnamon fern) as part of their diet and were able to extract nutrients out of them. The Cinnamon fern was major part of the fern community in these Cretaceous aged formations and existed alongside many other ferns in a warm environment. It lived alongside ferns such as Blechnum and Microlepia but also other types of plants like Ginkgos, Redwoods, Parataxodium and Trochodendroides in these Cretaceous habitats. It briefly coexisted with another species, O. precinnamomea, during the Paleogene.

The cinnamon fern today is often found growing alongside the bracken, lipferns, Christmas fern, Blechnum, horsetails and its close relative, the American royal fern. In Eastern North America, it grows in diverse forests containing a wide variety of tree species, including oaks, birches, hickories, walnuts, maples, ashes, hazels, sweetgums, tulip trees, elms, dogwoods, junipers, beeches, magnolias, sycamores (plane trees), pines, arborvitaes, spruces, bald cypresses, larches, firs, yews, podocarps, cycads and laurels, among others. In South America, it is found alongside tree ferns, cycads, podocarps, Nothofagus trees, magnolias, Araucaria trees, walnuts, Ocotea trees, and other species. In Asia, it occurs in forests dominated by larches, magnolias, podocarps, a sycamore, figs, spruces, pines, firs, spruces, laurels, dogwoods, yews, hickories, wingnuts, birches, ginkgos, walnuts, arborvitaes, cycads and oaks.

== Uses ==
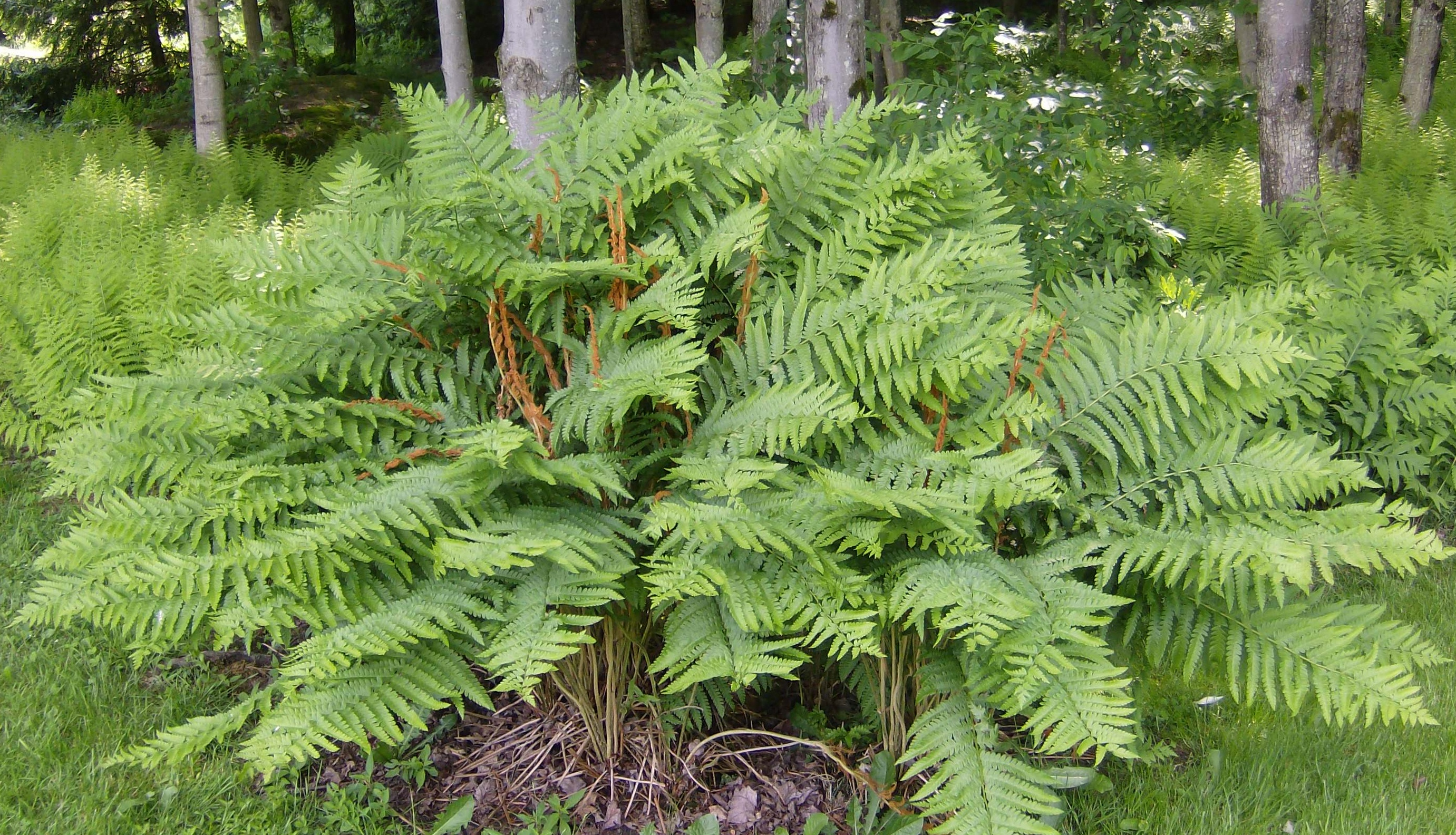
Cinnamon ferns near a forest

Cinnamon fern has been historically used by the Abenaki and Menominee as a food source. The Iroquois and Cherokee tribes used the fern for a wide variety of medicinal purposes including as a cold remedy, gynecological aid, venereal aid, and as a remedy to snake bites.

The Cinnamon fern is often used in constructed wetlands for wastewater treatment, due to its ability to tolerate waterlogged conditions and contribute to nutrient removal. It is mainly hardy in USDA hardiness zones 4–9, though it can also be grown down to USDA zone 11.
