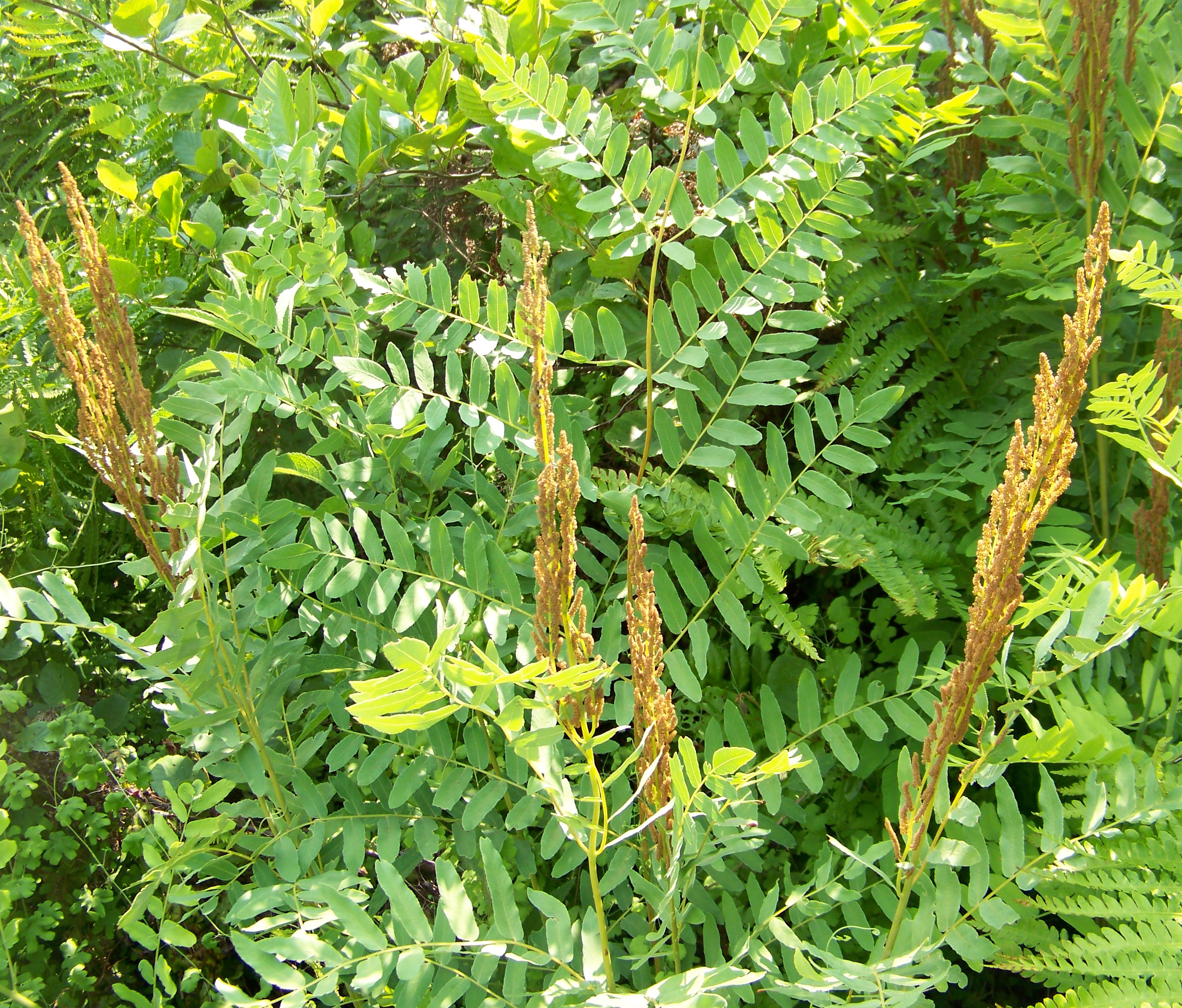

Conservation status
- Least Concern (IUCN 3.1)

Scientific classification
- Kingdom: Plantae
- Clade: Tracheophytes
- Division: Polypodiophyta
- Class: Polypodiopsida
- Order: Osmundales
- Family: Osmundaceae
- Genus: Osmunda
- Species: O. spectabilis

Binomial name
- Osmunda spectabilis Willd.

Synonyms
- List: Osmunda glaucescens Link.; Osmunda gracilis Link; Osmunda mexicana Fée; Osmunda palmeri A.E.Bobrov; Osmunda palustris Schrad.; Osmunda piresii Brade; Osmunda regalis var. brasiliensis (Grev. & Hook.) Pic.Serm.; Osmunda regalis var. palustris (Schrad.) C.Chr. ex Angely; Osmunda regalis subsp. palustris (Schrad.) Á.Löve & D.Löve; Osmunda regalis subsp. spectabilis (Willd.) Á.Löve & D.Löve; Osmunda regalis var. spectabilis (Willd.) A.Gray; Osmunda spectabilis var. brasiliensis Grev. & Hook.

= Osmunda spectabilis =

Species of fern

Osmunda spectabilis, known as American royal fern, is a species of fern native to a large area of the New World, from the eastern half of Canada and the United States to Argentina.

== Description ==
Osmunda spectabilis is an easy fern to recognize in the New World flora. Although it closely resembles species O. regalis, O. japonica, and O. lancea, only O. spectabilis is found growing naturally in the New World. The fronds of O. spectabilis can exceed 1 meter in length and are bipinnate. The pinnules are attached by a very narrow base. The plant produces separate sterile and fertile fronds. Fertile fronds are similar to the sterile fronds, in the lower and middle portions, but the top-most pinnae are fertile and they are much reduced and brown when mature in the early summer.

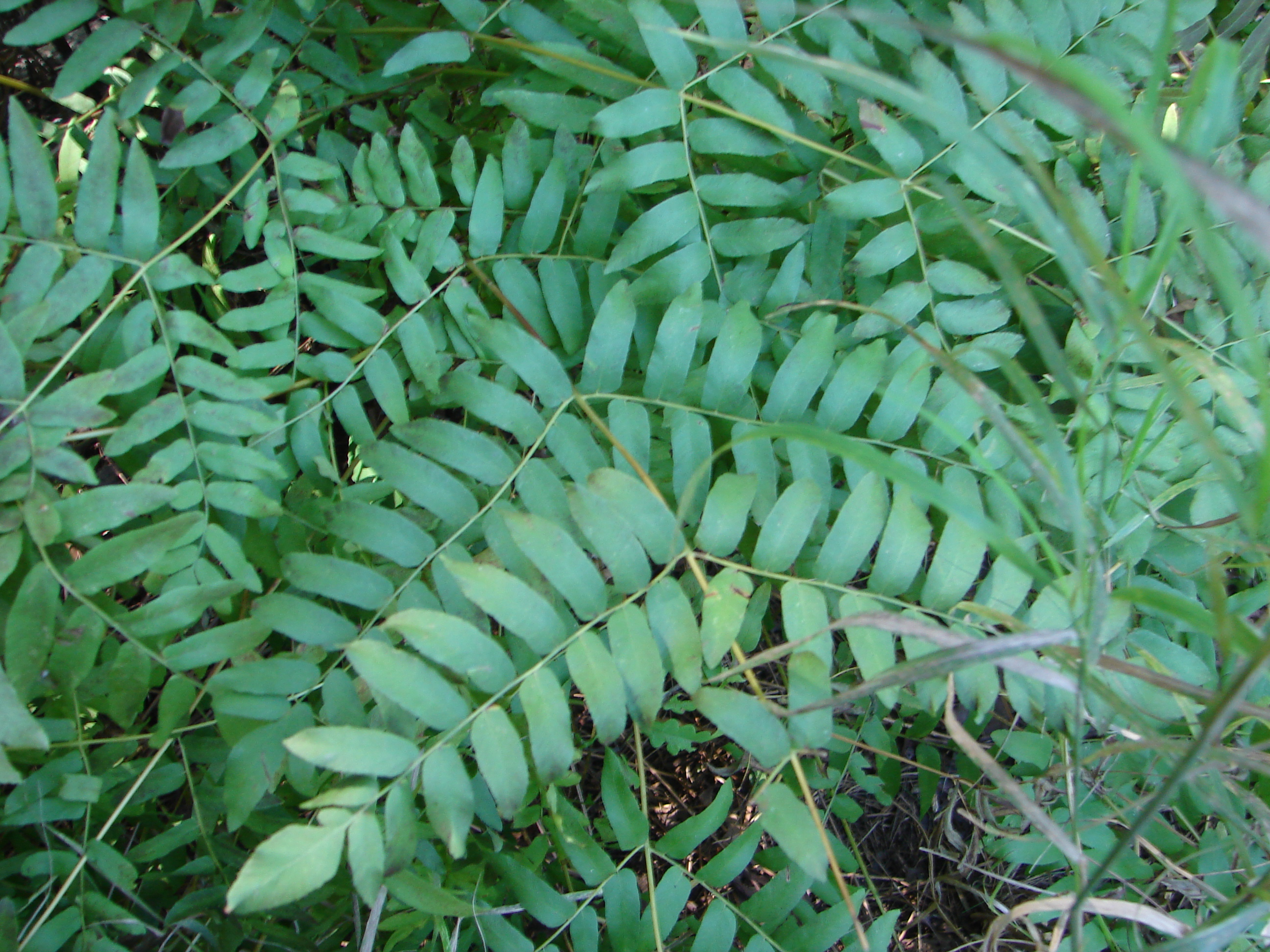
Closeup of sterile frond

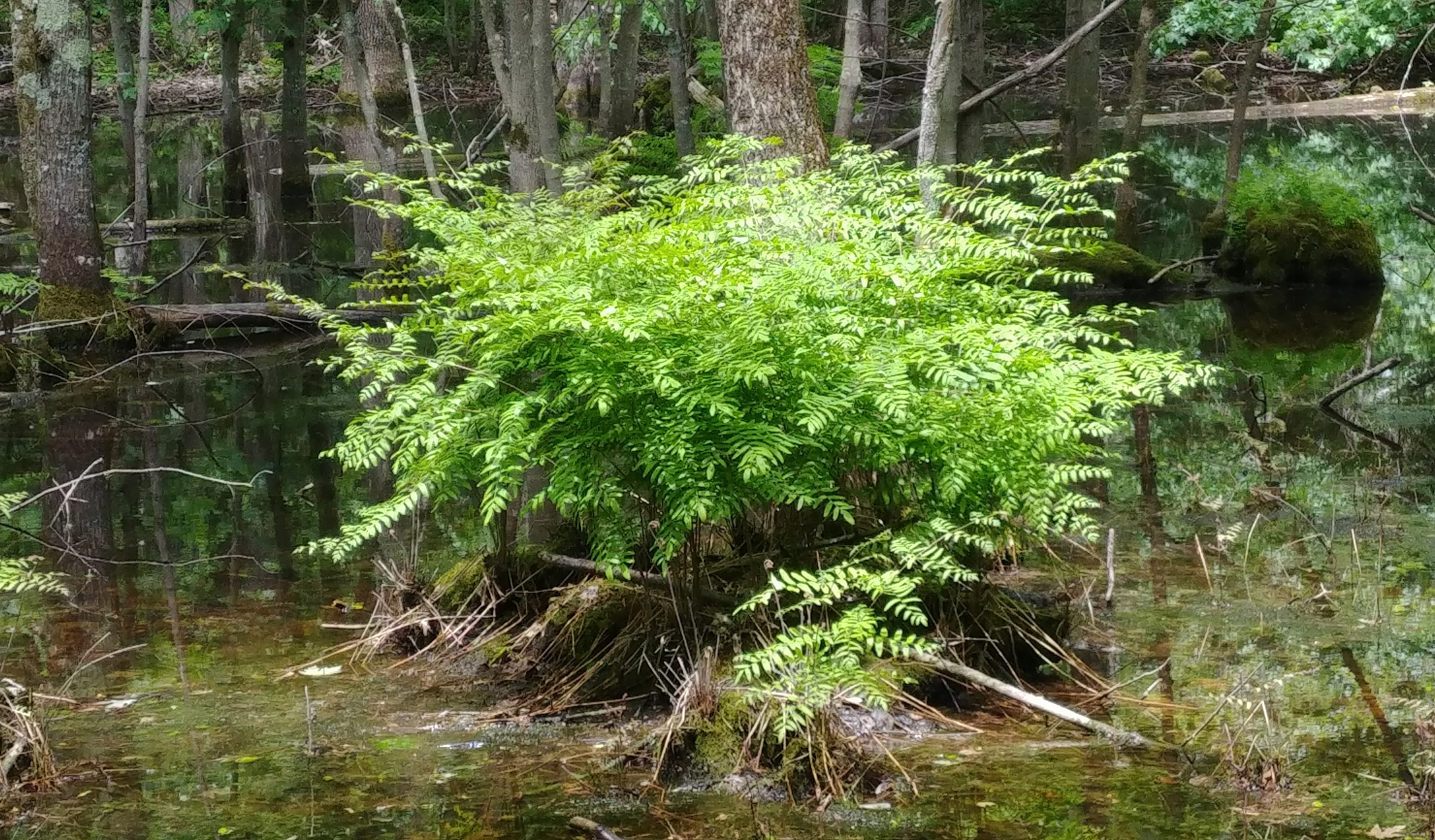
Mature plant

== Distribution and habitat ==
American royal fern is most commonly found growing in wetter soils such as those found in wet forests, bogs, and along streams and lakes.

== Taxonomy ==
- Osmunda
  - subg. Claytosmunda
    Claytosmunda claytoniana
  - - subg. Plenasium
      - Plenasium javanicum
      - - Plenasium banksiifolium
        - Plenasium vachellii
    - subg. Osmunda
      - Osmunda regalis
      - - Osmunda spectabilis
        - - Osmunda japonica
          - Osmunda lancea

Osmunda spectabilis was formerly considered to be a variety of Osmunda regalis (Osmunda regalis var. spectabilis). Another variety, Osmunda spectabilis var. brasiliensis, (formerly Osmunda regalis var. brasiliensis) also exists in tropical regions of Central and South America, but it is only recognized by some authors.

Osmunda angustifolia, Osmunda bromeliifolia, and all extinct Osmunda species are missing from this cladogram. The classification is based on the genetic analysis presented in "The Paraphyly of Osmunda is Confirmed by Phylogenetic Analyses of Seven Plastid Loci."
