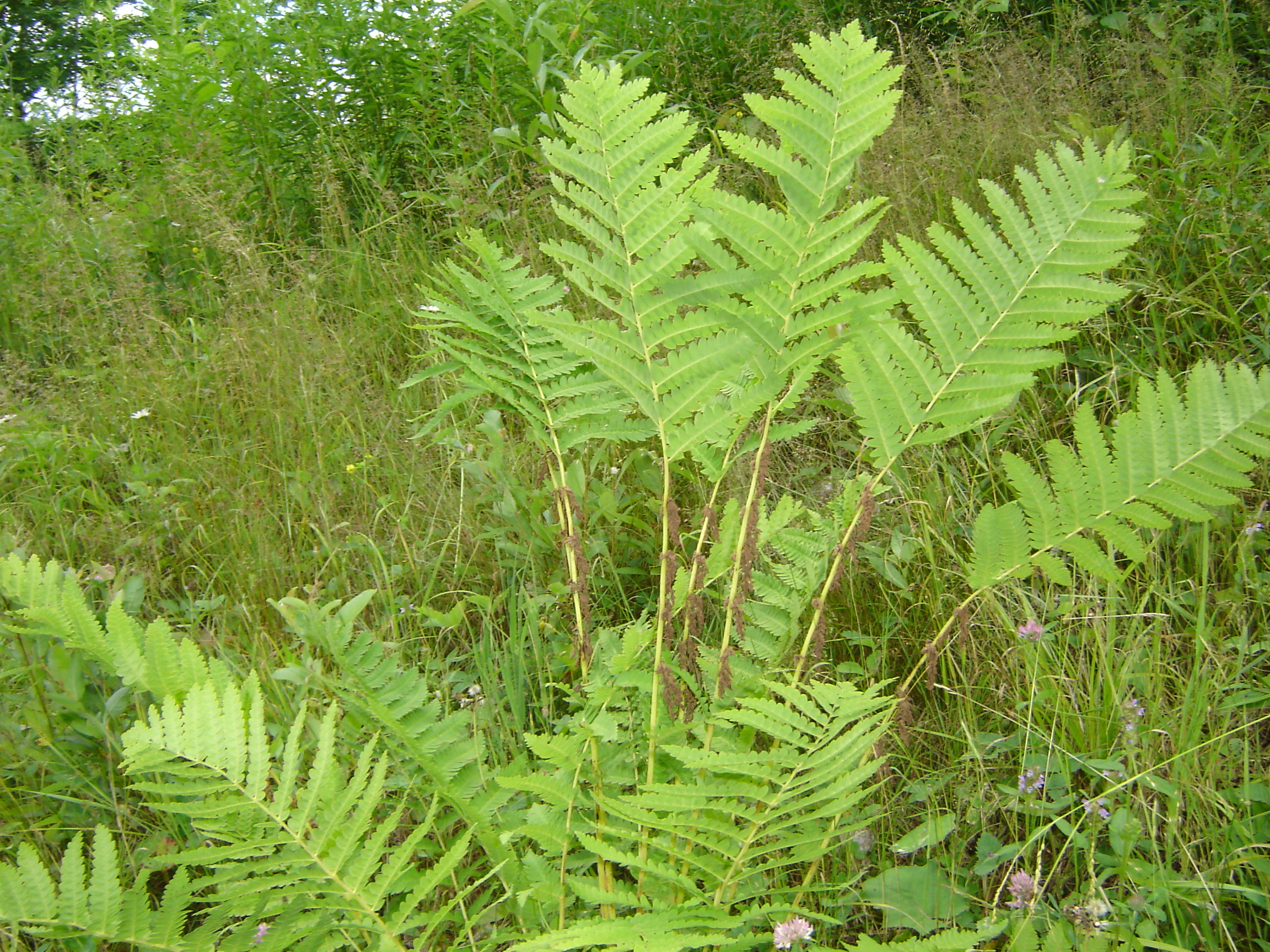

Conservation status
- Secure (NatureServe)

Scientific classification
- Kingdom: Plantae
- Clade: Tracheophytes
- Division: Polypodiophyta
- Class: Polypodiopsida
- Order: Osmundales
- Family: Osmundaceae
- Genus: Claytosmunda (Y.Yatabe, N.Murak. & K.Iwats.) Metzgar & Rouhan
- Species: C. claytoniana

Binomial name
- Claytosmunda claytoniana (L.) Metzgar & Rouhan

Synonyms
- (genus): Osmunda subgenus Claytosmunda; (species): Osmunda claytoniana L.; Osmundastrum claytonianum (L.) Tagawa

= Claytosmunda =

Claytosmunda Temporal range: Middle Triassic–Recent

Genus of ferns

Claytosmunda is a genus of fern. It has only one extant species, Claytosmunda claytoniana (synonym Osmunda claytoniana), the interrupted fern, native to Eastern Asia, Eastern United States, and Eastern Canada.

The specific epithet is named after the English-born Virginian botanist John Clayton. "Interrupted" describes the gap in middle of the blade left by the fertile portions after they wither and eventually fall off.

The plant is known from fossils to have grown in Europe, showing a previous circumboreal distribution. Fragmentary foliage resembling Claytosmunda has been found in the fossil record as far back as the Triassic.

== Description ==
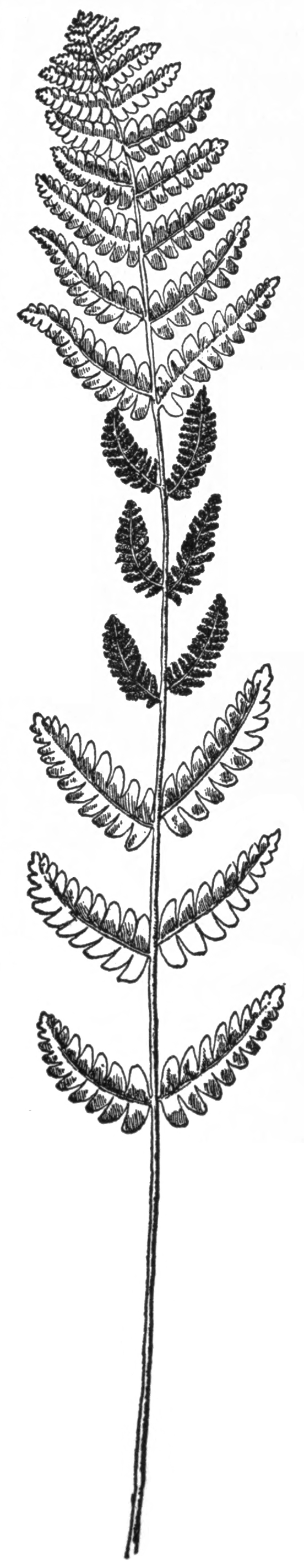
The fertile middle pinnae give the frond an "interrupted" gap

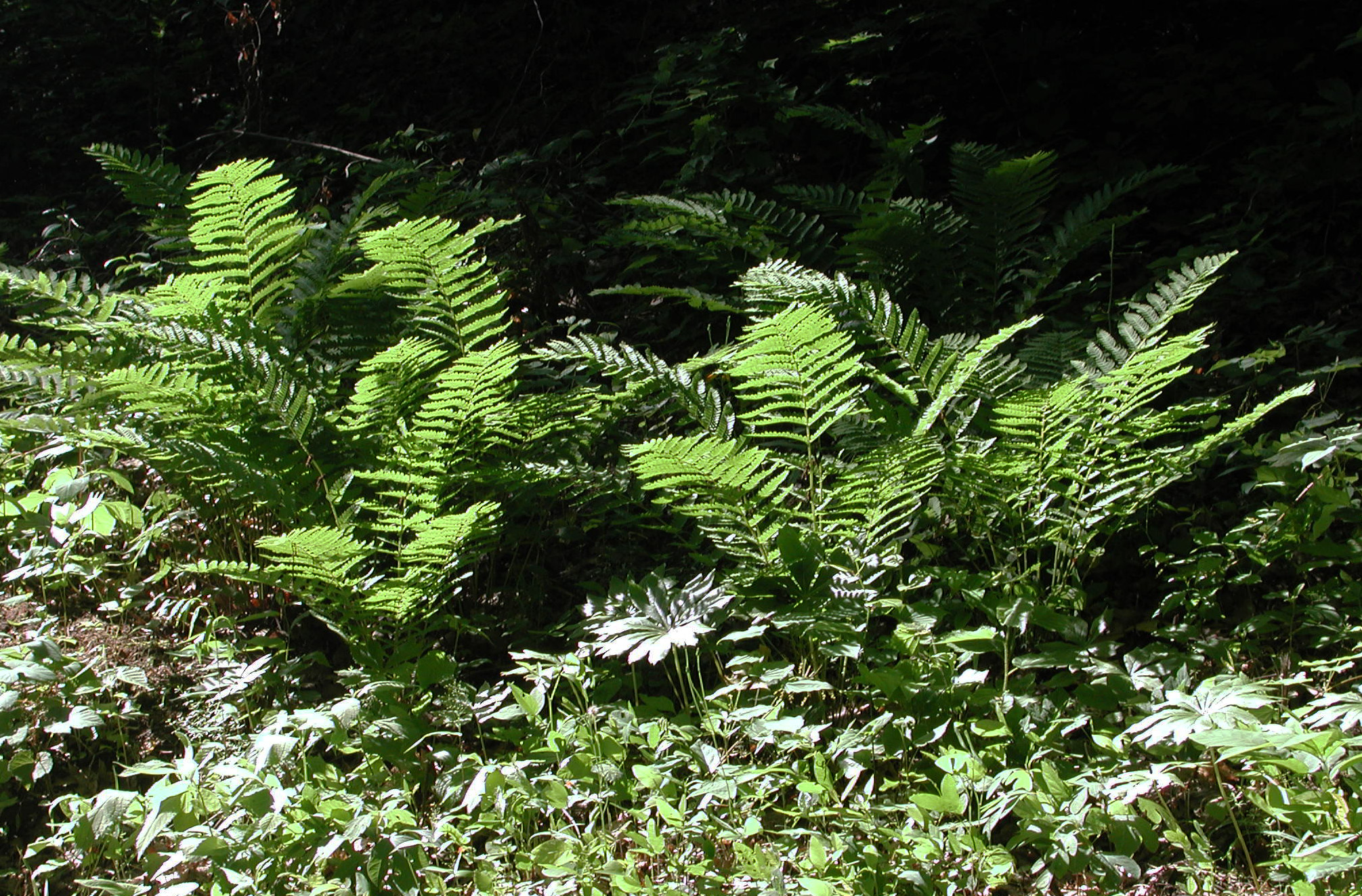
Interrupted fern in evening light

Claytosmunda claytoniana fronds are bipinnate, 40–100 cm (16–39 in) tall and 20–30 cm (8–12 in) broad, the blade formed of alternate segments forming an arching blade tightening to a pointed end. The lower end is also slightly thinner than the rest of the frond because the first segments are shorter. Three to seven short, cinnamon-colored fertile segments are inserted in the middle of the length, giving the plant its name.

In their absence, the plant in all its stages appears similar to Osmundastrum cinnamomeum (cinnamon fern). The base of the segments distinguishes the two species: where O. cinnamomeum has typical felt-like hairs, the few hairs present on C. claytoniana are extremely short, usually requiring a magnifying glass to see well.

Like other species in the family Osmundaceae, it grows a very large rhizome, with persistent stipe bases from previous years. It forms small, dense colonies, spreading locally through its rhizome, and often forming fairy rings.

== Taxonomy ==
The species was first described by Carl Linnaeus in 1753, as Osmunda claytoniana. In 2005, it was recognized as being somewhat different from other species in the genus by being placed in a separate subgenus, Osmunda subgenus Claytosmunda. In 2016, the subgenus was raised to a new genus, Claytosmunda, as part of the Pteridophyte Phylogeny Group classification (PPG I). The change of genus is recognized in some taxonomic databases. Others place the species in the genus Osmundastrum. The oldest known species of Claytosmunda is C. beardmorensis, from the Middle Triassic of Antarctica. Claytosmunda when considering fossils is paraphyletic, as some of the fossils are likely to be more closely related to modern Osmunda and Plenasium than they are to the modern C. claytoniana.

=== Extinct species ===
After

- †C. beardmorensis (J.M.Schopf, 1978) (Middle Triassic: East Antarctica).
- †C. chengii Blomfleur et al. 2017 (Middle Jurassic: Liaoning, China).
- †C. johnstonii (Tidwell, Munzing & M.R.Banks, 1991) (?Early Jurassic: Tasmania, Australia).
- †C. embreii (Stockey & S.Y.Sm., 2000) (Early Cretaceous: California, USA).
- †C. liaoningensis (Wu Zhang & Shao-Lin Zheng, 1991) (Middle Jurassic: Liaoning, China).
- †C. nathorstii (C.N.Mill., 1967) (Palaeogene: Svalbard).
- †C. plumites (N.Tian & Y.D.Wang 2014[a]) (Middle Jurassic: Liaoning, China).
- †C. preosmunda (Y.M.Cheng, Yu F.Wang & C.S.Li, 2007) (Middle Jurassic: Liaoning, China).
- †C. sinica (Y.M.Cheng & C.S.Li, 2007) (Middle Jurassic: Liaoning, China).
- †C. tekelili (E.I.Vera, 2012) (Early Cretaceous: West Antarctica).
- †C. wangii (N.Tian & Y.D.Wang, 2014[b]) (Middle Jurassic: Liaoning, China).
- †C. wehrii (C.N.Mill., 1982) (Miocene: Washington, USA).
- †C. zhangiana Tian et al, 2021. (Middle Jurassic, Liaoning, China)

== Distribution ==
=== North America ===
In eastern North America it occurs in: the Great Lakes region; eastern Canada – in southern Manitoba, Ontario, Quebec (north to tree line); and east to Newfoundland; eastern United States – upper New England south through the Appalachian Mountains and Atlantic seaboard, into the Southeastern United States in Georgia and Alabama; and west across the Southern United States to Mississippi River, and back up the Mississippi embayment through the Midwestern United States to the Great Lakes.

=== Asia ===
In eastern Asia, the fern is found in the subtropical and temperate Asia in: the Eastern Himalaya, South Central China and Eastern China, Taiwan, the Korean Peninsula, the Ryukyu Islands, and Japan.

=== Ecology ===
Claytosmunda claytoniana is found in humid zones, mostly in forests, but also in more open habitats and biomes, although rarely in bogs. The interrupted fern is often found alongside ostrich, cinnamon, and sensitive ferns.

=== Hybrids ===
Osmunda × ruggii, is a hybrid between C. claytoniana and O. spectabilis (American royal fern). The hybrid is considered important because it suggests a closer genetic relationship between C. claytoniana and O. spectabilis than between C. claytoniana and O. cinnamomeum (a fact which has led to moving O. cinnamomeum out of Osmunda and into its own genus Osmundastrum). Osmunda × ruggii is sterile and is known from only about two natural populations, despite the many areas in which both C. claytoniana and O. spectabilis are found.

== Uses ==
=== Medicinal ===
The Haudenosaunee used the plant as treatment for blood disorders and venereal diseases.
