= Osmunda × ruggii =

Scientific classification
- Kingdom: Plantae
- Clade: Tracheophytes
- Division: Polypodiophyta
- Class: Polypodiopsida
- Order: Osmundales
- Family: Osmundaceae
- Genus: Osmunda
- Species: O. × ruggii

Binomial name
- Osmunda × ruggii R.M.Tryon

Species of fern

Osmunda × ruggii is a sterile hybrid between Claytosmunda claytoniana and Osmunda spectabilis.
