= Royal fern =

Royal fern or Royal Fern may refer to:

- Osmunda regalis, a fern native to Europe, Africa and Asia
- Osmunda spectabilis, or American royal fern
- Royal Fern Park, a golf course under development in Llangyfelach, Swansea, Wales
