= Plenasium angustifolium =

Scientific classification
- Kingdom: Plantae
- Clade: Tracheophytes
- Division: Polypodiophyta
- Class: Polypodiopsida
- Order: Osmundales
- Family: Osmundaceae
- Genus: Plenasium
- Species: P. angustifolium

Binomial name
- Plenasium angustifolium (Ching) A.E.Bobrov

Synonyms
- Osmunda angustifolia Ching; Osmunda collina Sledge; Osmunda zeylanica Kunze; Plenasium zeylanicum (Kunze) A.E.Bobrov

Species of fern

Plenasium angustifolium is a fern in the family Osmundaceae. The genus Plenasium is recognized in the Pteridophyte Phylogeny Group classification of 2016 (PPG I); however, some sources place all Plenasium species in a more broadly defined Osmunda, treating this species as Osmunda angustifolia. It is native to eastern Thailand, Laos and southern China (Hainan, Guangdong, Hong Kong, Hunan), and has been introduced into India and Sri Lanka.
