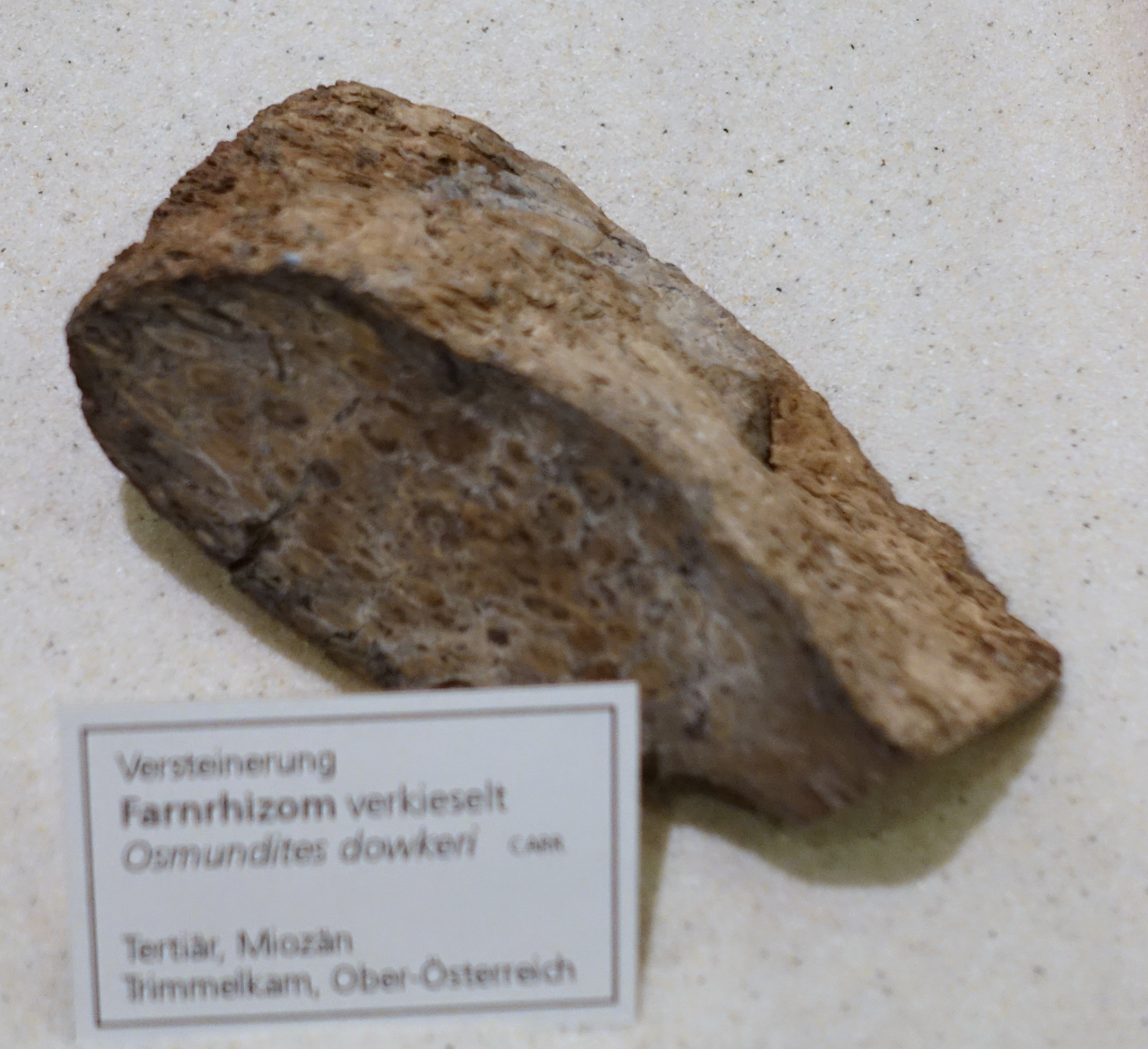
- Osmundites dowkeri

Scientific classification
- Kingdom: Plantae
- Clade: Tracheophytes
- Division: Polypodiophyta
- Class: Polypodiopsida
- Order: Osmundales
- Family: Osmundaceae
- Genus: †Osmundites

Species
- O. brasiliensis †; O. carnieri †; O. kolbei †; O. natalensis †

= Osmundites =

Osmundites Temporal range: 299–65 Ma

Extinct genus of ferns

Osmundites is an extinct genus of the family Osmundaceae.

== Species ==
- Osmundites brasiliensis: In Brazil, the species was described by Andrews in 1950. It was located in the municipality of Rio Pardo. It's in the geopark Paleorrota in Rio Bonito Formation and date from Sakmarian at Permian.
