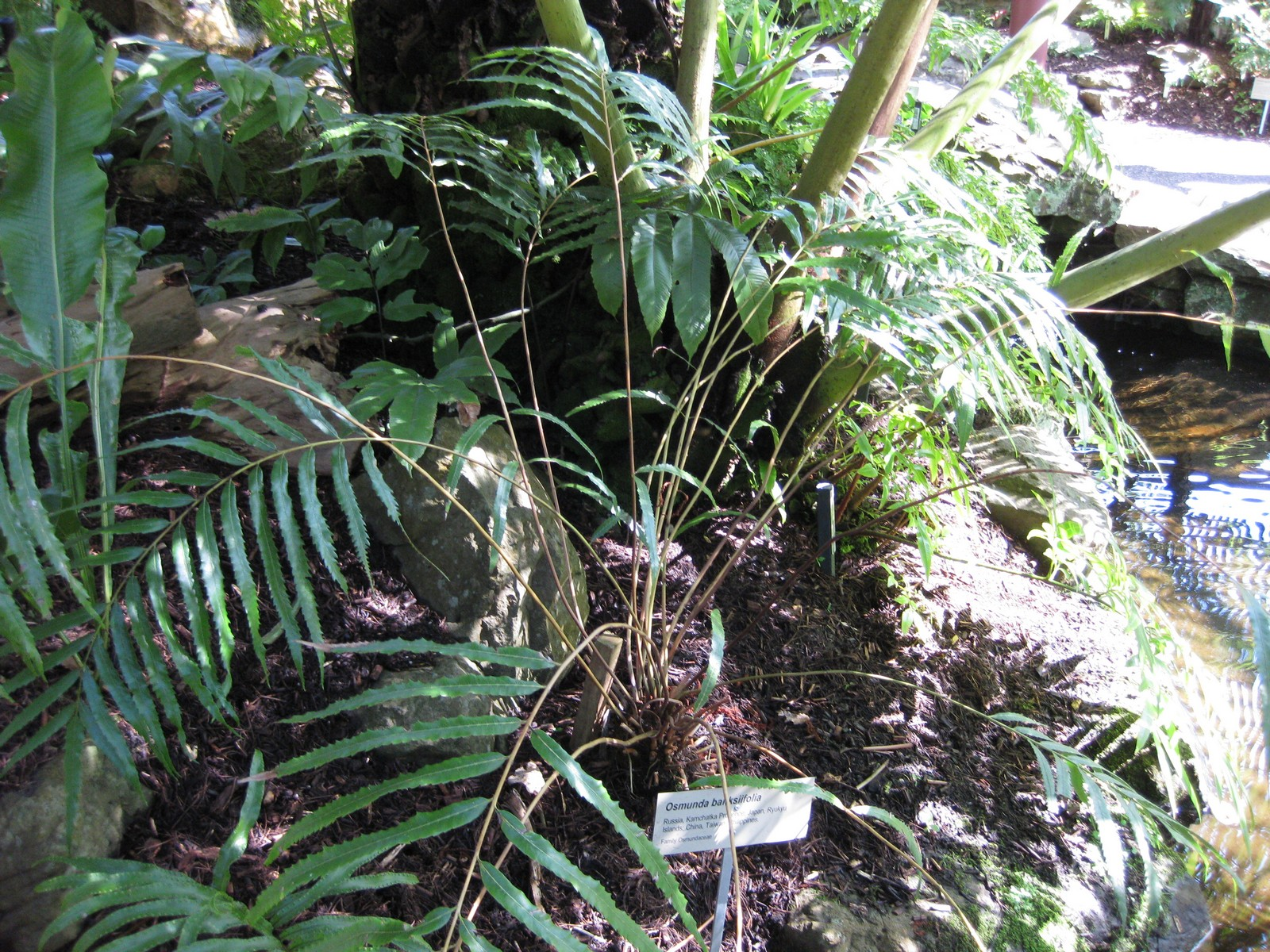
- Plenasium banksiifolium

Scientific classification
- Kingdom: Plantae
- Clade: Tracheophytes
- Division: Polypodiophyta
- Class: Polypodiopsida
- Order: Osmundales
- Family: Osmundaceae
- Genus: Plenasium
- Species: P. banksiifolium

Binomial name
- Plenasium banksiifolium (C.Presl) C.Presl

Synonyms
- Asplenium aureum Blume; Nephrodium banksiifolium C.Presl; Nephrodium bromeliifolium C.Presl; Osmunda banksiifolia (C.Presl) Kuhn; Osmunda banksiifolia var.bromeliifolia (C.Presl) Kuhn; Osmunda bromeliifolia (C.Presl) Copel.; Osmunda haenkeana C.Presl; Osmunda oxyodon Miq.; Osmunda presliana J.Sm.; Plenasium aureum (Blume) C.Presl; Plenasium bromeliifolium (C.Presl) C.Presl; Plenasium oxyodon (Miq.) A.E.Bobrov

= Plenasium banksiifolium =

Species of fern

Plenasium banksiifolium is a fern in the family Osmundaceae. The genus Plenasium is recognized in the Pteridophyte Phylogeny Group classification of 2016 (PPG I); however, some sources place all Plenasium species in a more broadly defined Osmunda, treating this species as Osmunda banksiifolia. It is native along the Pacific coast of Asia, being found in the Kamchatka Peninsula, the Ryukyu Islands, Japan, southeast China, Taiwan, the Philippines, Borneo, Sulawesi and Java. P. banksiifolium, which can reach a height of 1.5 m, is the largest species in the genus and has ornamental value.

== Description ==
The appearance of the fertile pinnae are very different from that of the sterile pinnae, the fertile pinnae are curled. The sporangia can also grow on the vegetative pinnae immediately above and below the fertile pinnae, with a compact shape; so we might say that P. banksiifolium has three types of pinnae: fertile, sterile, and semi-fertile. The young opening sterile pinnae are red, the fertile pinnae are mustard yellow at first, then turn green and finally reddish brown. The fertile pinnae can reach more than ten pairs.

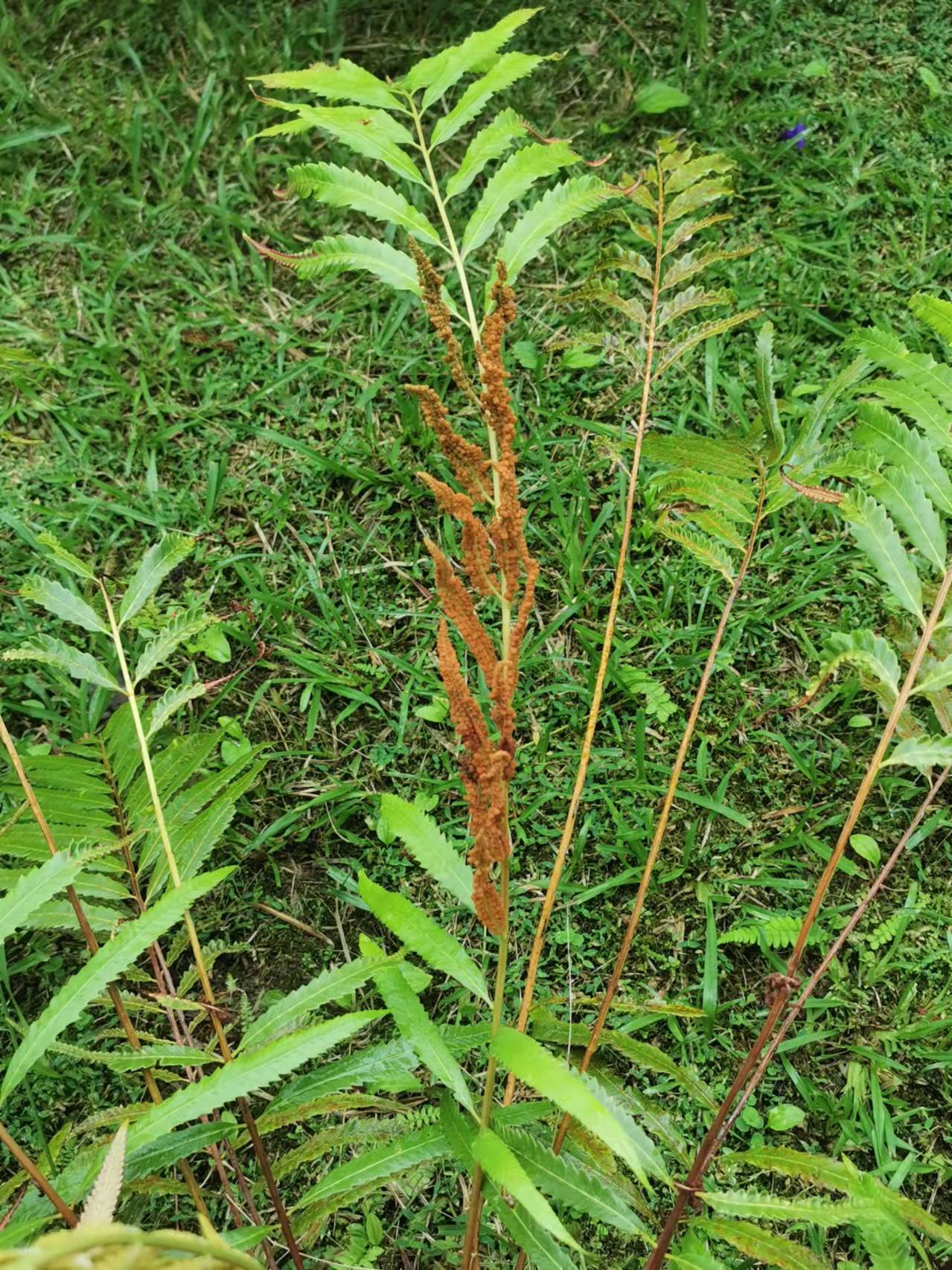
Sporophylls and vegetative pinnae

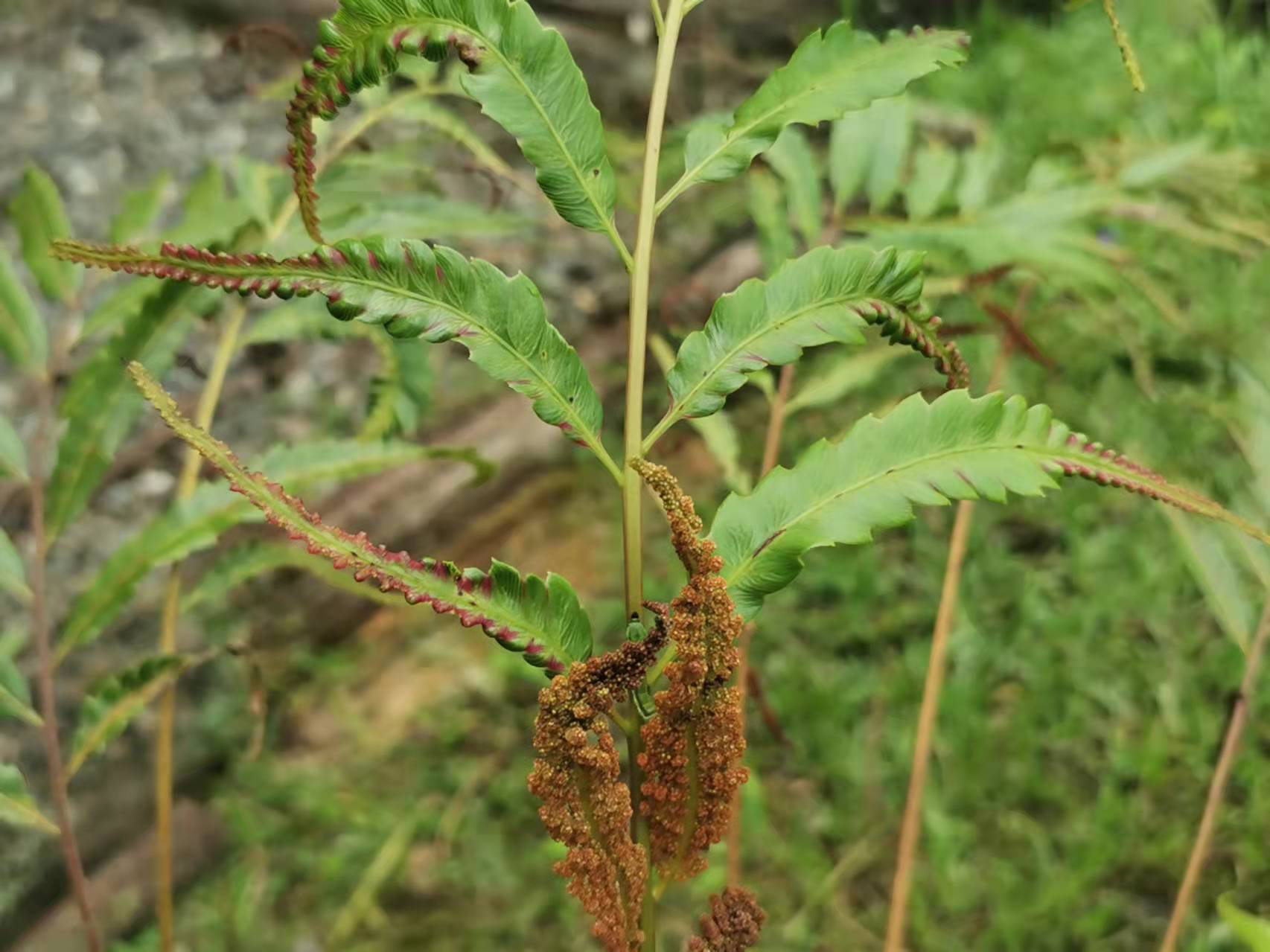
The sporangia on the vegetative pinnae

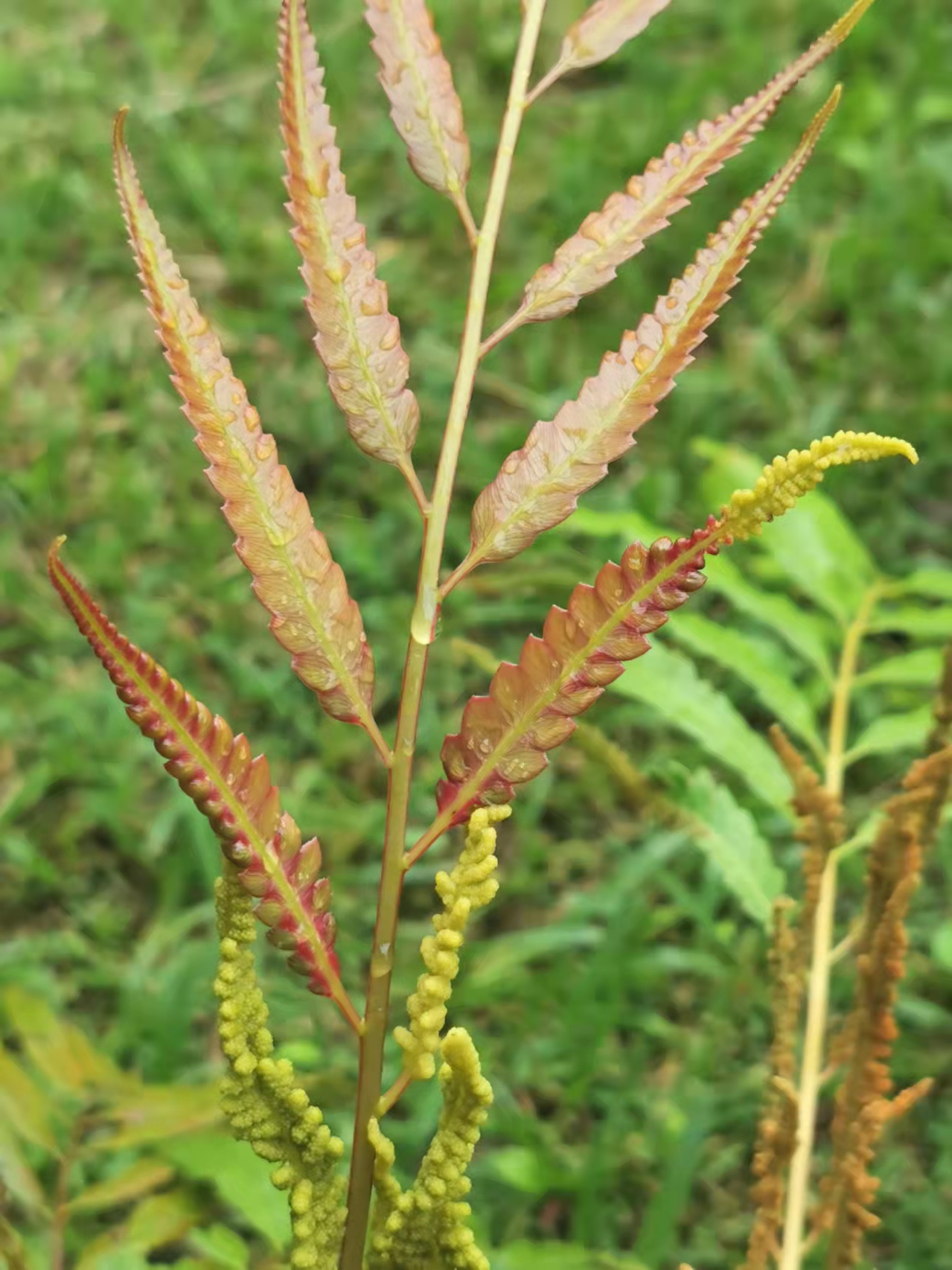
Young frond

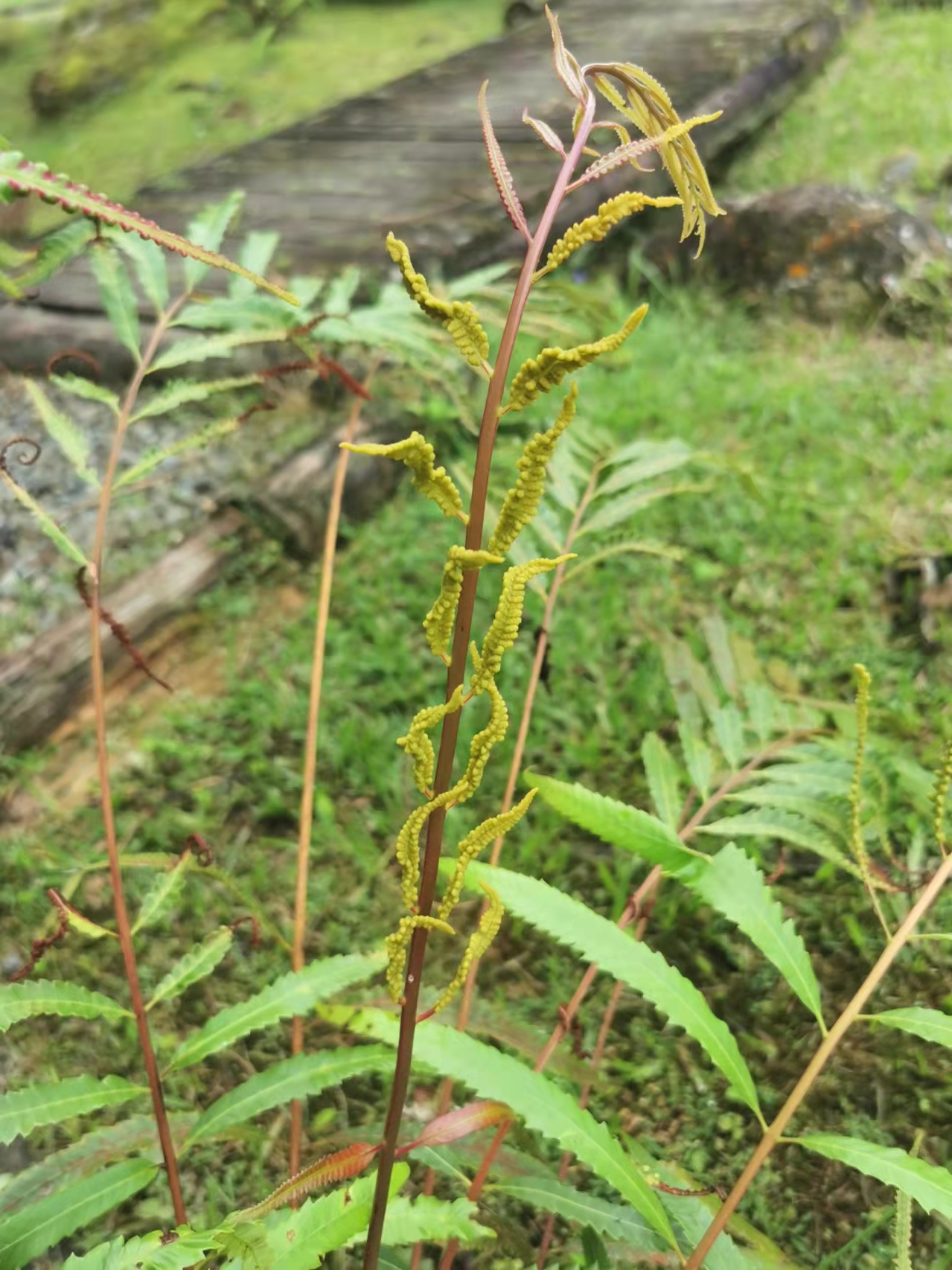
Young frond

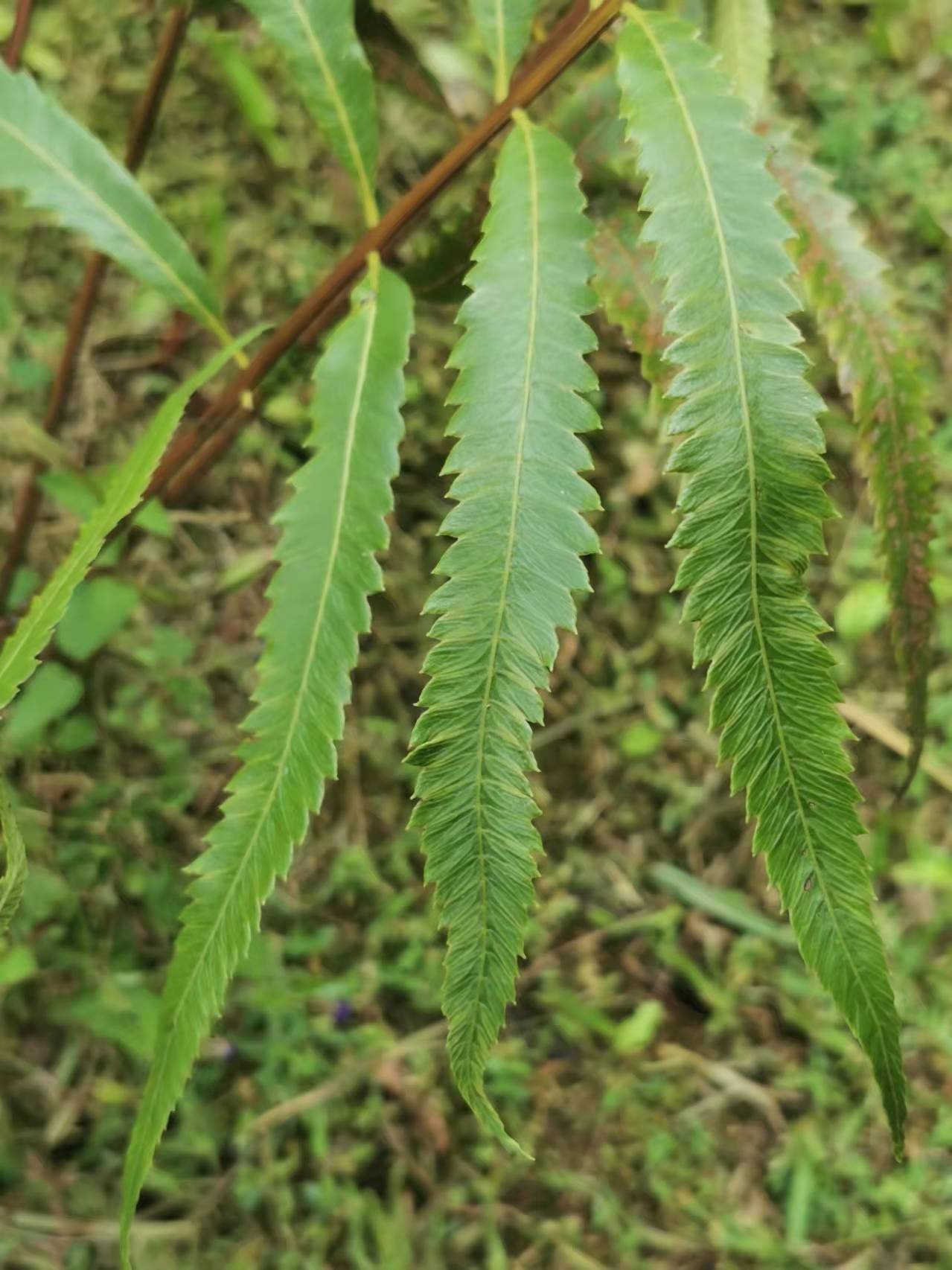
Vegetative pinnae

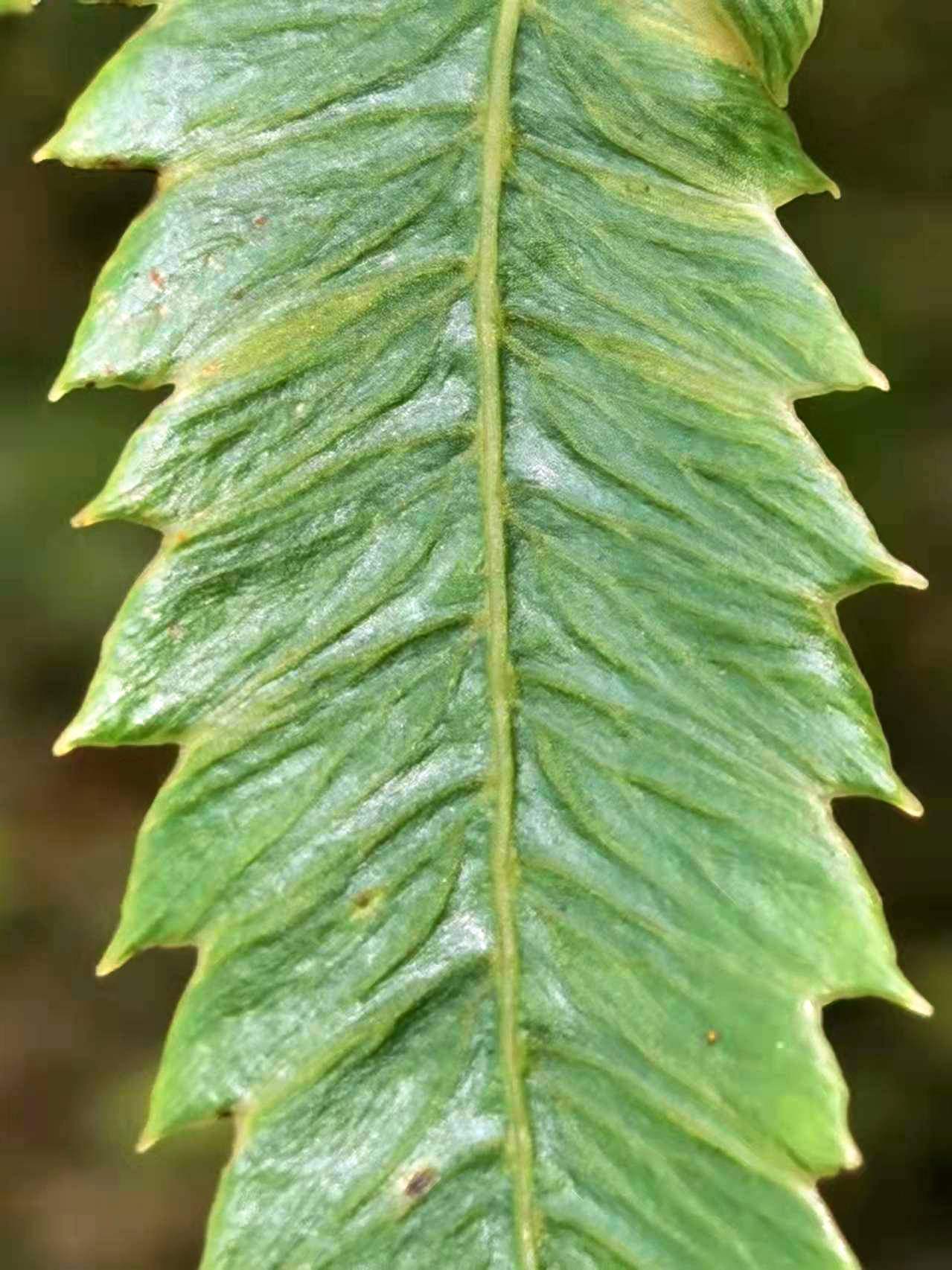
Veinlets forked

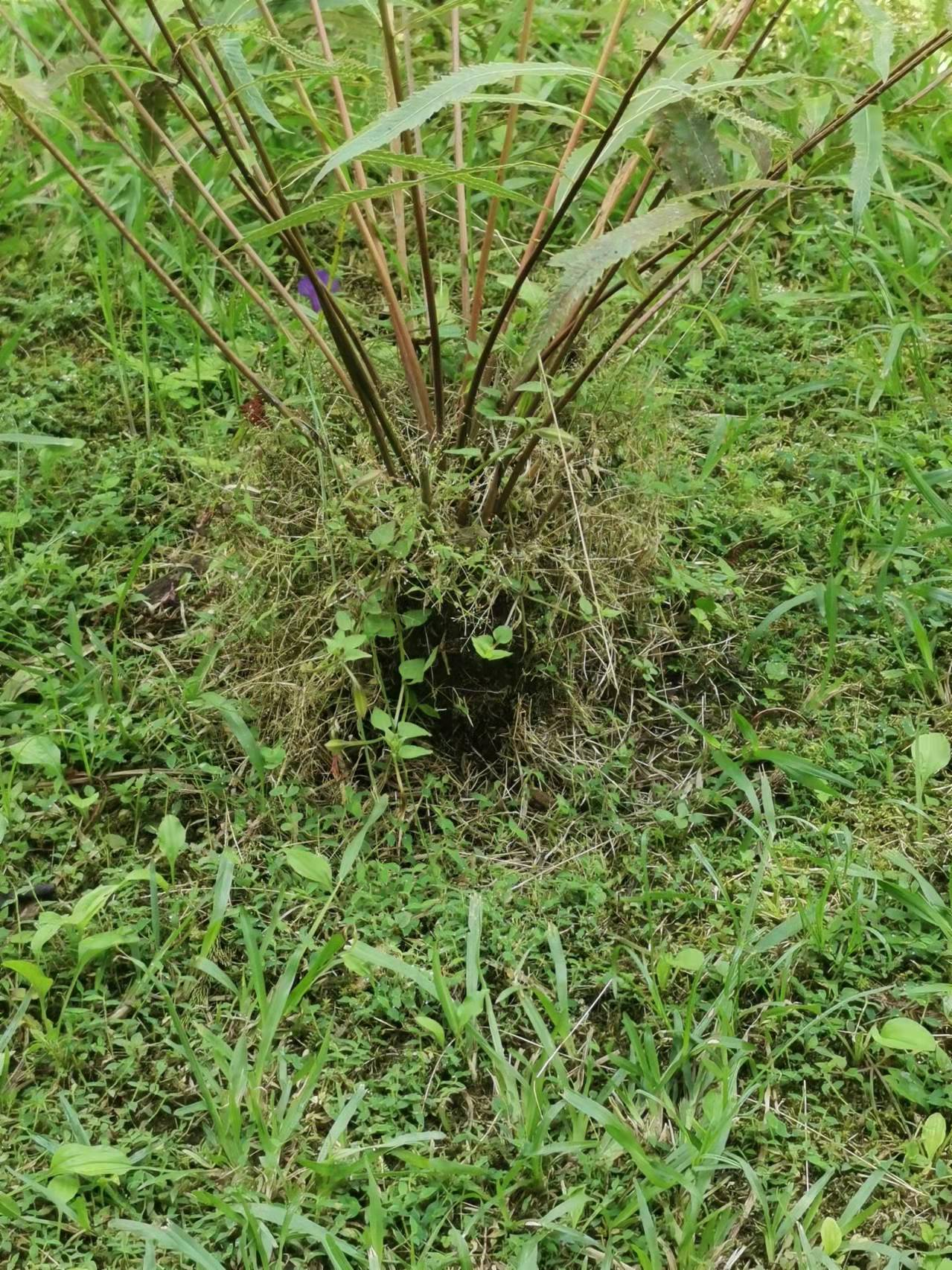
Rhizome

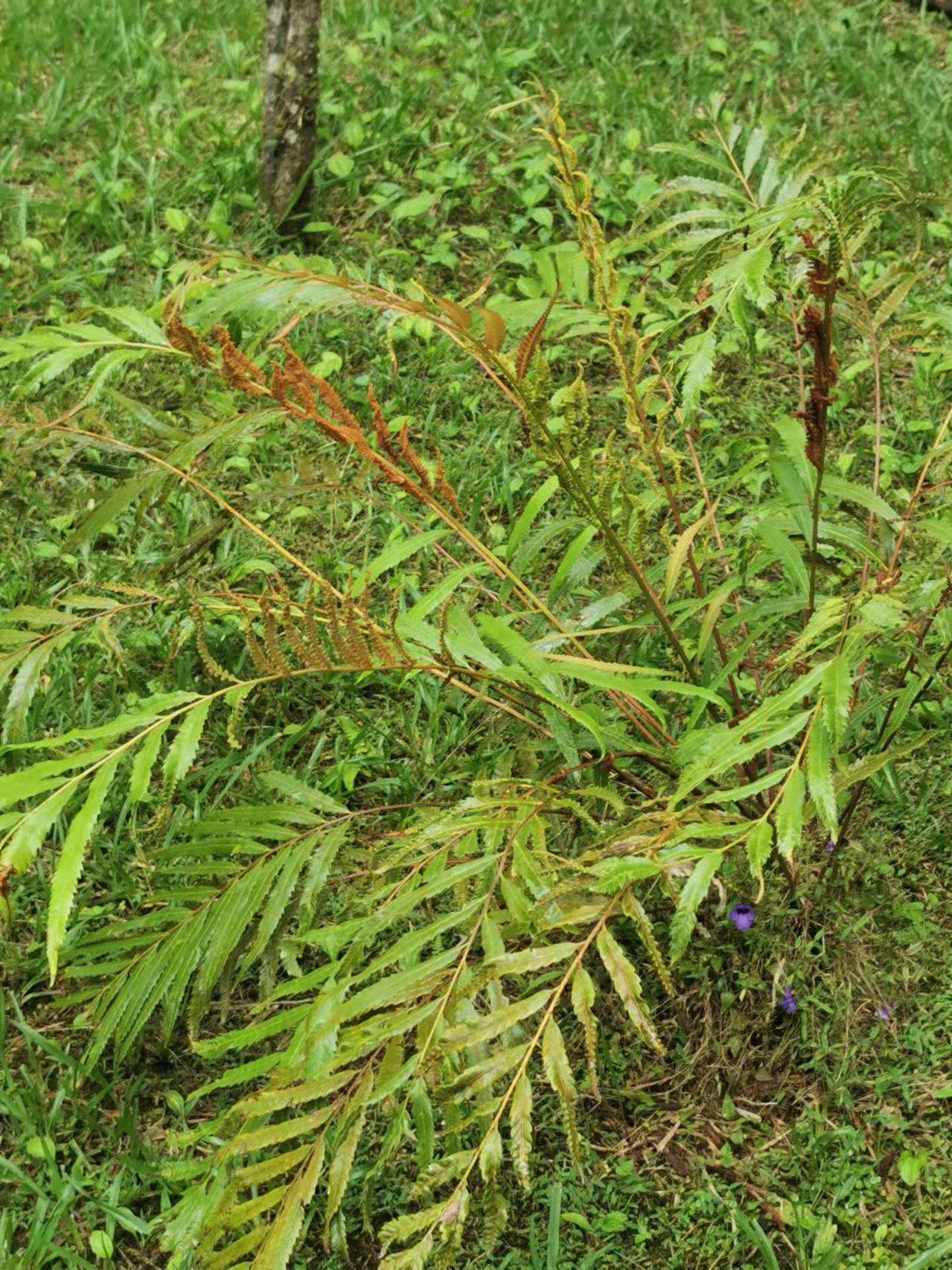
Plant
