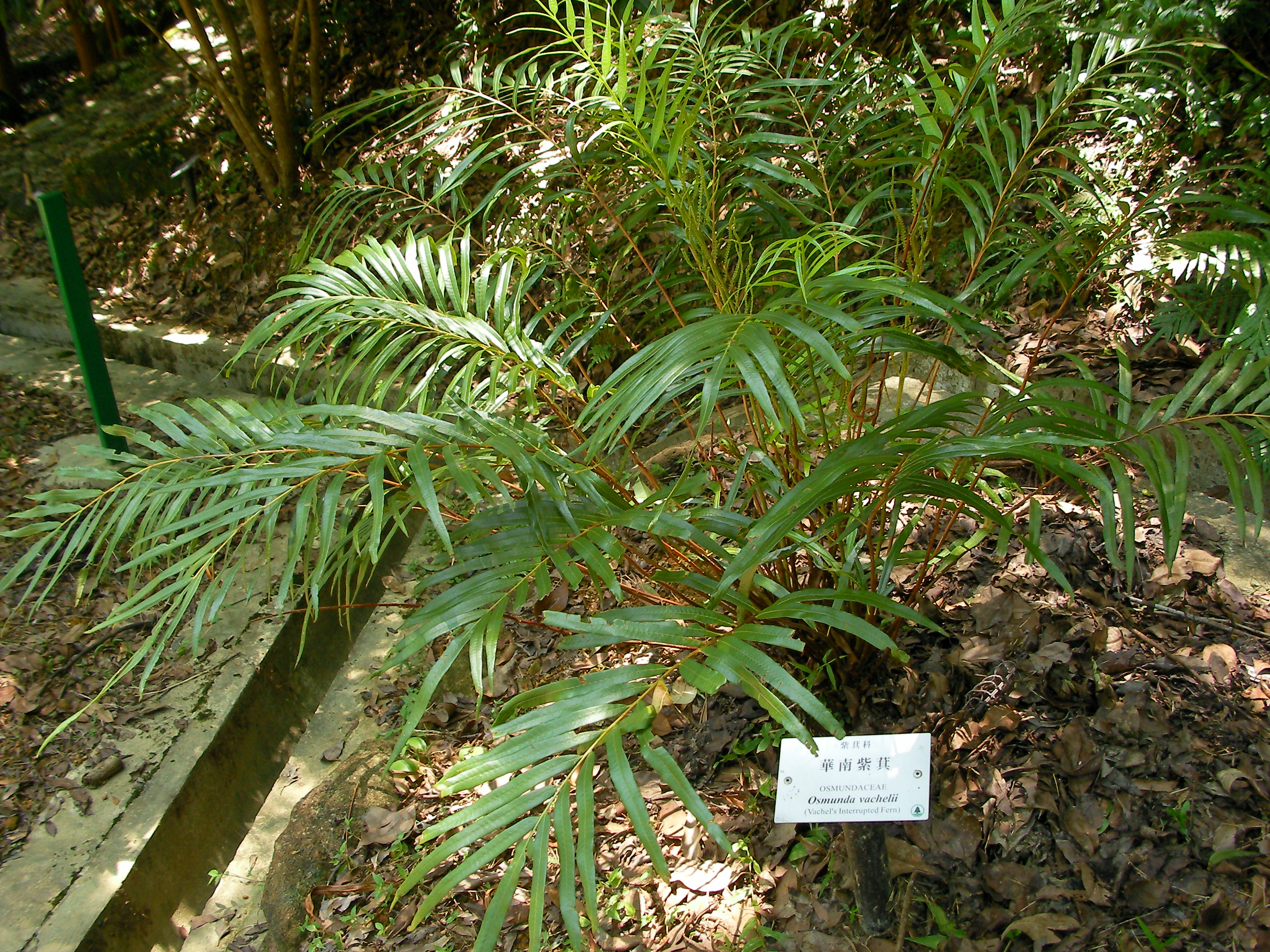

Scientific classification
- Kingdom: Plantae
- Clade: Tracheophytes
- Division: Polypodiophyta
- Class: Polypodiopsida
- Order: Osmundales
- Family: Osmundaceae
- Genus: Plenasium
- Species: P. vachellii

Binomial name
- Plenasium vachellii (Hook.) C.Presl

Synonyms
- Osmunda vachellii Hook.

= Plenasium vachellii =

Species of fern

Plenasium vachellii is a fern in the family Osmundaceae. The genus Plenasium is recognized in the Pteridophyte Phylogeny Group classification of 2016 (PPG I); however, some sources place all Plenasium species in a more broadly defined Osmunda, treating this species as Osmunda vachellii. It is native to south-central and southeast China (including Hainan) and Indochina (the Malayan peninsula, Myanmar, Thailand and Vietnam).
