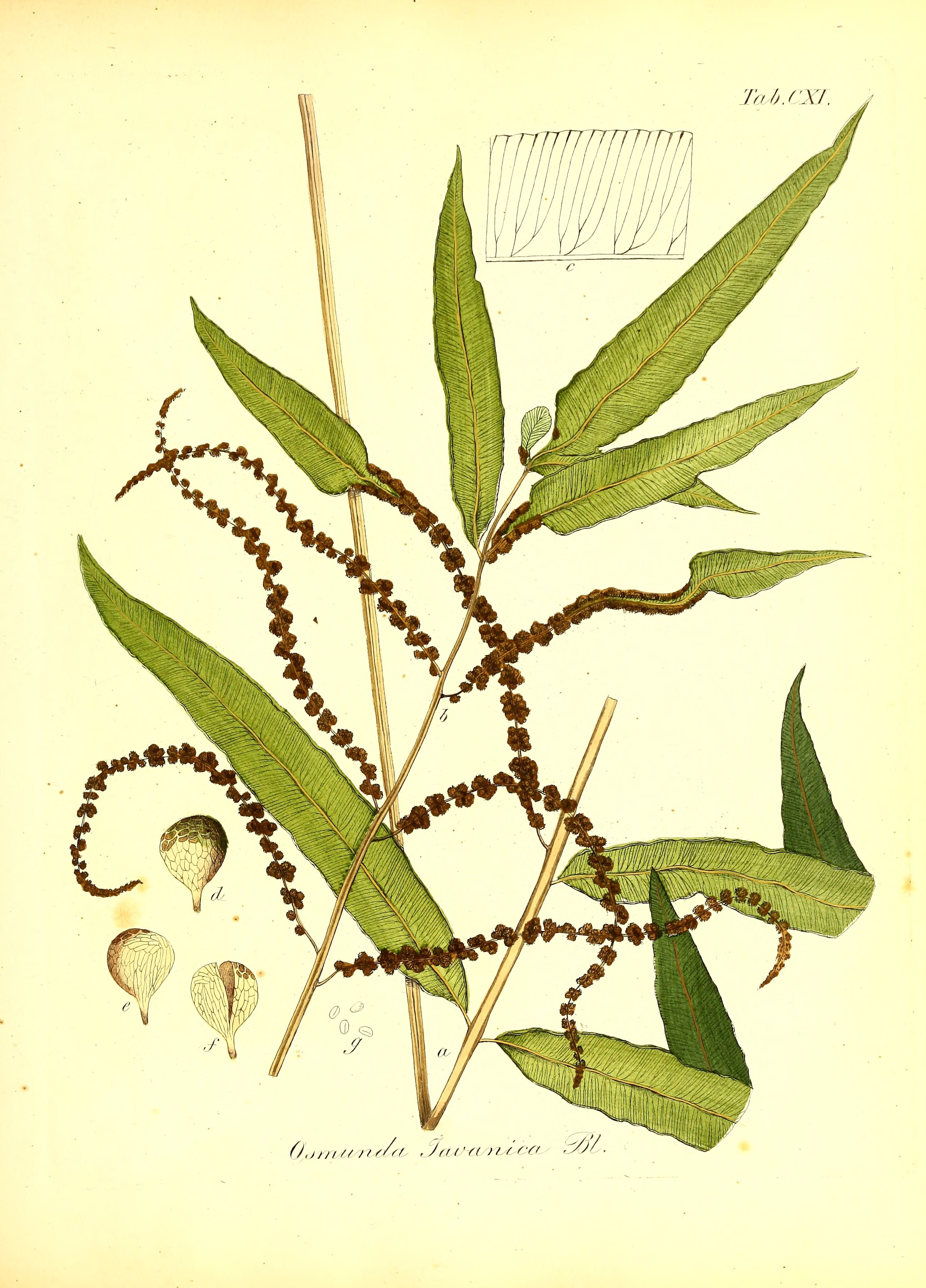

Scientific classification
- Kingdom: Plantae
- Clade: Tracheophytes
- Division: Polypodiophyta
- Class: Polypodiopsida
- Order: Osmundales
- Family: Osmundaceae
- Genus: Plenasium
- Species: P. javanicum

Binomial name
- Plenasium javanicum (Blume) C.Presl

Synonyms
- Osmunda javanica Blume

= Plenasium javanicum =

Species of fern

Plenasium javanicum is a fern in the family Osmundaceae. The genus Plenasium is recognized in the Pteridophyte Phylogeny Group classification of 2016 (PPG I); however, some sources place all Plenasium species in a more broadly defined Osmunda, treating this species as Osmunda javanica. It has a wide native distribution in south-eastern Asia, being found in the Eastern Himalaya, south-central and south east China (including Hainan), Indochina, the Philippines, Borneo, Sumatra, Sulawesi and Java.
