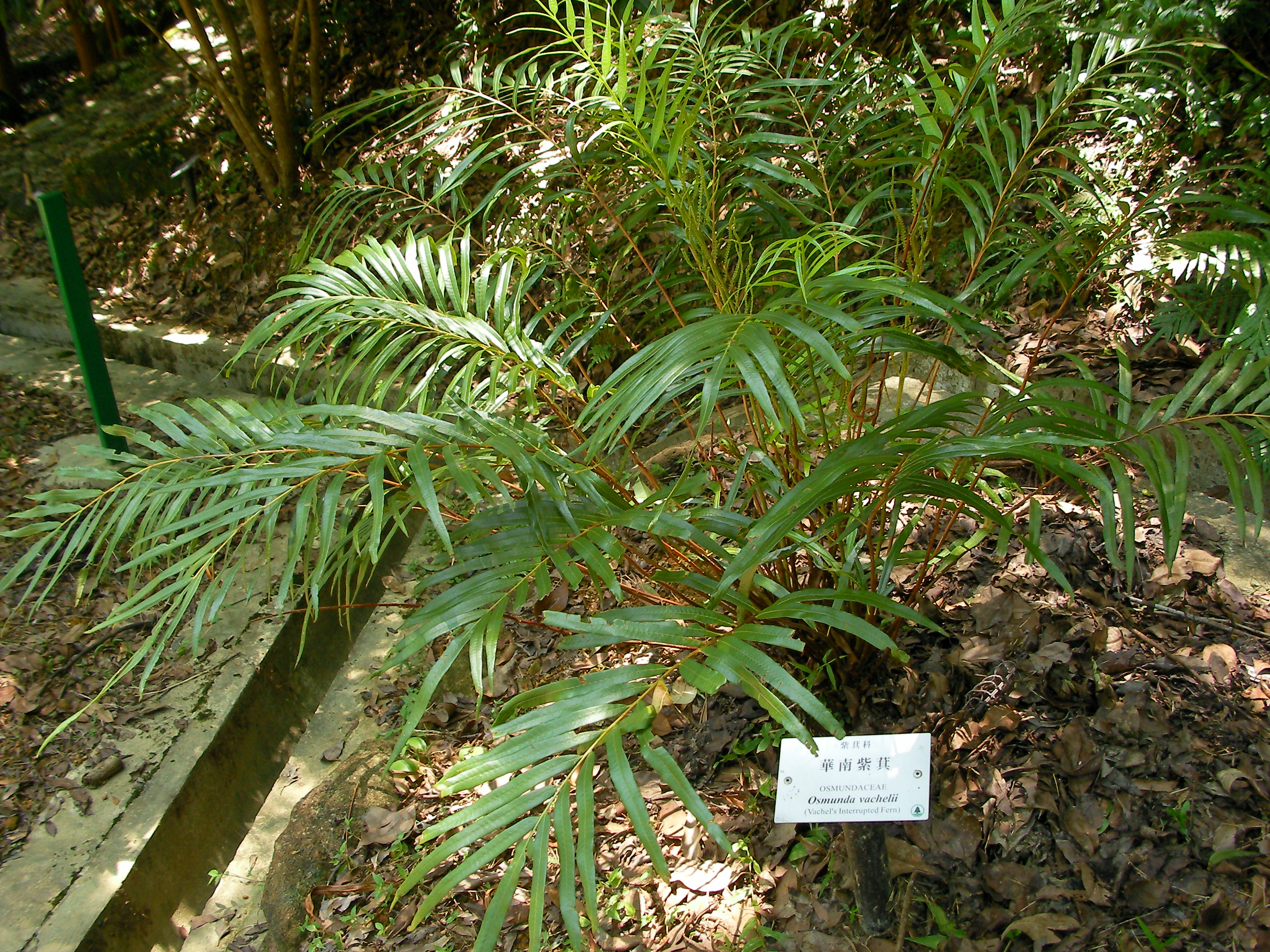
- Plenasium vachellii (syn. Osmunda vachellii) in the Shing Mun Arboretum, Hong Kong

Scientific classification
- Kingdom: Plantae
- Clade: Tracheophytes
- Division: Polypodiophyta
- Class: Polypodiopsida
- Order: Osmundales
- Family: Osmundaceae
- Genus: Plenasium; C.Presl

Type species
- Plenasium banksiifolium (Presl) Presl

Species
- See text

Synonyms
- Aurealcaulis Tidwell & Parker 1987; ×Osmunasium Liu, Schuettpelz & H.Schneid. 2020

= Plenasium =

Plenasium Temporal range: Early Cretaceous–Recent

Genus of ferns

Plenasium is a genus of ferns in the family Osmundaceae. It is recognized in the Pteridophyte Phylogeny Group classification of 2016 (PPG I), but kept within a more broadly circumscribed genus Osmunda by other sources. The genus is known from Early Cretaceous to present.

== Taxonomy ==
As of October 2026, the Checklist of Ferns and Lycophytes of the World and World Flora Online both recognize four species in Plenasium. Plants of the World Online recognizes the same species as part of a more broadly circumscribed Osmunda.

Phylogeny of Plenasium

- - Plenasium angustifolium (Ching) A.E.Bobrov
  - - ×Osmunasium ×mildei (Christensen) Liu, Schuettpelz & H.Schneid.
    - - Plenasium vachellii (Hook.) C.Presl
      - - Plenasium banksiifolium (C.Presl) C.Presl
        - Plenasium javanicum (Blume) C.Presl

The following fossil species are also accepted.

- †P. arnoldii (C.N.Mill. 1967) Bomfleur, Grimm & McLoughlin 2017
- †P. bransonii (Tidwell & Medlyn, 1991) Bomfleur, Grimm & McLoughlin 2017 (?Eocene: New Mexico, USA).
- †P. burgii (Tidwell & J.E.Skog, 2002) Bomfleur, Grimm & McLoughlin 2017 (Early Cretaceous: Nebraska, USA).
- †P. chandleri (Arnold 1952) Bomfleur, Grimm & McLoughlin
- †P. crossii (Tidwell & L.R.Parker, 1987) Bomfleur, Grimm & McLoughlin 2017 (Paleocene: Wyoming, USA).
- †P. dakotense (Tidwell & J.E.Skog, 2002) Bomfleur, Grimm & McLoughlin 2017 (Early Cretaceous: South Dakota, USA).
- †P. dowkeri (Carruthers 1870) Bomfleur, Grimm & McLoughlin 2017
- †P. moorei (Tidwell & Medlyn, 1991) Bomfleur, Grimm & McLoughlin 2017 (?Eocene: New Mexico, USA).
- †P. nebraskense (Tidwell & J.E.Skog, 2002) Bomfleur, Grimm & McLoughlin 2017 (Early Cretaceous: Nebraska, USA).
- †P. (Aurealcaulis) elegans Hiller et al. 2019 (Eocene, Vietnam)
- †P. (Plenasium) xiei Cheng et al. 2019 (Late Cretaceous, Northeastern China)
