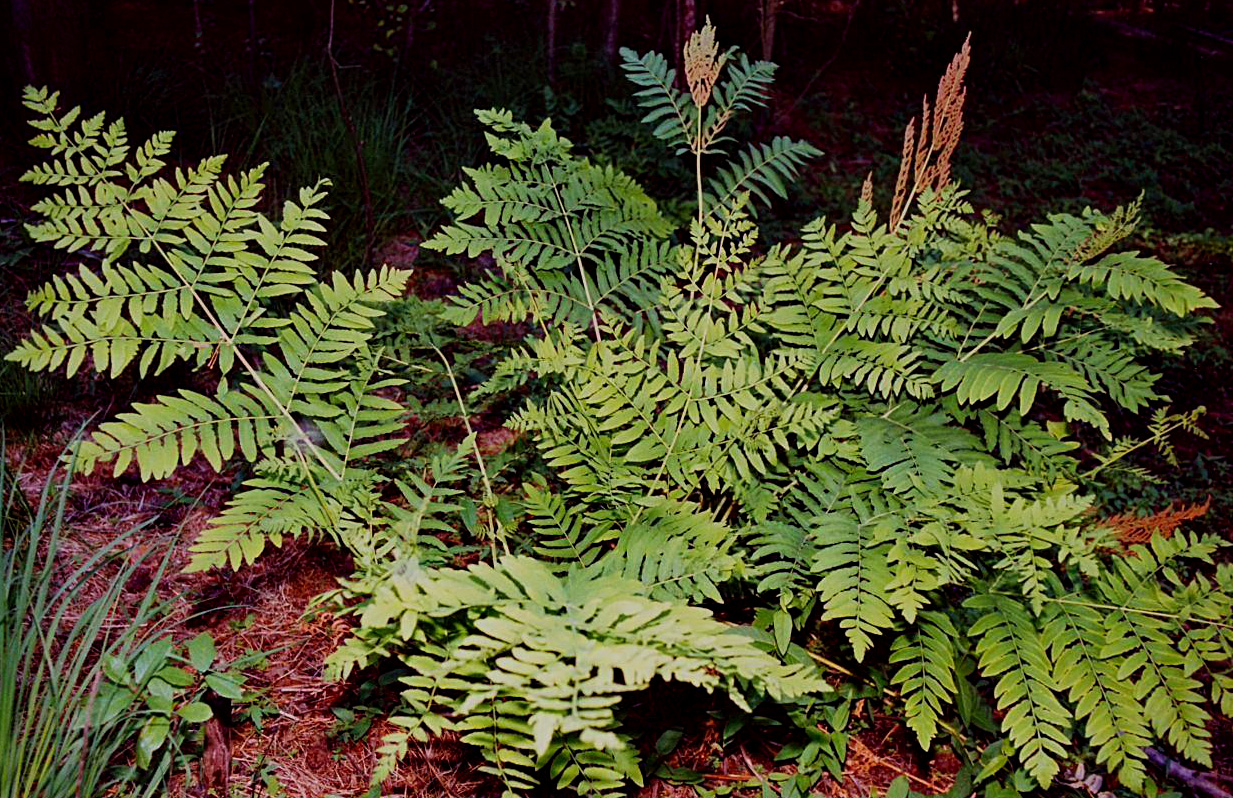
- Osmunda regalis

Scientific classification
- Kingdom: Plantae
- Clade: Tracheophytes
- Division: Polypodiophyta
- Class: Polypodiopsida
- Subclass: Polypodiidae
- Order: Osmundales; Link
- Family: Osmundaceae; Martinov

Type genus
- Osmunda L.

Genera
- Claytosmunda; Leptopteris; Osmunda; Osmundastrum; Plenasium; Todea; †Thamnopteris; †Chasmatopteris; †Osmundacaulis; †Palaeosmunda; †Millerocaulis; †Aurealcaulis; †Todites; †Anomopteris; †Osmundacidites; †Osmundites; †Osmundopsis; †Zhongmingella

= Osmundaceae =

Osmundaceae Temporal range: Late Permian–Recent

Family of ferns

Osmundaceae (royal fern family) is a family of ferns containing four to six extant genera and 18–25 known species. It is the only living family of the order Osmundales in the class Polypodiopsida (ferns) or in some classifications the only order in the class Osmundopsida. This is an ancient (known from the Upper Permian) and fairly isolated group that is often known as the "flowering ferns" because of the striking aspect of the ripe sporangia in Claytosmunda, Osmunda, Osmundastrum, and Plensium (subtribe Osmundinae). In these genera the sporangia are borne naked on non-laminar pinnules, while Todea and Leptopteris (subtribe Todinae) bear sporangia naked on laminar pinnules. Ferns in this family are larger than most other ferns.

== Description ==
The stems of Osmundaceae contain vascular tissue arranged as an ectophloic siphonostele; that is, a ring of phloem occurs on the outside only of a ring of xylem, which surrounds pith (and no other vascular tissue). Stipules can be discerned at the leaf bases of these ferns. The hardened leaf bases are persistent and overlap to form a hardened layer surrounding the stem. The mantle of sclerenchymatous leaf bases and intermixed roots can form a woody trunk when the stem emerges above ground, up to 1 meter (3.3 ft) in Todea barbara. Extinct members of the family, which flourished during the Mesozoic, could reach the stature of trees and be termed tree ferns. The leaves are either holodimorphic, with separate fertile and sterile fronds assuming an entirely different structure, or have fertile and sterile portions of the frond very distinct in structure.

Sporangia in the Osmundaceae are large, and open at a slit on the top; the annulus that drives the sporangium opening is on the side. 128 to 512 spores are typically present. The spores are green, nearly round, and trilete. The spores germinate into gametophytes, which are green (photosynthetic) and grow at the surface. They are large and heart-shaped. The base chromosome number for members of the order is 22.

== Taxonomy ==
Smith et al. (2006) carried out the first higher-level pteridophyte classification published in the molecular phylogenetic era, creating four classes of ferns (Polypodiopsida). At that time they used the term Polypodiopsida sensu stricto to apply to the largest of these. Later the term Polypodiopsida sensu lato was used to refer to all four subclasses, and the large subclass renamed Polypodiidae. This is also referred to informally as the leptosporangiate ferns. The Polypodiidae contain seven orders whose phylogenic relationship is shown in the following cladogram, where Osmundales is seen as a sister to all other members of the subclass.

- **Polypodiidae**
  - **Osmundales**
  - - Hymenophyllales
    - - Gleicheniales
      - - Schizaeales
        - - Salviniales
          - - Cyatheales
            - Polypodiales

=== Subdivision ===
In the Pteridophyte Phylogeny Group classification (2016) Osmundales consists of the single family Osmundaceae, six genera, and an estimated 18 species (Christenhusz and Byng give 25 species).

The three genera Osmunda, Leptopteris, and Todea were recognized as members of Osmundaceae by Smith et al. (2006) Of these, the largest genus, Osmunda, had traditionally been treated as three subgenera, Osmunda (3 species), Osmundastrum (2 species), and Plenasium (3–4 species). However, there was suspicion that the genus was not monophyletic.

The first molecular phylogeny showed that Osmunda as traditionally circumscribed was paraphyletic and that Osmunda cinnamomea, despite its morphological similarity to Osmunda claytoniana, was sister to the rest of the family. This was later confirmed by a detailed species-level phylogeny of the family by Metzgar et al. (2008) leading to the resurrection of the segregate genus Osmundastrum, by elevating it from subgenus, to contain it and render Osmunda monophyletic. Todea and Leptopteris are consistently resolved as sister groups, and Osmunda was found to contain three separate subclades corresponding to subgenera (now genera) Osmunda, Plenasium, and the recently described Claytosmunda with the single species, Osmunda claytoniana.

The following phylogram shows the relationship between the Osmundaceae genera and subtaxa, according to Metzgar et al.:

- **Osmundaceae**
  - Osmundastrum (=Osmunda cinnamomea) 1 extant species
  - - - Todea 2 extant species
      - Leptopteris 6 extant species
    - Osmunda
      - subgenus Claytosmunda (=Osmunda claytoniana) 1 species
      - - subgenus Plenasium 4 extant species
        - subgenus Osmunda 4 extant species

The circumscription of the order and its families was not changed, and its placement remained the same in subsequent classifications including Chase and Reveal (2009), Christenhusz et al. (2011), and Christenhusz and Chase (2014). The find of an exceptionally well preserved Jurassic fossil intermediate between genus Osmunda (as shown above) and Osmundastrum lead to a re-analysis of Metzgar et al.'s data, which revealed that the Osmundaceae root used above may be wrong and a tree-branching artefact (all other ferns are genetically very distant from the Osmundaceae), and allowing the following classification:

- **Osmundaceae**
  - - - Todea
      - Leptopteris
  - Osmunda
    - subgenus Osmundastrum
    - - subgenus Claytosmunda
      - - subgenus Plenasium
        - subgenus Osmunda

A molecular dating study using Metzgar et al.'s data and a comprehensive set of rhizome and leaf fossils estimated that (sub)generic differentiation within Osmundaceae started by the Triassic and was finished by the Early Cretaceous with the formation of Osmunda and Plenasium. Accordingly, the PPG I classification of 2016 continues to place Osmundales in Polypodiidae, but splits Osmunda further by elevating its subgenera to genera (Claytosmunda, Plenasium). The following cladogram reproduces the PPG I concept for the extant members of the family:

- **Osmundaceae**
  - Osmundastrum (Alternative A: outgroup-inferred root in multigene trees)
  - - - Todea
      - Leptopteris
    - - Osmundastrum (Alternative B)
      - - Claytosmunda (=Osmunda claytoniana)
        - - Plenasium 4 species
          - Osmunda 4 species

The new system was used in a comprehensive taxonomic evaluation of Osmundales rhizome fossils, who provide a polytomous key using anatomical features of Osmundaceae rhizomes and an updated 'evolutionary' (non-cladistic) classification of fossil and extant Osmundales (see classification concepts for groups including extinct members), which can be tentatively transferred into the following cladogram (monophyla in bold, polytomies reflect unresolved relationships)

- **Osmundales**
  - Bathypteris † monotypic, Late Permian
  - **Guaireaceae** †
    - **Guaireoideae** †
      - Guirea † mono- or paraphyletic with 2 species, Late Permian to Middle Triassic
      - Zhongmingella † monotypic, late Permian Changhsingian
      - Lunea † monotypic, Early Jurassic
    - Itopsidemoideae †
      - Donwelliacaulis † monotypic, Middle Triassic
      - Itopsidema (incl. Tiania) † 1–2 species, ?Late Permian to Middle Triassic
  - Osmundaceae
    - Anomorrhea † nomen dubium, Late Permian
    - Thamnopteroideae †
      - Thamnopteris † mono- or paraphyletic with 9 species, Late Permian
      - Chasmatopteris † monotypic, Late Permian
    - **Osmundoideae**
      - **Palaeosmunda** † 2–3 species, Late Permian to ?Late Triassic
      - Millerocaulis p.p.^{a} †
        - Millerocaulis p.p.^{a} † In total 29 species, Triassic to mid-Cretaceous
        - **Osmundeae** (modern Osmundaceae)
          - **Todeinae**
            - **Todea** 3 species, Early Cretaceous to present
            - **Leptopteris** possibly 5 species, ?Early Cretaceous to present
          - **Osmundinae**
            - **Osmundastrum** 4 (or more) species, Triassic to present
            - Claytosmunda ^{b}
              - Claytosmunda (Osmunda) claytoniana and potential precursors
              - - **Plenasium**
                  - Subgenus Aurealcaulis † likely paraphyletic with 6 species, Early Cretaceous to ?mid-Eocene
                  - 2 intermediate species from the Paleocene and Eocene
                  - Subgenus **Plenasium** 5 species, Paleocene to present
                - **Osmunda** 7 species, Paleocene to present
    - **Osmundacaulis** † 18 species, Jurassic to Cretaceous
    - Shuishengella † monotypic, Late Permian

Notes:
^{a}Millerocaulis is a likely paraphyletic genus that includes forms ancestral to the modern Osmundaceae (classified as Osmundeae) as well as their potential sister lineages.
^{b}The morphology of Claytosmunda is primitive within the Osmundinae, and total evidence indicates that Osmunda and Plenasium likely evolved from a Claytosmunda-type ancestor, rendering the latter genus paraphyletic when Osmundaceae fossil should be considered. The genus comprises 12 fossil rhizome species in addition to the sole surviving species.

The monophyly of Osmundaceae has faced recent challenges, with a study highlighting unresolved affinities among several taxa. Fossil-based phylogenetic inference presents two key difficulties: (1) fossil placements are often highly unstable (yielding ambiguous relationships), and (2) morphological characters exhibiting logical dependencies—which violates the assumption of data independence essential to phylogenetic and statistical methods.

Morphological phylogenetic analyses accounting for such dependencies recovered multiple fossils, traditionally considered outside Osmundaceae (e.g., Bathypteris), as nested within the family. Furthermore, several fossils assigned to Osmundoideae showed poorly resolved relationships, both with the Guaireaceae and other Osmundaceae members. Consequently, the monophyly of Osmundaceae itself—alongside the placement of incertae sedis fossils—remains a persistent and complex problem.

=== Evolution ===
Bomfleur et al. state that "Osmundales has arguably the richest and most informative fossil record of any extant group of ferns". The order is well represented in the fossil record from the Permian onwards. Osmundalean or potentially osmundalean fern foliage including Anomopteris Brongn., Todites Seward, Cladotheca T.Halle, Osmundopsis T.M.Harris, Cacumen Cantrill & J.A.Webb, Osmunda, Damudopteris D.D.Pant & P.K.Khare, Dichotomopteris Maithy, and Cladophlebis Brongn., is commonly found from the Permian onwards together with dispersed spores such as Osmundacidites Couper and Todisporites Couper. But their affinitity to the Osmundales, and Osmundaceae in particular, is difficult to judge. In the Triassic foliage becomes frequent which is similar to identical to the fronds of modern-day Todea, Osmundastrum and Claytosmunda. The better understood rhizome fossil record indicates that the group was most diverse in the Permian, and already much reduced in the Triassic regarding the number of substantially different forms (see Bomfleur et al. and literature cited therein).

The first fossil representatives of the modern Osmundaceae (= tribus Osmundeae) include rhizome fossils with Claytosmunda-anatomy or with structural features characteristic for Osmundastrum cinnomomeum and its precursors. The same holds for the equally old leaf fossil record of the group. The main diagnostic feature of Osmundeae (modern Osmundaceae) is a heterogenous sclerenchymatic ring in the stipe basis. This potential synapomorphy is the only character differentiating between Osmundeae and the paraphyletic genus collecting their potential early ancestors and sister lineages, Millerocaulis. The basic Bauplan shared with 'Millerocaulis' was generally kept within the Osmundeae-lineage and only slightly to moderately modified in the last 200 million years. Triassic-Jurassic rhizome and frond morphologies remained essentially unaltered in the lineage leading to Claytosmunda claytoniana. This makes it impossible to discern direct ancestors of C. claytoniana from the ancestors of its sister lineages Osmunda and Plenasium), or their shared ancestors. Molecular dating placed the split between Osmunda and Plenasium, and their divergence from Claytosmunda in the Early Cretaceous, co-eval with the divergence between the sister genera Todea and Leptopteris. The Osmundastrum-lineage diverged much earlier (probably Middle Triassic), which fits with the new classification of re-evaluated rhizome fossils originally included in Millercaulis. A comprehensive list of rhizome and leaf fossils associated with modern Osmundaceae (Osmundeae in the classification of Bomfleur et al.) can be found at datadryad.org.

The only explicit reconstruction regarding the evolution of morphological traits in Osmundaceae can be found in Charles Miller's groundbreaking work. Notable is that Permian rhizomes of both families in the Osmundales, the extinct Guaireaceae and the Osmundaceae including the extant species, show already relatively complex stele anatomies in comparison to the surviving members of the group. The rhizome fossil record also indicates several independent radiations of likely arborescent lineages, the Guaireaceae and Thamnopterioideae in the Permian, Osmundacaulis in the Triassic, and Plenasium (subgenus Aurealcaulis) in the late Cretaceous to Paleogene. As already noted by Miller, highly derived forms not directly related to the extant species and genera, can be found in the Jurassic and Cretaceous, such as Millerocaulis (Osmundacaulis) kolbii. Another general trend is that the Permian Osmundales were much larger than their modern counterparts. Today, the widespread species of Osmundaceae are rhizomatous with small, low-dissected steles.

Recently, Urrea et al. conducted total-evidence dating analyses of extant and fossil fertile Osmundaceae in which diversification was driven by global climatic events. More specifically, their analyses inferred a long-term extinction interval triggered by the Toarcian Oceanic Anoxic (TOA) event initiated during the Early Jurassic. A dramatic loss of morphological diversity was observed to be paralleled by such extinction interval. Urrea et al. suggest that high extinction rates, coupled with low morphological diversity, may have resulted in depauperate Antarctic populations that subsequently gave rise to extant Todea and Leptopteris.

== Bibliography ==
- Bomfleur, Benjamin; Grimm, Guido W.; McLoughlin, Steve (2015). "Osmunda pulchella [now: Osmundastrum pulchellum] sp. nov. from the Jurassic of Sweden—reconciling molecular and fossil evidence in the phylogeny of modern royal ferns (Osmundaceae)". BMC Evolutionary Biology. 15: 126. doi:10.1186/s12862-015-0400-7. PMC 4487210. PMID 26123220.
- Bomfleur, Benjamin; Grimm, Guido W.; McLoughlin, Steve (2017). "The fossil Osmundales (Royal Ferns)—a phylogenetic network analysis, revised taxonomy, and evolutionary classification of anatomically preserved trunks and rhizomes". PeerJ. 5 e3433: e3443. doi:10.7717/peerj.3433. PMC 5508817. PMID 28713650.
- Chase, Mark W.; Reveal, James L. (2009). "A phylogenetic classification of the land plants to accompany APG III". Botanical Journal of the Linnean Society. 161 (2): 122–127. doi:10.1111/j.1095-8339.2009.01002.x.
- Christenhusz, M. J. M.; Zhang, X. C.; Schneider, H. (18 February 2011). "A linear sequence of extant families and genera of lycophytes and ferns". Phytotaxa. 19 (1): 7. Bibcode:2011Phytx..19....7C. doi:10.11646/phytotaxa.19.1.2.
- Christenhusz, Maarten J.M.; Chase, Mark W. (2014). "Trends and concepts in fern classification". Annals of Botany. 113 (4): 571–594. doi:10.1093/aob/mct299. PMC 3936591. PMID 24532607.
- Christenhusz, Maarten JM & Byng, J. W. (2016). "The number of known plants species in the world and its annual increase". Phytotaxa. 261 (3): 201–217. Bibcode:2016Phytx.261..201C. doi:10.11646/phytotaxa.261.3.1.
- Faull, J. H. (1901). "The anatomy of the Osmundaceae". Botanical Gazette. 32 (6): 381–420. doi:10.1086/328180. JSTOR 2465028.
- Grimm, Guido W.; Kapli, Pashalia; Bomfleur, Benjamin; McLoughlin, Steve; Renner, Susanne S. (2015). "Using more than the oldest fossils: Dating Osmundaceae with the fossilized birth-death process". Systematic Biology. 64 (3): 396–405. doi:10.1093/sysbio/syu108. PMID 25503771.
- Hoshizaki, Barbara Joe; Moran, Robbin C. (2001). Fern Grower's Manual. Portland, Oregon: Timber Press. ISBN 978-0-88192-495-4.
- Lehtonen, Samuli (2011). "Towards Resolving the Complete Fern Tree of Life". PLoS ONE. 6 (10) e24851. Bibcode:2011PLoSO...624851L. doi:10.1371/journal.pone.0024851. PMC 3192703. PMID 22022365.
- Metzgar, Jordan S.; Skog, Judith E.; Zimmer, Elizabeth A.; Pryer, Kathleen M. (1 March 2008). "The Paraphyly of Osmunda is Confirmed by Phylogenetic Analyses of Seven Plastid Loci". Systematic Botany. 33 (1): 31–36. Bibcode:2008SysBo..33...31M. doi:10.1600/036364408783887528. S2CID 6180706.
- Miller, Charles N. (1971), Evolution of the Fern Family Osmundaceae Based on Anatomical Studies, Museum of Paleontology, University of Michigan
- Moran, Robbin C. (2004). A Natural History of Ferns. Portland, Oregon: Timber Press, Inc. ISBN 978-1-60469-062-0.
- Pryer, Kathleen M.; Schneider, Harald; Smith, Alan R.; Cranfill, Raymond; Wolf, Paul G.; Hunt, Jeffrey S.; Sipes, Sedonia D. (2001). "Horsetails and ferns are a monophyletic group and the closest living relatives to seed plants". Nature. 409 (6820): 618–622. Bibcode:2001Natur.409..618S. doi:10.1038/35054555. PMID 11214320. S2CID 4367248.
- Pteridophyte Phylogeny Group (November 2016). "A community-derived classification for extant lycophytes and ferns". Journal of Systematics and Evolution. 54 (6): 563–603. Bibcode:2016JSyEv..54..563.. doi:10.1111/jse.12229. S2CID 39980610.
- Ranker, Tom A.; Haufler, Christopher H., eds. (2008). Biology and Evolution of Ferns and Lycophytes. Cambridge University Press. ISBN 978-0-521-87411-3.
- Schneider, Harald; Smith, Alan R.; Pryer, Kathleen M. (1 July 2009). "Is Morphology Really at Odds with Molecules in Estimating Fern Phylogeny?". Systematic Botany. 34 (3): 455–475. Bibcode:2009SysBo..34..455S. doi:10.1600/036364409789271209. S2CID 85855934.
- Smith, Alan R.; Kathleen M. Pryer; Eric Schuettpelz; Petra Korall; Harald Schneider; Paul G. Wolf (2006). "A classification for extant ferns" (PDF). Taxon. 55 (3): 705–731. Bibcode:2006Taxon..55..705S. doi:10.2307/25065646. JSTOR 25065646.
- Smith, Alan R.; Pryer, Kathleen M.; Schuettpelz, Eric; Korall, Petra; Schneider, Harald; Wolf, Paul G. (9 December 2024). Fern classification (PDF). pp. 417–467., in Ranker & Haufler (2008)
- C.Michael Hogan. 2010. Fern. Encyclopedia of Earth. National council for Science and the Environment. Washington, DC
- Jud, Nathan, Gar W. Rothwell, and Ruth A. Stockey (2008). "Todea from the Lower Cretaceous of western North America: implications for the phylogeny, systematics, and evolution of modern Osmundaceae." American Journal of Botany, 95:330-339.
- Thomas N. Taylor, Edith L. Taylor, Michael Krings: Paleobotany. The Biology and Evolution of Fossil Plants . Second Edition, Academic Press 2009, ISBN 978-0-12-373972-8, p. 437-443
- Wang, S. J.; Hilton, J.; He, X. Y.; Seyfullah, L. J.; Shao, L. (2014). "The anatomically preserved Zhongmingella gen. nov. from the Upper Permian of China: evaluating the early evolution and phylogeny of the Osmundales". Journal of Systematic Palaeontology. 1: 1–22. doi:10.1080/14772019.2012.726658. S2CID 84125204.
- Yatabe, Y.; Nishida, H.; Murakami, N. (1999). "Phylogeny of Osmundaceae inferred from rbcL nucleotide sequences and comparison to the fossil evidences". Journal of Plant Research. 112 (4): 397–404. Bibcode:1999JPlR..112..397Y. doi:10.1007/pl00013894. S2CID 24842881.
