= Djupadal Formation =

Geologic formation in Skåne County, Sweden

- Stratigraphic range: Pliensbachian-Toarcian; ~184–175 Ma A Volcanic neck suggest 176.7 ± 0.5 Ma, Late Toarcian Age
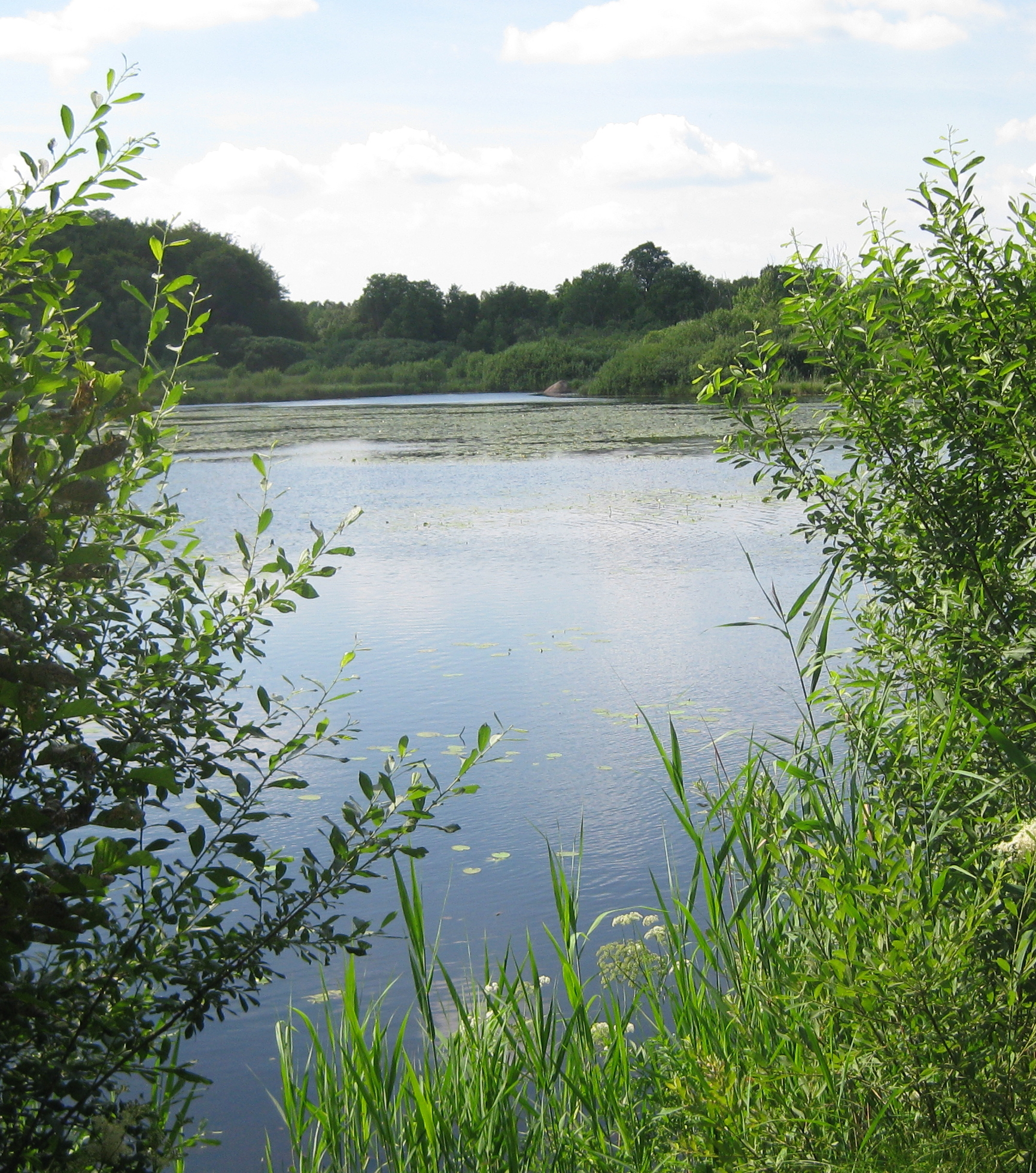
- About 10 m south of the shore of the Korsaröd lake exposed layers of the unit are known
- Type: Formation
- Unit of: Central Skåne Volcanic Province
- Sub-units: (in part) Sapropel at Sandåkra
- Underlies: Cuaternary Sediments
- Overlies: Höör Sandstone, Brandsberga and Kolleberga erratics and (in part) Sapropel at Sandåkra
- Thickness: Up to 60 m (200 ft)

Lithology
- Primary: Basalt Tuff, Veined Gneiss
- Other: Sandstone, Clay and Conglomerate

Location
- Coordinates: 55.98°N 13.63°E
- Approximate paleocoordinates: Approx. 35°N
- Region: Central Skåne County
- Country: Sweden
- Extent: 1,000 km^{2} (390 sq mi)

Type section
- Named for: Djupadalsmölla, Ljungbyhed
- Named by: Carita Augustsson
- Year defined: 2001
- Djupadal Formation (Sweden) Korsaröd Lagerstätten Location

The Djupadal Formation is a geologic formation in Skåne County, southern Sweden. It is Early Jurassic (probably Pliensbachian-Toarcian, or Late Toarcian) in age. It is part of the Central Skåne Volcanic Province, know by the discovery of basalt tuff layers, including Sandåkra, Korsaröd and Djupadal. An original analysis of the location of Korsaröd led to a Toarcian-Aalenian age, but was dismissed in 2016, when a series of Palynogical samples recovered a Late Pliensbachian and probably Lower Toarcian age for the Korsaröd Outcrop. The same year this result was also challenged by an in-depth study of the Lilla Hagstad neck that yield a Late Toarcian Age. The formation was deposited in the Central Skane region, linked to the late early Jurassic volcanism. The Korsaröd member includes a volcanic-derived Lagerstatten with exceptional fern finds. The data provided by fossilized wood rings showed that the location of Korsaröd hosted a middle-latitude Mediterranean-type biome in the late Early Jurassic, with low rainfall ratio, delayed to seasonal events. Superimposed on this climate were the effects of a local active Strombolian Volcanism and hydrothermal activity.

== Description ==
Djupadalsmölla is a geological site in southern Sweden, notable for its volcanic tuff and related rock types formed from ancient volcanic activity. First documented in 1826, the site contains basalts from early volcanic eruptions. The Anneklev exposure near Höör revealed the first volcanic neck, with additional volcanic remnants at Jällabjär, Rallate, and Djupadalsmölla itself. The rocks here are primarily tuff, containing basaltic bombs with pyroxene, olivine pseudomorphs, and occasional conifer wood fragments ranging from small pieces to large logs. The Rönne River has carved a 20-meter-deep valley through the Precambrian basement, exposing Lower Jurassic strata, including volcanic tuff, on the southern valley side. These strata extend northwest, suggesting the valley follows a partially exhumed sub-Jurassic depression. The valley floor includes modern sediments from a Late Weichselian meltwater channel and eroded fluvioglacial deposits. A nearby roadcut shows kaolinized basement beneath Toarcian sediments, and a borehole penetrated 44 meters of kaolinized gneiss. Small ridges, cupolas in gneiss, and tors in amphibolite are also visible at the valley bottom.

=== Geology ===
Geology of Sweden, showing the Precambrian-Paleozoic Basement and the Mesozoic limited to Skane

The Djupadalsmölla site lies within the Sorgenfrei-Tornquist Zone (STZ), a 20–60 km wide fracture zone in southern Sweden and the Baltic Sea, part of the larger Tornquist Lineament stretching over 1000 km from the North Sea to the Black Sea. This zone marks the boundary between the East European Craton and Early Paleozoic terranes of central Europe. The STZ formed through continental rifting from the Permian to Cretaceous, similar to the North Sea system, with complex horst and graben structures from Late Cretaceous–Paleogene tectonics. Rifting from the Carboniferous to Mesozoic, linked to the breakup of Pangea, led to mafic alkaline magmatism, including a 70 km wide Permo-Carboniferous tholeiitic dyke swarm across Scania and Bornholm. The Central Skåne Volcanic Province, a 30 by 40 km Mesozoic volcanic field, features around 100 volcanic plugs and necks forming steep hills in central Scania. This volcanism likely originated from a continental lithospheric mantle reservoir or edge-driven mantle convection.

=== Stratigraphy ===
The Djupadalsmölla pyroclastic deposit is up to 10 meters high and 20 meters wide, extending over 100 meters westward along the Rönne River valley. It consists of a 3-meter-thick Jurassic sequence overlying kaolinized Paleozoic gneiss, starting with 2 meters of sandstone and claystone, topped by 1 meter of green-brownish tuffaceous rocks. The tuff contains mostly lapilli (30–50%) and ash, with some red patches and concretions of coarse ash, calcite, and wood fragments. The deposit suggests moderate explosivity, with short transport paths indicated by minimal mechanical weathering, thick layering, and few basaltic bombs. The presence of wood and lapilli points to terrestrial deposition, likely from Strombolian volcanism tied to a regional rift, as evidenced by over 100 volcanic necks in central Scania.

A borehole (KBH2) at Djupadalsmölla provides detailed stratigraphy. The crystalline basement is 6.32 meters of weathered red-whitish gneiss, transitioning to kaolinite at the top. The Jurassic strata include light to dark gray shale with a 30 cm silt/clay layer and coal, showing microfaults and volcanic fragments. The volcanic sequence, 19.50 meters thick, consists of lapilli tuff cemented by calcite or zeolite, with felsic xenoliths and accidental lithics. Four subunits include varying textures, cement types, and preserved wood, indicating a dynamic depositional environment.

Other nearby sites, like Karup, show 1–1.5-meter-thick pyroclastic layers with abundant charred and silicified wood. Koholma features 0.5 meters of green-brown tuff with large clasts and plant remains, likely from volcanic sliding flows. The Korsaröd Lagerstätte, a key outcrop, contains well-preserved fern fossils, linked to the Djupadal Formation and interpreted as a lahar deposit, comparable to modern Rotorua, New Zealand.

=== Lithology ===
The rocks at Djupadalsmölla are primarily volcanic tuff, composed of ash, sand, lapilli, and partially disintegrated basalt, with colors varying from blue-green to brown depending on weathering. The tuff contains rounded grains, from pea to hazelnut size, cemented mainly by limestone. Cavities are filled with secondary minerals like calcite, zeolites, and viridite, with cement consisting of limnic limestone and sandstone. The rocks are classified as either feldspar basalt or limburgite (glass basalt), containing augite, olivine, and minor magnetite and ferrite. The glass-like sections are porous, with olivine crystals and minor serpentine, cemented by limestone. Volcanic bombs include red gneiss and amphibolite, alongside mica diorite, limestone, clay slate, and shale sandstone, often containing wood fragments.

At Lilla Hagstad, the lithology includes nepheline basalt with a dark glass matrix containing nepheline, augite, olivine, and magnetite crystals. Rounded lapilli, from hazelnut to pea size, indicate subaerial eruption products. The KBH2 borehole reveals volcaniclastic grains with swelling clay minerals from degraded ash and lapilli, cemented by calcite, chlorite, zeolites, and iron-rich siderite. Siliclastic interbeds, rare and initially linked to the Höör Sandstone, include arkose sandstone with ripple marks and sandstone/claystone layers with coal and plant remains.

=== Age and Correlations ===
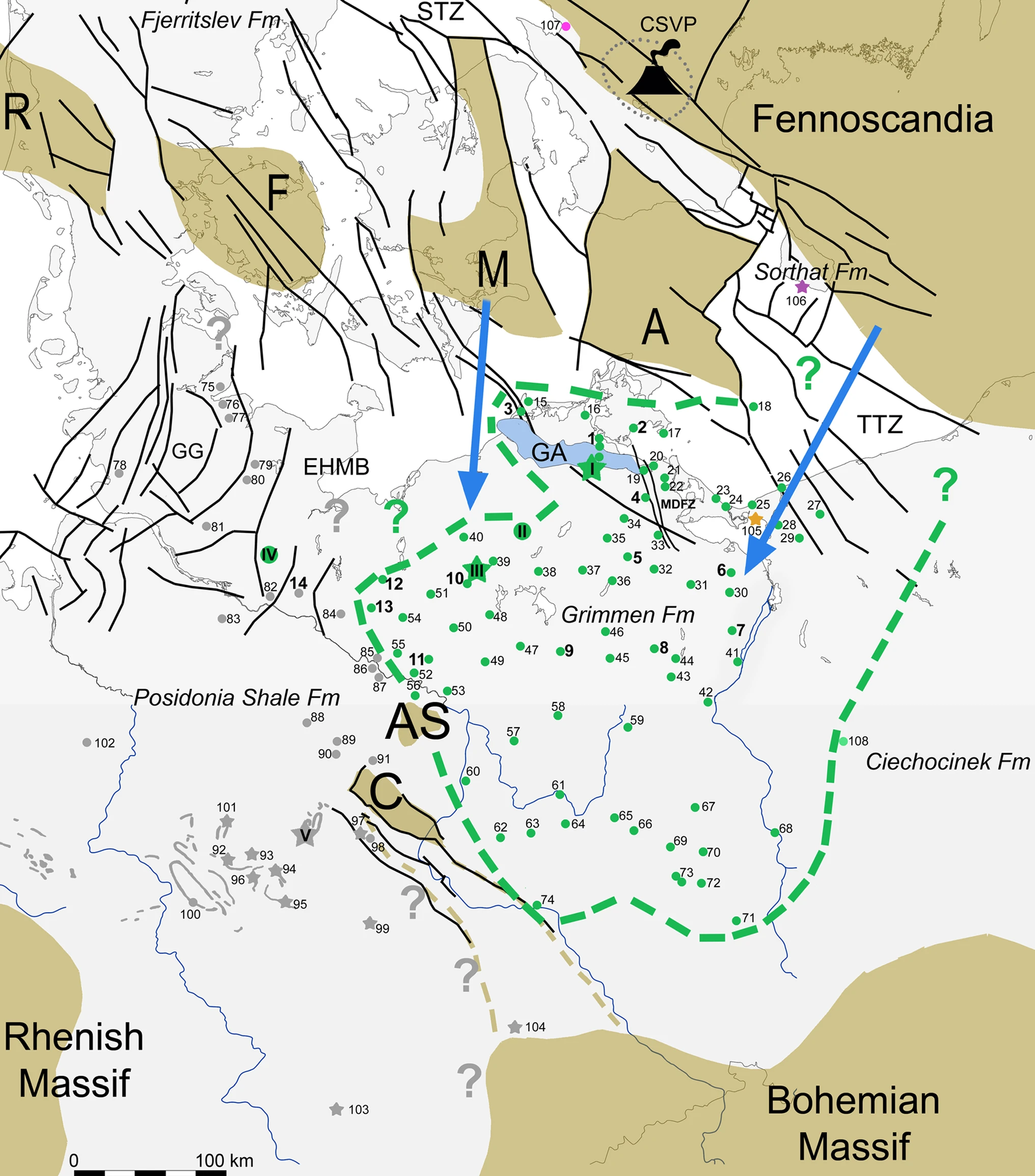
Simplified Paleogeography of the NGB in the Toarcian, with the extent of the Grimmen Formation and adjacent units, including the Skane Volcanics (marked with a Volcano)

The Djupadalsmölla deposits are dated to the Late Pliensbachian to Early Toarcian (approximately 184–176 Ma), based on palynology and radiometric data. A high-precision 40Ar/39Ar age of 176.7 ± 0.5 Ma from Lilla Hagstad confirms a Late Toarcian age. Earlier K–Ar dating yielded a range of 171–179 Ma, while 40Ar/39Ar analyses from volcanic plugs suggest 191–178 Ma. Palynological evidence from KBH2, including marine palynomorphs and specific pollen, supports a Latest Pliensbachian age. The formation overlies the Höör Sandstone and correlates with the Rydebäck and Katslösa members of the Rya Formation, the Röddinge Formation, and the Sorthat Formation in Denmark, sharing abundant fern-derived miospores. It also aligns with the Fjerritslev and Gassum Formations in the Danish and Øresund Basins. Volcanic material was transported by fluvial channels to the Green Series of Grimmen and Dobbertin (Grimmen Formation), with clays likely derived from weathered volcanic deposits. Erosion of the underlying Hettangian–Sinemurian Höör Sandstone contributed sands to the North German Basin.

=== Basin history ===
The Djupadalsmölla deposits formed within the Sorgenfrei-Tornquist Zone (STZ), part of the Trans-European Suture Zone separating Baltica from peri-Gondwanan terranes, active since the Late Ordovician (~445 Ma). At the Carboniferous–Permian boundary (~300 Ma), the Skagerrak-Centered Large Igneous Province influenced the region.

The basins of southern Sweden and eastern Denmark formed in the Late Triassic to Early Jurassic, coinciding with the Central Atlantic Magmatic Province (CAMP), the largest igneous province in Earth’s history. The Central Skåne Volcanic Province was active during the Pliensbachian to Toarcian (184–176 Ma), with Strombolian-style eruptions near Early Jurassic oceans. No correlative pyroclastic beds have been identified in surrounding basins. During the deposition of the Rya Formation’s Rydebäck Member, the Toarcian turnover caused widespread extinctions.

== Environment ==
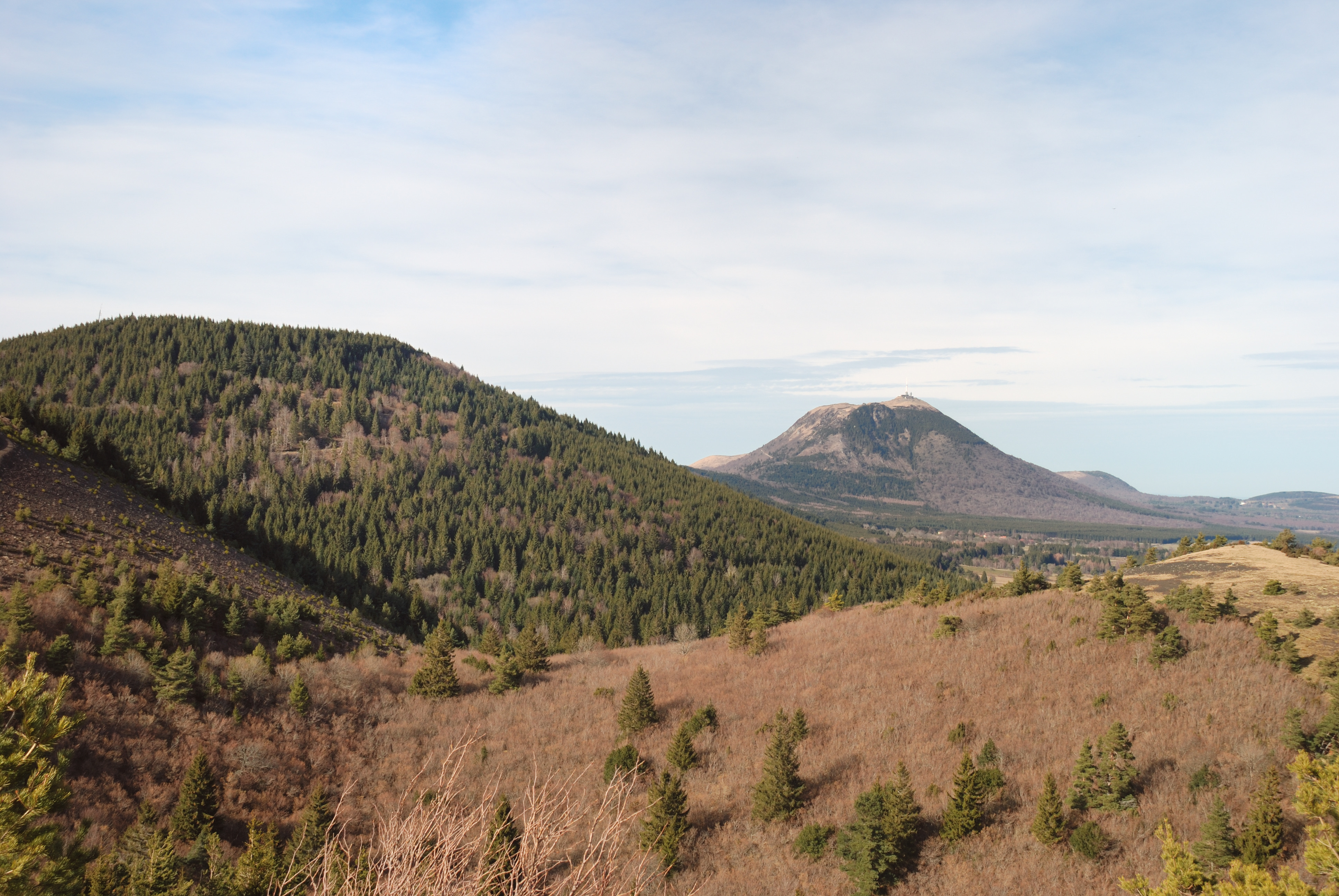
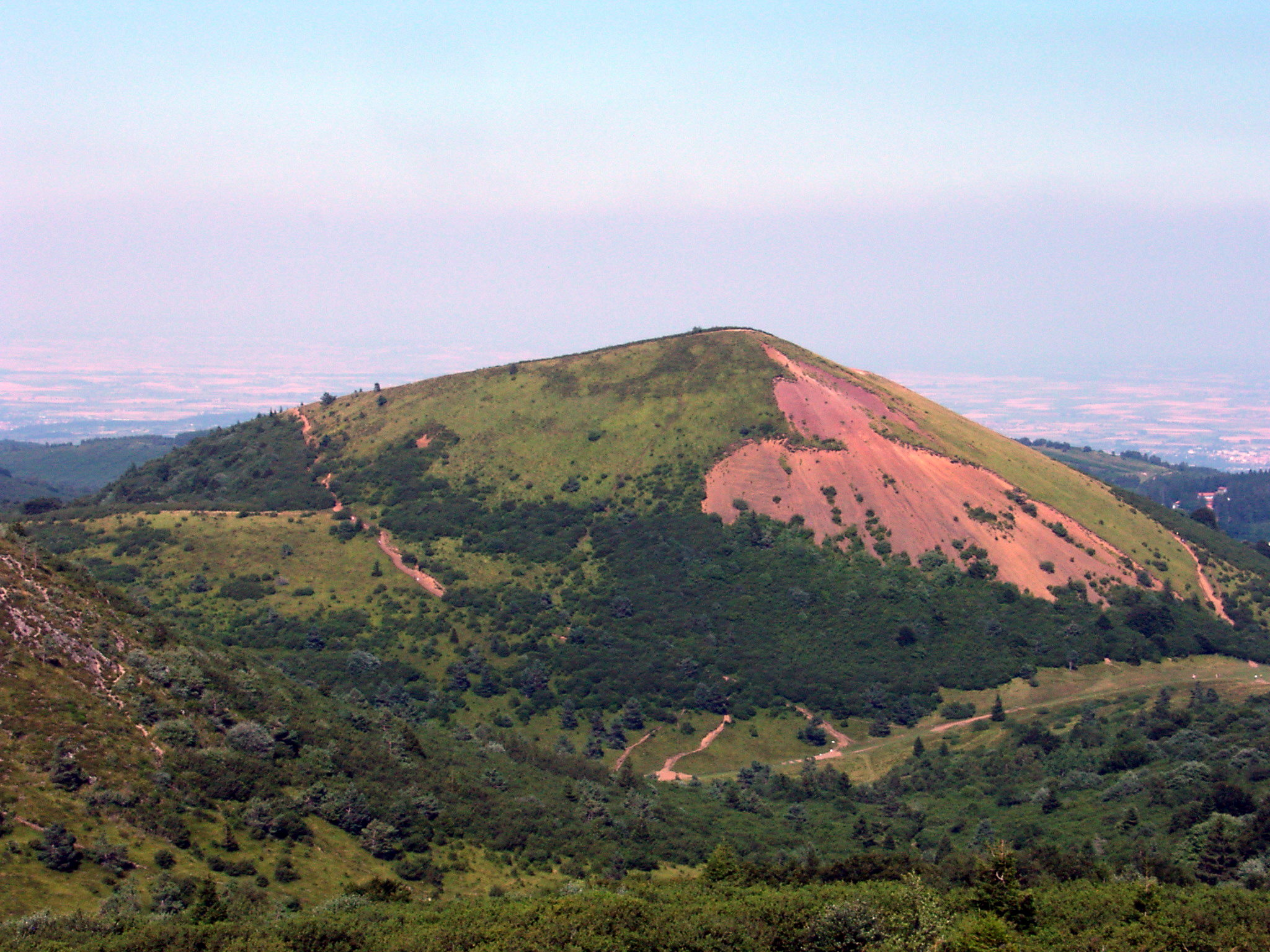
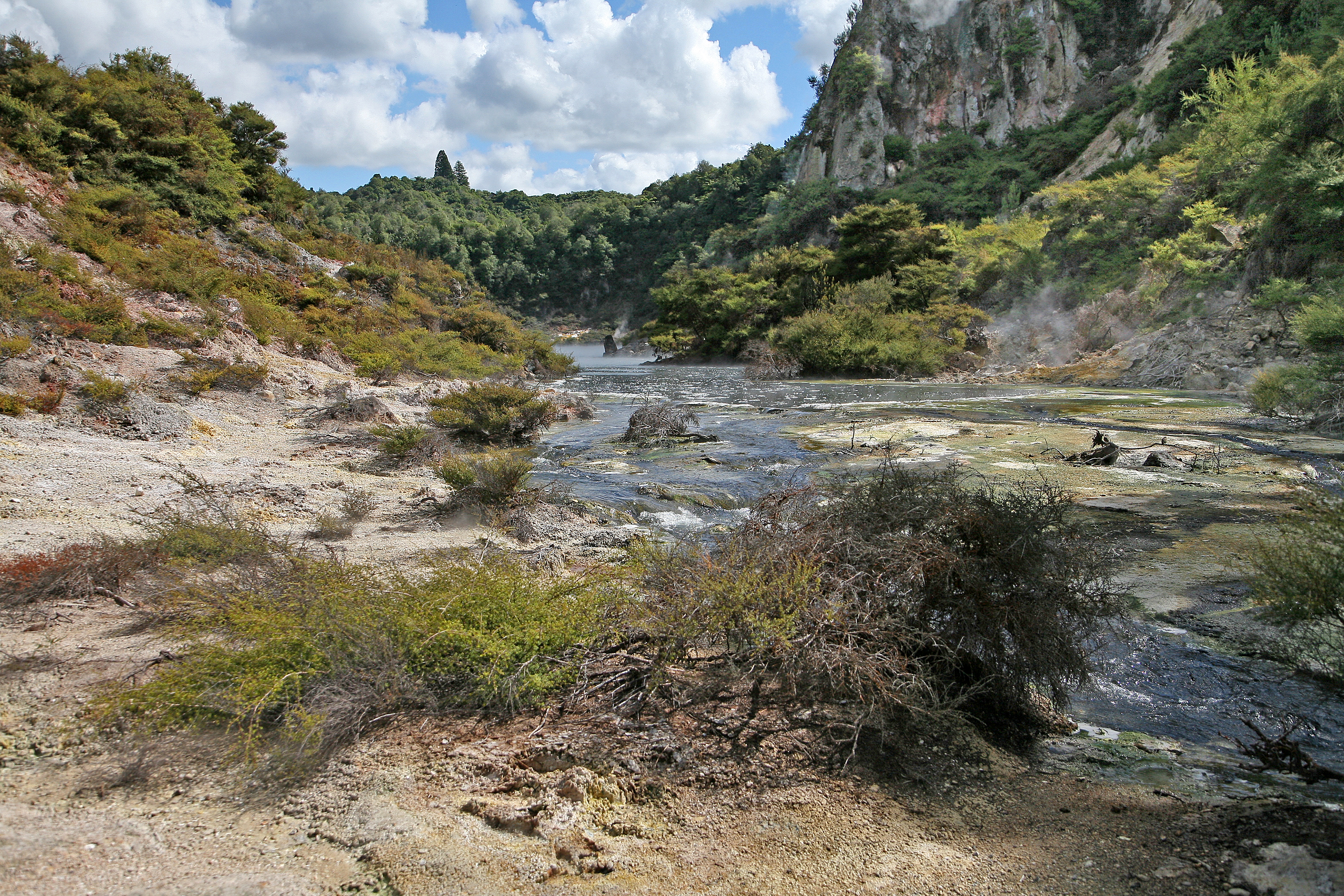
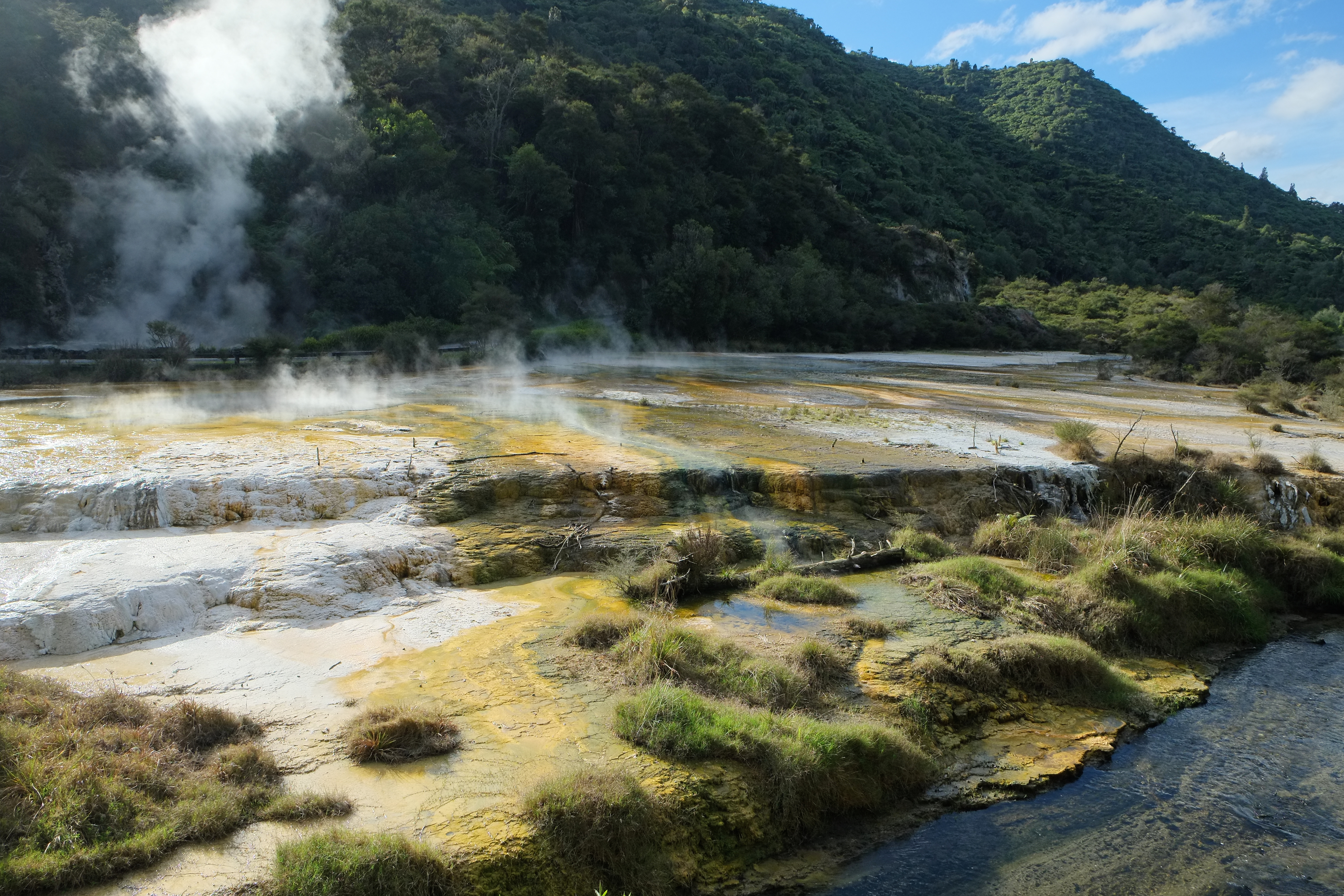
The Chaîne des Puys (Massif Central region) volcanoes were formed in a similar "sudden" way of the layers recovered at Djupadalsmölla and Karup. Over this landscape environments similar to modern Waimangu Volcanic Rift Valley where developed.

The Djupadalsmölla deposits, with moderately sorted lapilli tuff and abundant wood, indicate a terrestrial environment influenced by freshwater. Likely deposited in a fluvial setting with debris flows from nearby volcanoes like Äskekull, the site includes sandstone layers with ripple marks, suggesting coeval deposition with pyroclastics. Barium-enriched zeolites suggest hydrothermal seawater circulation, causing diagenetic changes.

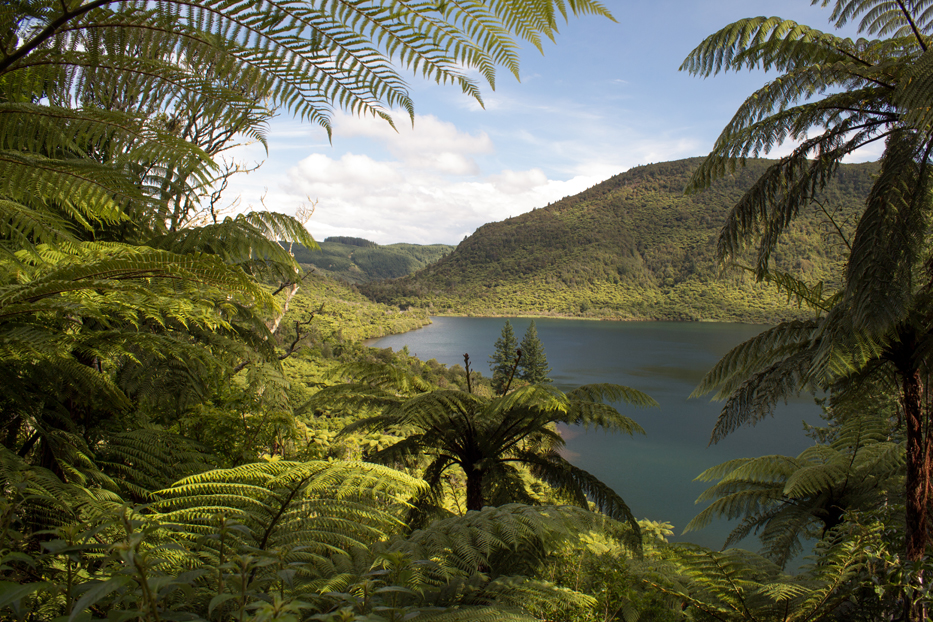
The Sandåkra Lake which appeared before the emergence of the local volcanics, was likely born of an event where the hinterland flood a geological rift breach, in a similar way to modern Lake Rotokakahi of New Zealand

The KBH2 borehole indicates a weathered basement, likely altered in the 25 Ma between the Rhaetian and Late Pliensbachian, followed by a dark shale layer suggesting a marine-influenced lagoon or bay. Palynology reveals a humid, moderately warm climate with conifer-dominated forests, ginkgoes, seed ferns, and fern understories, occasionally disrupted by forest fires. Volcanic clasts and charred wood confirm deposition through forested areas into a shallow, low-energy water body, followed by marine transgression.

At Korsaröd, freshwater algae and fossilized wood suggest a river-influenced, Mediterranean-type biome with low rainfall and active Strombolian volcanism, comparable to modern Rotorua, New Zealand. The vegetation, dominated by Cupressaceae and Erdtmanithecales, faced volcanic disruptions and hydrothermal activity, with rapid wood permineralization. Well-preserved Osmundastrum ferns indicate a moist gully engulfed by lahar deposits.

=== Sandåkra Lake System ===
North of the volcanic outcrops, the Sandåkra Sapropel, up to 150 meters thick, includes sandstones, clays, oil shales, and breccias, partly coeval with the Djupadal volcanism. Deposited in a 70-meter-deep limnic/lacustrine deposit, likely formed in a tectonic breach or topographic depression, it lacks marine palynomorphs and contains volcanic minerals in its upper sections. The lake, fed by ephemeral streams, developed anoxic conditions, similar to modern Lake Rotokakahi in New Zealand or the Toarcian Sichuan Lake (Ziliujing Formation), with upper sections influenced by volcanic material akin to the Waimangu Volcanic Valley.

== Fossils ==
=== Pseudofungi ===
Color key: Taxon / Reclassified taxon / Taxon falsely reported as present / Dubious taxon or junior synonym / Ichnotaxon / Ootaxon / Morphotaxon	Notes; Uncertain or tentative taxa are in small text; ~~crossed out~~ taxa are discredited.

Genus	Species	Location	Material	Notes	Images
Peronosporomycetes	Indeterminate	Korsaröd	Oogonia; Ellipsoidal spores; Reticulum?	Was recovered from the petiole of the holotype of Osmundastrum pulchellum and interpreted as a peronosporomycete with parasitic or saprotrophic relation with this part of the plant. If the identification of the oogonia of peronosporomycetes is correct, then this implies regularly moist conditions for the growth of Osmundastrum pulchellum and this is consistent with the general habitat preferences of extant Osmundastrum.	Extant Phytophthora, a Pseudofungal protist like the ones found Osmundastrum pulchellum

=== Fungi ===
Genus	Species	Location	Material	Notes	Images
Fungi	Indeterminate	Korsaröd	Spores; Hyphae	From the petiole and the root of Osmundastrum pulchellum where recovered thread-like structures, identified as derived from a pathogenic or saprotrophic fungus invading necrotic tissues of the host plant. The fungus' interaction with the plant was probably mycorrhizal.	Extant Microglossum, a saprotrophic fungus whose Hypae are similar to the ones found O. pulchellum

=== Acritarchs ===
Genus	Species	Location	Material	Notes	Images
Leiofusa	L. jurassica	Bonnarp Volcano	Acritarch	Incertae sedis	
Leiosphaera	L. sp. A (Gross); L. sp. B (Thin)	Bonnarp Volcano	Acritarch	Incertae sedis	
Micrhystridium	M. inconspicuum; M. stellatum; M. cf. fragile	Bonnarp Volcano	Acritarch	Incertae sedis	
Tetraporina	T. tetragona	KBH2 Borehole at Djupadalsmölla	Acritarch	Incertae sedis	
Veryhachium	V. spp.	KBH2 Borehole at Djupadalsmölla	Acritarch	Incertae sedis	

=== Dinoflagellates ===
Genus	Species	Location	Material	Notes	Images
Cymatiosphaera	C. sp.	Bonnarp Volcano	Cysts	A marine/brackish dinoflagellate, member of the family Pterospermopsidaceae inside Gonyaulacales.	
Dapcodinium	D. priscum	KBH2 Borehole at Djupadalsmölla	Cysts	A marine/brackish Dinoflagellate, considered a primitive member of the order Peridiniales. A possible Fennoscandian endemism	
Mancodinium	M. semitabulatum	KBH2 Borehole at Djupadalsmölla	Cysts	A marine/brackish dinoflagellate, member of the family Mancodinioideae.	
Maturodinium	M. inornatum	KBH2 Borehole at Djupadalsmölla	Cysts	A marine/brackish dinoflagellate, considered a primitive member of the order Peridiniales.	
Mendicodinium	M. groenlandicum; M. reticulatum; M. varigranosum; M. vermiculatum; M. sp. cf. morgenrothum; M. spp.	KBH2 Borehole at Djupadalsmölla	Cysts	A marine/brackish dinoflagellate, member of the order Gonyaulacales.	
Nannoceratopsis	N. gracilis; N. cf. pellucida; N. spp.	KBH2 Borehole at Djupadalsmölla; Bonnarp Volcano	Cysts	A marine/brackish dinoflagellate, type member of the family Nannoceratopsiaceae.	

=== Chlorophyta ===
Genus	Species	Location	Material	Notes	Images
Botryococcus	B. braunii; B. spp.	KBH2 Borehole at Djupadalsmölla; Sandåkra Borehole; Korsaröd	Miospores	A freshwater algae, type member of Botryococcaceae inside Chlorophyta	Extant Botryococcus
Cymatiosphaera	C. spp.	KBH2 Borehole at Djupadalsmölla	Miospores	A brackish/marine algae, member of Pterospermopsidaceae.	
Lecaniella	L. korsdoddensis; L. spp.	KBH2 Borehole at Djupadalsmölla; Korsaröd	Miospores	A freshwater algae, member of Zygnemataceae inside Charophyceae. On some samples is the only recovered algae.	
Leiosphaerida	L. spp.	KBH2 Borehole at Djupadalsmölla	Miospores	A brackish/marine algae, member of Prasinophyceae.	
Ovoidites	O. spp.	KBH2 Borehole at Djupadalsmölla	Miospores	A brackish/marine algae, member of Zygnemataceae.	
Pediastrum	P. sp.	Korsaröd	Miospores	A freshwater algae, member of Hydrodictyaceae inside Chlorophyceae.	Extant Pediastrum
Tasmanites	T. spp.	KBH2 Borehole at Djupadalsmölla	Miospores	A brackish/marine algae, member of Pyramimonadaceae.	

=== Bryophyta ===
Genus	Species	Location	Material	Notes	Images
Annulispora	A. folliculosa	KBH2 Borehole at Djupadalsmölla	Miospores	A miospore, incertae sedis inside Sphagnopsida.	
Polycingulatisporites	P. sp.	Korsaröd	Miospores	A miospore, related with the family Notothyladaceae inside Anthocerotopsida.	
Rogalskaisporites	R. cicatricosus	KBH2 Borehole at Djupadalsmölla	Miospores	A miospore, incertae sedis inside Sphagnopsida.	
Stereisporites	S. antiquasporis; S. aulosenensis; S. seebergensis; S. psilatus; S. spp.	KBH2 Borehole at Djupadalsmölla; Korsaröd	Miospores	A miospore, member of Sphagnaceae inside Sphagnopsida. The most abundant bryophyte spore	Extant Sphagnum, typical example of Sphagnaceae. Stereisporites probably come from a similar or a related plant

=== Lycophyta ===
Genus	Species	Location	Material	Notes	Images
Aequitriradites	A. salebrosaceus; A. sp. nov.	Sandåkra Borehole	Miospores	A miospore, affinities with Selaginellaceae or Lycopodiaceae inside Lycopodiopsida.	
Aratrisporites	A. minimus; A. spp.	KBH2 Borehole at Djupadalsmölla	Miospores	A miospore, incertae sedis inside Lycopodiopsida.	
Densoisporites	D. crassus	Korsaröd	Miospores	A miospore, affinities with Pleuromeiaceae, Selaginellaceae and Lycopodiaceae inside Lycopodiopsida.	
Kraeuselisporites	K. reissingeri	KBH2 Borehole at Djupadalsmölla	Miospores	A miospore, incertae sedis inside Lycopodiopsida.	
Lycospora	L. salebrosacea	KBH2 Borehole at Djupadalsmölla	Miospores	A miospore, incertae sedis inside Lycopodiopsida.	
Neoraistrickia	N. sp.	Korsaröd	Miospores	A miospore, affinities with Selaginellaceae or Lycopodiaceae inside Lycopodiopsida. The most abundant Lycopsid spore recovered locally.	Extant Selaginella, typical example of Selaginellaceae. Neoraistrickia probably come from a similar or a related plant
Retitriletes	R. austroclavatidites; R. clavatoides; R. semimuris	KBH2 Borehole at Djupadalsmölla; Korsaröd	Miospores	A miospore, affinities with Lycopodiaceae inside Lycopodiopsida. Diverse, but less abundant	Extant Austrolycopodium, typical example of Lycopodiaceae. Retitriletes probably come from a similar or a related plant
Selaginellites?	S.? sp.	Korsaröd	Epiphytic lycopsid roots	External exotic roots are preserved within detritus-filled cavities between the petiole bases of Osmundastrum pulchellum, with wall thickenings similar to the vasculature evident in ancient and modern herbaceous lycopsids.	

=== Equisetopsida ===
Genus	Species	Location	Material	Notes	Images
Calamospora	C. tener	KBH2 Borehole at Djupadalsmölla; Korsaröd	Miospores	A miospore, affinities with Equisetaceae inside Equisetales. Horsetails, herbaceous flora related to high humid environments, flooding tolerant plants.	Extant Equisetum cone, the typical example of the Equisetopsida. Calamospora spores are pretty similar to the extant ones

=== Filicopsida ===
Genus	Species	Location	Material	Notes	Images
Acanthotriletes	A. ovalis; A. trigonis; A. varius	Sandåkra Borehole	Miospores	Affinities with the Botryopteridaceae inside Filicopsida. Reworked from primitive ferns found in Devonian and Carboniferous rocks of Europe	
Apiculatasporites	A. varians	Sandåkra Borehole	Miospores	A miospore, affinities with Zygopteridaceae inside Filicopsida.	
Auritulinasporites	A. intrastriatus; A. scanicus; A. triclavis	Sandåkra Borehole	Miospores	A miospore, affinities with Matoniaceae inside Filicopsida.	Extant Matonia, typical example of the Matoniaceae. Auritulinasporites may have come from a similar genus
Baculatisporites	B. comaumensis	KBH2 Borehole at Djupadalsmölla; Korsaröd	Miospores	A miospore, affinities with Osmundaceae or Hymenophyllaceae inside Filicopsida.	Extant Hymenophyllum, typical example of the Hymenophyllaceae. Baculatisporites may have come from a similar genus
Bracteolinasporites	B. clavatus	Sandåkra Borehole	Miospores	A miospore, affinities with Osmundaceae inside Filicopsida.	
Cibotiumspora	C. jurienensis	KBH2 Borehole at Djupadalsmölla; Korsaröd	Miospores	A miospore, related with Cyatheaceae and Dicksoniaceae inside Filicopsida. Recovered on the petiole and the root of Osmundastrum puchellum.	
Conbaculatisporites	C. mesozoicus	KBH2 Borehole at Djupadalsmölla; Korsaröd	Miospores	A miospore, ‘’incertae sedis’’ inside Filicopsida.	
Concavisporites	C.crassexinius; C. Sp	Bonnarp Volcano; Sandåkra Borehole	Miospores	A miospore, related with Cibotiaceae, Gleicheniaceae, Matoniaceae and Dipteridaceae inside Filicopsida.	
Contignisporites	C. problematicus	Korsaröd	Miospores	A miospore, related with Cibotiaceae inside Filicopsida.	Extant Cibotium, typical example of the Cibotiaceae. Contignisporites may have come from a similar genus
Corrugatisporites	C. klukiformis; C. scanicus	Sandåkra Borehole	Miospores	A miospore, related to Schizaeaceae inside Filicopsida. Miospores of the fern Klukia exilis	
Cosmosporites	C. elegans	Sandåkra Borehole	Miospores	A miospore, ‘’incertae sedis’’ inside Filicopsida.	
Converrucosisporites	C. Sp	KBH2 Borehole at Djupadalsmölla	Miospores	A miospore, affinities with Osmundaceae inside Filicopsida.	
Cyathidites	C. australis; C. minor	KBH2 Borehole at Djupadalsmölla; Korsaröd; Bonnarp Volcano	Miospores	A miospore, related with Cyatheaceae or Adiantaceae inside Filicopsida. Recovered on the petiole and the root of Osmundastrum puchellum. Cyathidites minor almost certainly belong to well known Mesozoic species Coniopteris hymenophylloides and to other fossil cyatheaceous or dicksoniaceous ferns such as Eboracia lobifolia and Dicksonia mariopteri.	Extant Cyathea, typical example of the Cyatheaceae. Cyathidites may have come from a similar genus
Cyclinasporites	C. minutus	Sandåkra Borehole	Miospores	A miospore, ‘’incertae sedis’’ inside Filicopsida.	
Deltoidospora	D. toralis; D. australis; D.minor	KBH2 Borehole at Djupadalsmölla; Korsaröd	Miospores	A miospore, related with Cyatheaceae, Dicksoniaceae, Gleicheniaceae and Schizaeaceae inside Filicopsida. Recovered on the petiole and the root of Osmundastrum puchellum.	
Gleicheniidites	G. conspiciendus; G. senonicus; G. Sp	KBH2 Borehole at Djupadalsmölla; Bonnarp Volcano	Miospores	A miospore, related with Gleicheniaceae inside Filicopsida.	
Laevigatosporites	L. spp.	KBH2 Borehole at Djupadalsmölla	Miospores	A miospore, affinities with Marattiales inside Filicopsida.	
Lycopodiacidites	L. rugulatus	KBH2 Borehole at Djupadalsmölla; Korsaröd	Miospores	A miospore, affinities with Ophioglossaceae inside Filicopsida.	Extant Ophioglossum, typical example of the Ophioglossaceae. Lycopodiacidites may have come from a similar genus
Marattisporites	M. scabratus	KBH2 Borehole at Djupadalsmölla; Korsaröd; Sandåkra Borehole	Miospores	A miospore, affinities with Marattiaceae inside Filicopsida. The second most abundant spore recovered on the location	Extant Marattia, typical example of the Marattiaceae. Marattisporites may have come from a similar genus
Matonisporites	M. phlebopteroides; M. Sp	KBH2 Borehole at Djupadalsmölla	Miospores	A miospore, affinities with Matoniaceae inside Filicopsida.	
Osmundacidites	O. wellmanii	KBH2 Borehole at Djupadalsmölla; Korsaröd; Bonnarp Volcano	Miospores	A miospore, affinities with Osmundaceae inside Filicopsida.	Extant Osmunda, typical example of the Osmundaceae. Osmundacidites may have come from a similar genus
Osmundastrum	O. pulchellum	Korsaröd	Permineralized Rizhome	A small (50 cm tall) Royal Fern, member of Osmundaceae inside Filicopsida. The most known fossil of the location, thanks to its exceptional fossilized Rhizome, that has preserved Nuclei and Chromosomes, a fine subcellular detail has rarely been documented in fossils. Its Rooted in DNA content was used to extrapolate relative genome, finding relationships with extant Osmundastrum cinnamomeum, and confirmed a monophyletic Osmunda.	Osmundastrum pulchellum rhizome
Punctatasporites	P. flavus; P. globosus	KBH2 Borehole at Djupadalsmölla; Sandåkra Borehole	Miospores	A miospore, ‘’incertae sedis’’ inside Filicopsida.	
Skarbysporites	S. crassexina	KBH2 Borehole at Djupadalsmölla	Miospores	A miospore, ‘’incertae sedis’’ inside Filicopsida.	
Simplicesporites	S. granulosus	Sandåkra Borehole	Miospores	A miospore, ‘’incertae sedis’’ inside Filicopsida.	
Striatella	S. seebergensis	KBH2 Borehole at Djupadalsmölla; Korsaröd	Miospores	A miospore, affinities with Polypodiaceae inside Filicopsida.	
Tigrisporites	T. scurrandus	KBH2 Borehole at Djupadalsmölla	Miospores	A miospore, ‘’incertae sedis’’ inside Filicopsida.	
Trachysporites	T. asper; T. fuscus; T. microclavatus; T. punctulosus; T. sparsus; T. tuberosus; T. Sp	KBH2 Borehole at Djupadalsmölla; Sandåkra Borehole	Miospores	A miospore, ‘’incertae sedis’’ inside Filicopsida.	
Todisporites	T. major; T. minor	Korsaröd	Miospores	A miospore, affinities with Osmundaceae inside Filicopsida.	Extant Osmunda, typical example of the Osmundaceae. Todisporites may have come from a similar genus
Undulatisporites	U. arquatus	Sandåkra Borehole	Miospores	A miospore, ‘’incertae sedis’’ inside Filicopsida.	
Zebrasporites	Z. interscriptus	KBH2 Borehole at Djupadalsmölla; Korsaröd	Miospores	A miospore, related with Cyatheaceae inside Filicopsida. Arboreal Fern Miospores.	Extant Cyathea, typical example of the Cyatheaceae. Zebrasporites may have come from a similar genus

=== Peltaspermales ===
Genus	Species	Location	Material	Notes	Images
Alisporites	A. grandis; A. thomasii; A. robustus; A. microsaccus	KBH2 Borehole at Djupadalsmölla; Sandåkra Borehole; Korsaröd	Pollen	A pollen grain, affinities with Umkomasiaceae, Peltaspermaceae, Corystospermaceae and Caytoniaceae inside Pteridospermae.	
Chordasporites	C. spp.	KBH2 Borehole at Djupadalsmölla	Pollen	A pollen grain, affinities with Corystospermaceae inside Pteridospermae.	
Caytonipollenites	C. sp.	Sandåkra Borehole	Pollen	A pollen grain, affinities with Caytoniaceae inside Pteridospermae.	
Crassipollenites	C. classopolloides; C. diffusus; C. rugosus	Sandåkra Borehole	Pollen	A pollen grain, affinities with Caytoniaceae inside Pteridospermae.	
Ovalipollis	O. sp.	Bonnarp Volcano	Pollen	A pollen grain, affinities with Caytoniaceae inside Pteridospermae.	
Pityopollenites	P. pallidus	Sandåkra Borehole	Pollen	A pollen grain, affinities with Umkomasiaceae, Peltaspermaceae, Corystospermaceae and Caytoniaceae inside Pteridospermae.	
Protopinus	P. scanicus	Sandåkra Borehole	Pollen	A pollen grain, affinities with Caytoniaceae inside Pteridospermae.	
Schismatosporites	S. ovalis	Sandåkra Borehole	Pollen	A pollen grain, affinities with Umkomasiaceae, Peltaspermaceae, Corystospermaceae and Caytoniaceae inside Pteridospermae.	
Vitreisporites	V. bjuvensis; V. pallidus	KBH2 Borehole at Djupadalsmölla; Korsaröd; Sandåkra Borehole	Pollen	A pollen grain, afinnities with Caytoniales inside Gymnospermopsida.	

=== Erdtmanithecales ===
Genus	Species	Location	Material	Notes	Images
Eucommiidites	E. troedssonii; E. minor; E. spp.	KBH2 Borehole at Djupadalsmölla; Korsaröd; Sandåkra Borehole; Bonnarp Volcano	Pollen	A pollen grain, affinities with Erdtmanithecales inside Spermatophytes. The Gymnosperms that produced Eucommiidites troedsonii pollen possibly dominated the understorey vegetation.	

=== Gnetales ===
Genus	Species	Location	Material	Notes	Images
Equisetosporites	E. hallei	Sandåkra Borehole	Pollen	A pollen grain, affinities with Ephedraceae inside Gnetopsida. This Pollen grain was thought to be from Equisetaleans, yet was found in Ephedra chinleana	Extant Ephedra, typical example of Ephedraceae. Equisetosporites probably come from a similar or a related Plant

=== Cycadophyta ===
Genus	Species	Location	Material	Notes	Images
Bennettitaceaeacuminella	B. sp.	Bonnarp Volcano	Pollen	A Pollen Grain, affinities with Cycadeoidaceae and Williamsoniaceae inside Bennettitales. A genus used to classify Bennetittalean grains of uncertain provenance	
Chasmatosporites	C. apertus; C. elegans; C. hians; C. crassus; C. flavus; C. latus; C. magnolioides; C. major; C. minor; C. radiatus; C. rimatus; C. scaber	KBH2 Borehole at Djupadalsmölla; Korsaröd; Sandåkra Borehole	Pollen	A pollen grain, incertae sedis inside Cycadopsida, Corystospermaceae and Araucariaceae. Is among the most abundant flora recovered on the upper section of the coeval Rya Formation, and was found to be similar to the pollen of the extant Encephalartos laevifolius.	Extant Encephalartos laevifolius. Chasmatosporites maybe come from a related plant
Clavatipollenites	C. hughesii	KBH2 Borehole at Djupadalsmölla	Pollen	A pollen grain, incertae sedis inside Cycadopsida, Bennettitales, and Axelrodiales	
Cycadidae	Indeterminate	Djupadalsmölla	Coalified Cuticles	A Cycad, afinnities with Cycadidae inside Cycadopsida.	
Entylissa	E. pyriformis; E. reticulata; E. tecta; E. tenuis	Sandåkra Borehole	Pollen	A pollen grain, incertae sedis inside Cycadopsida. It also can be pollen from Ginkgoaceae.	Extant Encephalartos, typical example of the Cycas. Monosulcites pollen is pretty similar to the extant ones of this genus
Monocolpopollenites	M. acerrimus; M. cotidianus; M. fusiformis; M. magnus; M. ovalis	Sandåkra Borehole	Pollen	A pollen grain, incertae sedis inside Cycadopsida. It also can be pollen from Ginkgoaceae.	
Monosulcites	M. punctatus; M. magnolioides; M. echinatus; M. spp.	KBH2 Borehole at Djupadalsmölla; Korsaröd; Sandåkra Borehole	Pollen	A pollen grain, incertae sedis inside Cycadopsida. It also can be pollen from Ginkgoaceae.	
Ptilophyllum	P. sp.	Korsaröd	Leaf Impression	A Bennetite, afinnities with Williamsoniaceae inside Bennettitales. This single impression of a bennettitalean leaf fragment found in a fine ash layer constituted the only foliar remains identified within the volcaniclastic deposit of Korsaröd	Example of Ptilophyllum leaf

=== Ginkgophyta ===
Genus	Species	Location	Material	Notes	Images
Ginkgoites	G. nitidus	Korsaröd	Pollen	A pollen grain, affinities with Ginkgoales inside Ginkgophyta. Ginkgoales trend to spike towards the Toarcian in the Northern European region, as seen in the coeval Sorthat Formation of Bornholm	Extant Ginkgo, only surviving example of the Ginkgoaceae. Ginkgoites Pollen is pretty similar to the extant ones of this genus

=== Coniferophyta ===
Genus	Species	Location	Material	Notes	Images
Araucariacites	A. australis	KBH2 Borehole at Djupadalsmölla; Korsaröd	Pollen	A pollen grain, affinites with the family Araucariaceae inside Pinales.	
Callialasporites	C. turbatus; C. sp.	KBH2 Borehole at Djupadalsmölla	Pollen	A pollen grain, affinites with the family Araucariaceae inside Pinales.	
Cedripites	C. sp.	Korsaröd	Pollen	A pollen grain, affinities with Pinaceae inside Coniferophyta.	Extant Cedrus Cone, example of the Pinidae. Cedripites is similar to the pollen found on this genus
Cerebropollenites	C. mesozoicus; C. macroverrucosus; C. thiergartii	KBH2 Borehole at Djupadalsmölla; Korsaröd; Sandåkra Borehole; Bonnarp Volcano	Pollen	A pollen grain, affinities with both Sciadopityaceae and Miroviaceae inside Pinopsida. This Pollen resemblance with extant Sciadopitys suggest that Miroviaceae can be an extinct lineage of sciadopityaceaous-like plants	Extant Sciadopitys. Cerebropollenites likely come from a related plant
Classopollis	C. classoides; C. meyerianus	KBH2 Borehole at Djupadalsmölla; Korsaröd; Sandåkra Borehole; Bonnarp Volcano	Pollen	A pollen grain, affinities with Cheirolepidiaceae inside Coniferophyta.	
Exesipollenites	E. tumulus	KBH2 Borehole at Djupadalsmölla	Pollen	A pollen grain, affinities with Cupressaceae inside Coniferophyta. Lowland (coastal) indicator	
Granulonapites	G. baculatus; G. punctatus	Sandåkra Borehole	Pollen	A pollen grain, affinites with the family Araucariaceae inside Pinales.	
Inaperturopollenites	I. flavus; I. globulus; I. irregularis; I. orbiculatus; I. sublevis; I. triangularis	Sandåkra Borehole	Pollen	A pollen grain, affinities with Taxodiaceae and Cupressaceae inside Coniferophyta. Its abundance at Sandåkra Borehole can indicate the presence of a Taxodium Swamp-like habitat	
Parvisaccites	P. enigmatus	Korsaröd	Pollen	A Pollen grain, affinities with Podocarpaceae and Cupressaceae inside Coniferophyta.	Extant Podocarpus Cone, example of the Podocarpaceae. Parvisaccites is similar to the pollen found on this genus
Perinopollenites	P. elatoides	KBH2 Borehole at Djupadalsmölla; Korsaröd	Pollen	A pollen grain, affinities with Taxodiaceae and Cupressaceae inside Coniferophyta. Affiliated with extant genera such as Thuja plicata	Extant Thuja Cone, example of the Cupressaceae. Perinopollenites is similar to the pollen found on this genus
Piceoideae	Indeterminate	Djupadalsmölla	Coalified cuticles	A conifer, affinities with Piceoideae inside Pinaceae. One of the branched leaves found wears ano organic structure that resembles extant Spruces. Likely belong to the common Picea-like foliage of Pityocladus	
Pinoideae	Indeterminate A; Indeterminate B	Djupadalsmölla	Coalified cuticles	A conifer, afinnities with Pinoideae inside Pinaceae. In the initial revision of Djupadalsmölla Nathorst determined that some of the plant remains come from conifers. Latter revision showed that three clearly distinct species are represented and two resemble the genus Pinus. Likely belong to Schizolepidopsis, as is the most common Pinaceae in the Eurasian region in the Jurassic	
Pinuspollenites	P. minimus; P. pinoides	KBH2 Borehole at Djupadalsmölla; Korsaröd	Pollen	A pollen grain, affinities with Pinaceae inside Coniferophyta.	Example of extant Pinus, Pinuspollenites pollen is considered related with it
Protocedroxylon	P. lindleyanum; P. spp.	Korsaröd; Karup; Färingtofta; Snalleröd	Fossil wood	A conifer, affinities with Pinaceae (Probably Abietoideae) inside Coniferophyta. Referred originally to the genus Cedroxylon, using it as reference to establish an Eocene age for the volcanic deposits, as similar wood from Eocene age was recovered from Jutland. This genus has been found to not be suitable to Mesozoic woods, and material similar to the one recovered on the volcanic deposits has been assigned to Tiloxylon (=Protocedroxylon), also known in the Toarcian of Greenland.	
Protopiceoxylon	P. spp.	Djupadalsmölla	Fossil Wood	A conifer, affinities with Piceoideae inside Coniferophyta. Various Pinus-like woods are identified in Djupadalsmölla, they indicate that the lava flows flowed from a nearby forest setting.	
Protophyllocladoxylon	P. spp.	Korsaröd; Djupadal; Karup; Färingtofta; Snalleröd; Sjöberga; Säte; Knutshög; Bonnarp	Fossil wood	A conifer, affinities with Cupressaceae inside Coniferophyta. The main diagnostic wood recovered locally, identified based on the possession of uniseriate rays with smooth walls, pointed oblique oopores, absence of axial parenchyma, and tracheid radial walls. It resembles the extant Thuja plicata, but hosts a mean rings more similar to Juniperus thurifera. A few fossil wood specimens clearly represent portions of large trunks, with at least one fragment derived from a trunk of 1.68 m in diameter (with estimated c.5.3 m). Although, most specimens represent lateral branches or even roots of small size (10 cm long and 5 cm wide). Its growth rings are distinct in all wood samples.	Permineralized Protophyllocladoxylon wood with a branch trace recovered from the volcaniclastic sediments at Korsaröd
Podocarpidites	P. spp.	KBH2 Borehole at Djupadalsmölla	Pollen	A pollen grain, affinities with Podocarpaceae inside Coniferophyta.	
Phyllocladiidites	P. spp.	KBH2 Borehole at Djupadalsmölla	Pollen	A pollen grain, incertae sedis affinities inside Coniferophyta.	
Quadraeculina	Q. anaellaeformis	KBH2 Borehole at Djupadalsmölla; Korsaröd	Pollen	A pollen grain, affinities with Podocarpaceae and Pinaceae inside Coniferophyta.	
Rugaletes	R. sp.	Korsaröd	Pollen	A pollen grain, incertae sedis inside Coniferophyta.	
Spheripollenites	S. psilatus; S. subgranulatus; S. spp.	KBH2 Borehole at Djupadalsmölla; Korsaröd	Pollen	A pollen grain, affinities with Cheirolepidiaceae inside Coniferophyta.	
Sulcatisporites	S. pinoides; S. quadratus	Sandåkra Borehole	Pollen	A pollen grain, affinities with Pinaceae inside Coniferophyta.	
Taedaepollenites	T. scaurus; T. kraeuseli	Sandåkra Borehole	Pollen	A pollen grain, affinities with Pinaceae inside Coniferophyta.	

=== Arachnida ===
Genus	Species	Location	Material	Notes	Images
Oribatida	Indeterminate	Korsaröd	Excavated areas filled with coprolites	On the petiole of Osmundastrum puchellum excavations up to 715 μm in diameter are evident, filled with pellets that resemble the coprolites of Oribatid mites found also on Paleozoic and Mesozoic Woods.	example of Oribatida mite

== See also ==
- List of fossiliferous stratigraphic units in Sweden
- Kristianstad Basin
- Toarcian formations
- Mizur Formation, North Caucasus
- Sachrang Formation, Austria
- Saubach Formation, Austria
- Posidonia Shale, Lagerstätte in Germany
- Ciechocinek Formation, Germany and Poland
- Calcare di Sogno, Italy
- Marne di Monte Serrone, Italy
- Lava Formation, Lithuania
- Krempachy Marl Formation, Poland and Slovakia
- Rya Formation, Sweden

== Bibliography ==
- Wahlqvist, Per (2023). Stratigraphy and palaeoenvironment of the early Jurassic volcaniclastic strata at Djupadalsmölla, central Skåne, Sweden (PDF) (Master's thesis). Vol. 646. Lund University.
- Vajda, V.; Linderson, H.; McLoughlin, S. (2016). "Disrupted vegetation as a response to Jurassic volcanism in southern Sweden". Geological Society, London, Special Publications. 434 (1): 127–147. Bibcode:2016GSLSP.434..127V. doi:10.1144/SP434.17. S2CID 53626549. Text was copied from this source, which is available under a Creative Commons Attribution 3.0 (CC BY 3.0) license.
- Stumpf, Sebastian; Ansorge, Jörg; Grimmberger, Gunther (2016). "Grätensandsteine und andere Geschiebe des oberen Lias (Toarcium) aus Norddeutschland" [Upper Liassic sandstones with fish remains (so-called Grätensandsteine) and other Toarcian glacial erratics from northern Germany]. Geschiebekunde Aktuell. 32 (4): 121–141.
- McLoughlin, S.; Bomfleur, B. (2016). "Biotic interactions in an exceptionally well preserved osmundaceous fern rhizome from the Early Jurassic of Sweden". Palaeogeography, Palaeoclimatology, Palaeoecology. 464 (1): 86–96. Bibcode:2016PPP...464...86M. doi:10.1016/j.palaeo.2016.01.044.
- Tappe, S.; Smart, K. A.; Stracke, A.; Romer, R. L.; Prelević, D.; Van den Bogaard, P., P. (2016). "Melt evolution beneath a rifted craton edge: ^{40}Ar/^{39}Ar geochronology and Sr–Nd–Hf–Pb isotope systematics of primitive alkaline basalts and lamprophyres from the SW Baltic Shield". Geochimica et Cosmochimica Acta. 173 (1): 1–36. Bibcode:2016GeCoA.173....1T. doi:10.1016/j.gca.2015.10.006.
- Bomfleur., B.; Grimm, G. W.; McLoughlin, S. (2015). "Osmunda pulchella sp. nov. from the Jurassic of Sweden—reconciling molecular and fossil evidence in the phylogeny of modern royal ferns (Osmundaceae)". BMC Evolutionary Biology. 15 (1): 126. Bibcode:2015BMCEE..15..126B. doi:10.1186/s12862-015-0400-7. PMC 4487210. PMID 26123220.
- Vajda, V.; McLoughlin, S.; Bomfleur, B. (2014). "Fossilfyndet i Korsaröd". Geologiskt Forum-Geological Society of Sweden. 82 (1): 24–29.
- Bomfleur, B.; Grimm, G. W.; McLoughlin, S. (2015). "Osmunda pulchella sp. nov. From the Jurassic of Sweden—reconciling molecular and fossil evidence in the phylogeny of modern royal ferns (Osmundaceae)". BMC Evolutionary Biology. 15 (1) 126: 005777. Bibcode:2015BMCEE..15..126B. bioRxiv 10.1101/005777. doi:10.1186/s12862-015-0400-7. PMC 4487210.
- Bomfleur, B.; McLoughlin, S.; Vajda, V. (2014). "Fossilized nuclei and chromosomes reveal 180 million years of genomic stasis in royal ferns". Science. 343 (6177): 1376–1377. Bibcode:2014Sci...343.1376B. doi:10.1126/science.1249884. PMID 24653037. S2CID 38248823.
- Torsvik, T. H.; Cocks, L. R. M. (2013). "Gondwana from top to base in space and time". Gondwana Research. 24 (3): 999–1030. Bibcode:2013GondR..24..999T. doi:10.1016/j.gr.2013.06.012.
- Bergelin, I.; Obst, K.; Söderlund, U.; Larsson, K.; Johansson, L. (2011). "Mesozoic rift magmatism in the North Sea region: ^{40}Ar/^{39}Ar geochronology of Scanian basalts and geochemical constraints". International Journal of Earth Sciences. 100 (4): 787–804. Bibcode:2011IJEaS.100..787B. doi:10.1007/s00531-010-0516-3. S2CID 128811834.
- Bergelin, I. (2009). "Jurassic volcanism in Skåne, southern Sweden, and its relation to coeval regional and global events". GFF. 131 (1): 165–175. Bibcode:2009GFF...131..165B. doi:10.1080/11035890902851278. S2CID 128825994.
- Philippe, Marc; Bamford, Marion K. (2008). "A key to morphogenera used for Mesozoic conifer-like woods". Review of Palaeobotany and Palynology. 148 (2–4): 184–207. Bibcode:2008RPaPa.148..184P. doi:10.1016/j.revpalbo.2007.09.004.
- Rehfeldt, Tatjana; Obst, Karsten; Johansson, Leif (2007). "Petrogenesis of ultramafic and mafic xenoliths from Mesozoic basanites in southern Sweden: constraints from mineral chemistry". International Journal of Earth Sciences. 96 (1): 433–450. Bibcode:2007IJEaS..96..433R. doi:10.1007/s00531-006-0116-4. S2CID 129737488.
- Bergelin, I. (2006). "^{40}Ar/^{39}Ar Geochronology of Basalts in Scania, S Sweden: Evidence for Two Pulses at 191-178 Ma and 110 Ma, and Their Relation to the Break-up of Pangea". Geologiska Institutionen, Lunds Univ. 1 (1): 2–25.
- Obst, K.; Solyom, Z.; Johansson, L. (2004). "Permo-Carboniferous extension-related magmatism at the SW margin of the Fennoscandian Shield". Geological Society, London, Special Publications. 223 (1): 259–288. Bibcode:2004GSLSP.223..259O. doi:10.1144/GSL.SP.2004.223.01.12. S2CID 128716614.
- Tappe, S. (2004). "Mesozoic mafic alkaline magmatism of southern Scandinavia". Contributions to Mineralogy and Petrology. 148 (3): 312–334. Bibcode:2004CoMP..148..312T. doi:10.1007/s00410-004-0606-y. S2CID 140536796.
- Ahlberg., A.; Sivhed, U.; Erlström, M. (2003). "The Jurassic of Skåne, southern Sweden". GEUS Bulletin. 1 (1): 527–541. doi:10.34194/geusb.v1.4682.
- Augustsson, C. (2001). "Lapilli tuff as evidence of Early Jurassic Strombolian-type volcanism in Scania, southern Sweden". GFF. 123 (1): 23–28. Bibcode:2001GFF...123...23A. doi:10.1080/11035890101231023. S2CID 140544085.
- Harries, Peter J.; Little, Crispin T.S. (1999), "The early Toarcian (Early Jurassic) and the Cenomanian–Turonian (Late Cretaceous) mass extinctions: similarities and contrasts", Palaeogeography, Palaeoclimatology, Palaeoecology, 154 (1–2): 39–66, Bibcode:1999PPP...154...39H, doi:10.1016/S0031-0182(99)00086-3 Bibcode:1999PPP...154...39H
- Augustsson, C. (1999). "Lapillituff som bevis för underjurassisk vulkanism av strombolikaraktär i Skane". Examensarbete, Geologiska Institutionen, Lunds Universitet. 109 (1–16): 1–12.
- Lidmar-Bergströml, K.; Olsson, S.; Olvmo, M. (1997). "Palaeosurfaces and associated saprolites in southern Sweden". Geological Society, London, Special Publications. 120 (1): 95–124. Bibcode:1997GSLSP.120...95L. doi:10.1144/GSL.SP.1997.120.01.07. S2CID 129229906.
- Erlström, M.; Thomas, S. A.; Deeks, N.; Sivhed, U. (1997). "Structure and tectonic evolution of the Tornquist Zone and adjacent sedimentary basins in Scania and the southern Baltic Sea area". Tectonophysics. 271 (4): 191–215. Bibcode:1997Tectp.271..191E. doi:10.1016/S0040-1951(96)00247-8.
- Ahlberg, A.; Goldstein, R.H. (1996). "Fluid inclusions in quartz overgrowths: Evidence of Mid-Jurassic volcanic hot brine flushing at shallow burial depth in the Lower Jurassic Höör Sandstone, southern Sweden". GFF. 118 (4): 104. Bibcode:1996GFF...118R.104A. doi:10.1080/11035899609546426.
- Norling, E.; Ahlberg, A.; Erlström, M.; Sivhed, U. (1993). "Guide to the Upper Triassic and Jurassic geology of Sweden". Sveriges Geologiska Undersökning. 82: 71.
- Bylund, G.; Halvorsen, E. (1993). "Palaeomagnetic study of Mesozoic basalts from Scania, southernmost Sweden". Geophysical Journal International. 114 (1): 138–144. Bibcode:1993GeoJI.114..138B. doi:10.1111/j.1365-246X.1993.tb01473.x.
- Berthelsen, A. (1992). From Precambrian to Variscan Europe. A continent revealed: the European geotraverse. Cambridge: Cambridge University Press. pp. 153–164.
- Liboriussen, J.; Ashton, P.; Tygesen, T. (1987). "The tectonic evolution of the Fennoscandian Border Zone in Denmark". Tectonophysics. 137 (4): 21–29. Bibcode:1987Tectp.137...21L. doi:10.1016/0040-1951(87)90310-6.
- Norling, E.; Bergström, J. (1987). "Mesozoic and Cenozoic tectonic evolution of Scania, southern Sweden". Tectonophysics. 137 (1): 7–19. Bibcode:1987Tectp.137....7N. doi:10.1016/0040-1951(87)90309-X.
- Ringberg, B. (1984). "Cyclic Lamination in Proximal Varves Reflecting the Length of Summers during Late Weichsel in Southernmost Sweden". Climatic Changes on a Yearly to Millennial Basis. Vol. 1. pp. 57–62. doi:10.1007/978-94-015-7692-5_5. ISBN 978-90-481-8399-9.
- Sivhed., U. (1984). "Litho-and biostratigraphy of the Upper Triassic-Middle Jurassic in Scania, southern Sweden" (PDF). Sveriges geologiska undersökning. 78 (4): 1–30.
- Klingspor, I. (1976). "Radiometric age-determination of basalts, dolerites and related syenite in Skåne, southern Sweden". GFF. 98 (1): 195–216. doi:10.1080/11035897609454371.
- Tralau, H. (1973). "En palynologisk åldersbestämning av v ulkanisk aktivitet i Skåne". Fauna och Flora. 68 (1): 121–176.
- Bölau, E.; Kockel-Brosius, M. (1965). "Der tertiäre Vulkanismus in Zentralschonen, Südschweden: Mikropaläontologische Untersuchungen an Bohrproben aus Schonen" (PDF). Gleerup (1): 1–55.
- Nilsson, T. (1958). "Ober das Vorkommen eines mesozoischen Sapropelgesteins in Schonen". Lunds Univ. Arsskrift, N. F. Avd. 54 (10): 1–12.
- Troedsson, Gustaf (1954). "Om lias-sandsteuen vid Brandsberga och Kolleberga". Geologiska Föreningen i Stockholm Förhandlingar. 76 (4): 605–612. doi:10.1080/11035895409453582.
- Troedsson, G. (1948). "On rhythmic sedimentation in the Rhaetic-Liassic beds of Sweden" (PDF). In International Geological Congress.'Report of the Eighteenth Session, Great Britain. 1 (1): 64–72.
- Troedsson, Gustaf T. (1940). "Om Höörs sandsten". Geologiska Föreningen i Stockholm Förhandlingar. 62 (3): 245–283. doi:10.1080/11035894009452796.
- Norin, R. (1934). "Zur geologie der Südschwedischen basalte" (PDF). Meddelanden Fran Lunds Geologisk-Mineralogiska Institution. 103 (1): 1–88.
- Norin, R. (1933). "Mineralogische und Petrologische Studien an den Basalten Schonens". GFF. 52 (1): 101–149. doi:10.1080/11035893309448840.
- Törnebohm, Alfred Elis; Henning, Anders (1904). "Be-skrifning till blad 1 & 2, SGU". Geologische Karte.
- Henning, Anders (1902). "Basalt tuff von Lillö" (PDF). Centralblatt Mineral. Geol. Palaeont. 8 (1): 357–362.
- Kjellen, R. (1902). "Bidrag till Sveriges endogena geografi". Geologiska Föreningen i Stockholm Förhandlingar. 24 (4): 193–220. doi:10.1080/11035890209449951.
- Svedmark, E. (1883). "Mikroskopisk undersökning af dé vid Djupadal i Skåne förekommande basaltbergarterna". Geologiska Föreningen i Stockholm Förhandlingar. 6 (12): 574–582. doi:10.1080/11035898309444104.
- Eichstädt (1883b). "Ytterligare om basalt-tufjen vid Djupadal i Skåne". Geologiska Föreningen i Stockholm Förhandlingar. 6 (14): 774–783. doi:10.1080/11035898309444119.
- Eichstädtat, F. (1883). "Om basalttuffen vid Djupadal i Skåne". Geologiska Föreningen i Stockholm Förhandlingar. 6 (10): 408–415. doi:10.1080/11035898309444082.
- Lundgren, B. (1882). "Undersökningar öfver Molluskfaunan i Sveriges äldre mesozoiska bildningar". Geologiska Föreningen i Stockholm Förhandlingar. 6 (3): 136–137. doi:10.1080/11035898209455546.
- Eichstädt, F. (1882). "Skånes basalter, mikroskopiskt undersökta och beskrifna". Sveriges Geologiska Undersökning. 34 (2): 376–377. doi:10.1080/11035898309444074.
- Tullberg, S.A. (1880). "Meddelande om nya fynd af musslor i Höörssandsten". Geologiska Föreningen i Stockholm Förhandlingar. 7 (5): 315–317. doi:10.1080/11035898009443938.
- Tullberg, S.A.; Nathorst, A.G. (1880). "Meddelande om en växtlemningar innchällande basaltvacka-vid Djupadal i Skåne". Geologiska Föreningen i Stockholm Förhandlingar. 5 (5): 230–232. doi:10.1080/11035898009444984.
