= Skagerrak-Centered Large Igneous Province =

Area of igneous rock in Skagerrak strait

The Skagerrak-Centered Large Igneous Province (SCLIP), also known as the European-Northwest African Large Igneous Province (EUNWA), and Jutland LIP, is a 300 million year old (Ma) large igneous province (LIP) centered on what is today the Skagerrak strait in north-western Europe (57°50′N 9°04′E, paleocoordinates 11°N 16°E (south of Lake Chad)). It was named by Torsvik et al. 2008.

The SCLIP covered an area of at least 0.5×10^{6} km^{2} (0.19×10^{6} sq mi) and includes the Oslo and Skagerrak grabens, areas in south-western Sweden, Scotland, northern England, and the central North Sea. The SCLIP erupted at 297±4 Ma. It produced 228,000 km^{2} of currently exposed volcanic material that can be found in Skagerrak, the Oslo Fjord, central North Sea, North-east Germany; 14,000 km^{2} of sills in Scotland, England, Germany, The Netherlands, and Sweden; and 3,353 km total length of dykes in Scotland, Norway, and Sweden. The period of eruptions comprised a relatively short time span, perhaps less than 4 Ma, but magma propagated more than 1,000 km (620 mi) from the plume centre.

Plumes derived from a superplume (or Large Low Shear Velocity Province (LLSVP)) overlay the boundary of the superplume at the core-mantle boundary (CMB). To test whether the SCLIP met these criteria, Torsvik et al. used a shear-wave tomographic model of the mantle, in which the SCLIP indeed do project down to the margin of the African superplume at the CMB at a depth of 2800 km. A series of LIPs are associated with the African superplume, of which the SCLIP is the oldest: SCLIP (300 Ma), Bachu (275 Ma), Emeishan (260 Ma), Siberian (250 Ma), and Central Atlantic (200 Ma). It is possible that these plumes together caused the break-up of Pangaea and therefore play an important role in the supercontinent cycle.

The SCLIP is associated with the Moscovian and Kasimovian stages of the Carboniferous rainforest collapse around 296-310 Ma together with the Siberian Barguzin-Vitim LIP.

== See also ==
- Avalonia
- List of flood basalt provinces
  - Central Atlantic magmatic province, Late Triassic to Early Jurassic igneous province in the area
  - Central Skåne Volcanic Province, Early Jurassic to Early Cretaceous igneous province in southern Sweden
