= Central Skåne Volcanic Province =

Site of Mesozoic Era volcanic activity in Sweden's Scania region

Coordinates: 55.992928°N 13.520970°E

The Central Skåne Volcanic Province was a site of volcanic activity in the Scania region of Sweden during the Mesozoic Era of the Earth's geological history. The volcanism began with a first and main phase in late Sinemurian to Toarcian times around 191 to 178 Ma. Then volcanism continued sporadically for another 80 million years. More than one hundred volcanic necks of basaltic composition exist in Scania evidencing this volcanism. In central Scania, volcanism was in the form of a volcanic field of cinder cones that had Strombolian eruption styles. These cones produced tuffite deposits made largely of lapilli with rare volcanic bombs. Pyroclastic materials were subsequently palagonitized or largely altered to clay minerals. While eruptions occurred on land the sea was likely very close to the area. Besides purely pyroclastic sediments, lahar deposits have also been identified around the remnants of the volcanoes.

Beneath a lahar deposit at Korsaröd (Djupadal Formation), Early Jurassic plant fossils including wood, pollen and spores have been exceptionally well preserved. The degree of preservation is such that cell-scale features like organelles and chromosomes have been identified in the fossils. At this location plants grew in a substrate with extensive hydrothermal alteration.

The volcanism is possibly the result of decompression melting of the lithospheric mantle beneath. The volcanism is linked to a rift flank fault along the Sorgenfrei–Tornquist Zone, which is a failed rift associated with extension in the North Sea and the opening of the North Atlantic. The background to the volcanism is the break-up of Pangea, and thus it is analogous to the much more voluminous Karoo-Ferrar flood basalts of Southern Africa.

== See also ==
- List of flood basalt provinces
  - Central Atlantic magmatic province, Late Triassic to Early Jurassic igneous province in the area
  - Skagerrak-Centered Large Igneous Province, Late Carboniferous to Early Permian igneous province in Denmark and southern Sweden
- Osmunda regalis
