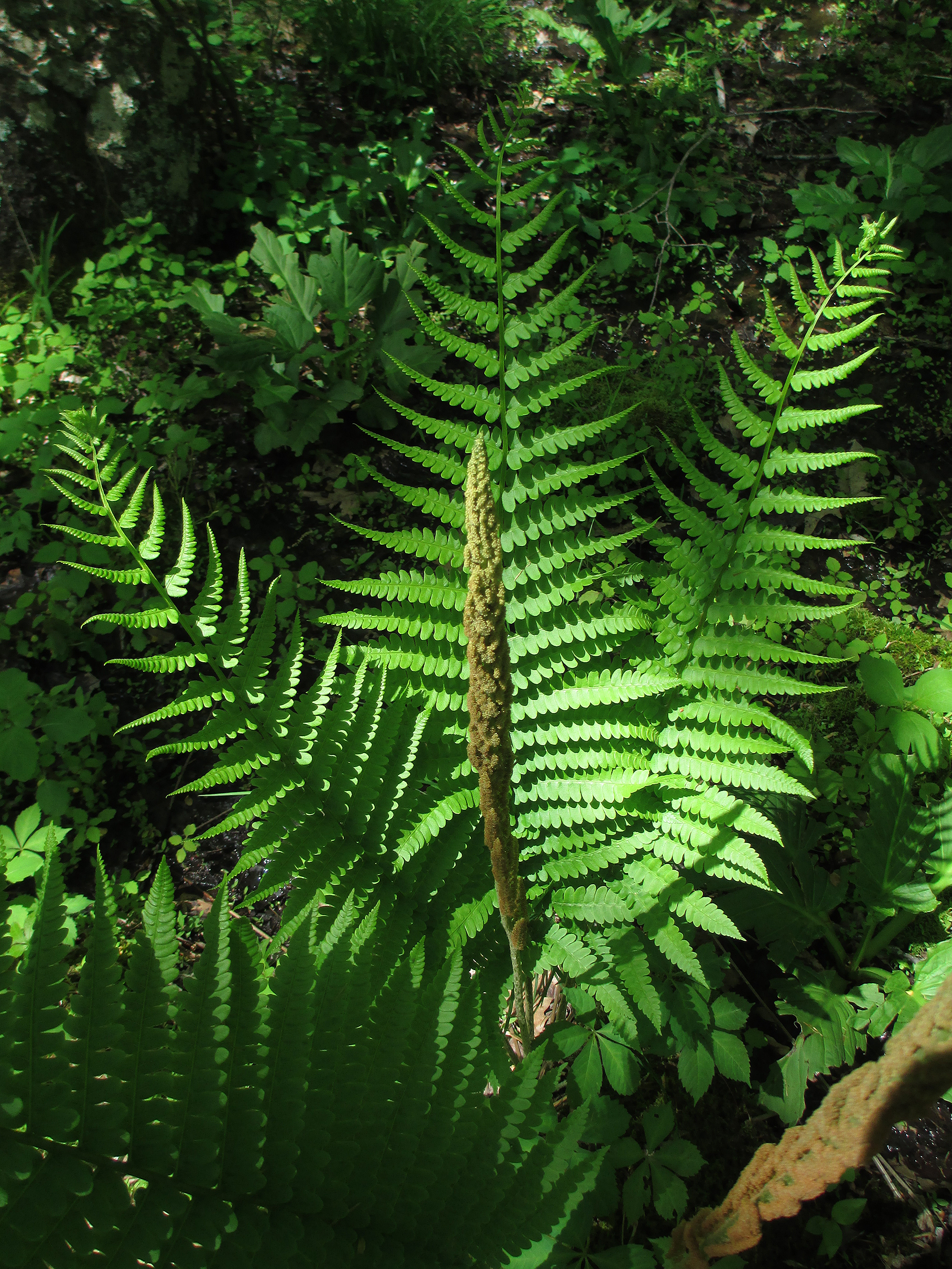
- Developing spore-bearing frond and several sterile fronds in late spring,
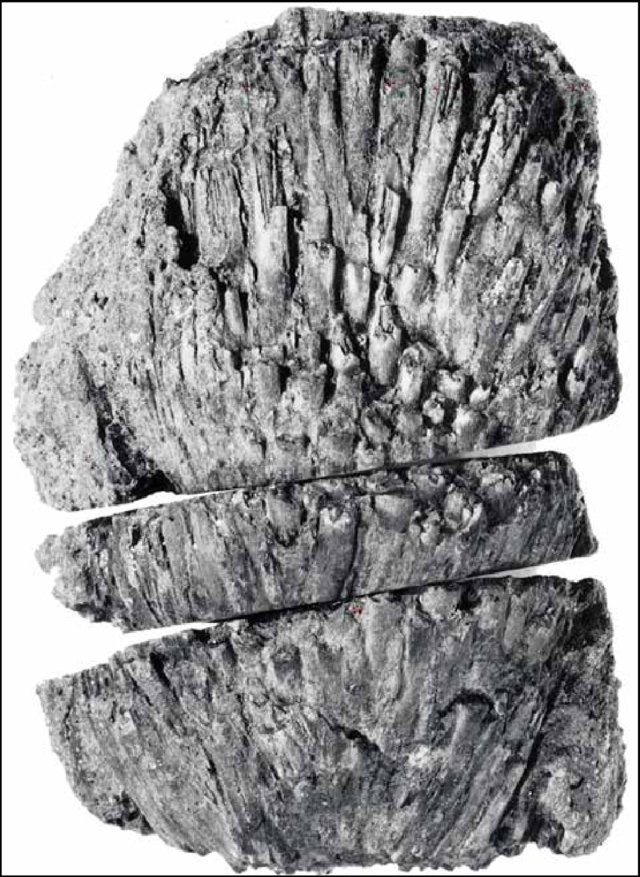
- Fossil of a Osmundastrum Pulchellum rhizome

Scientific classification
- Kingdom: Plantae
- Clade: Tracheophytes
- Division: Polypodiophyta
- Class: Polypodiopsida
- Order: Osmundales
- Family: Osmundaceae
- Genus: Osmundastrum; C.Presl

Type species
- Osmundastrum cinnamomeum (L.) C.Presl

Species
- Osmundastrum cinnamomeum (L.) C.Presl; †Osmundastrum dubiosum (Hollick) Chelebaeva; †Osmundastrum gvozdevae; †Osmundastrum indentatum; †Osmundastrum precinnamomeum(?); †Osmundastrum pulchellum

Synonyms
- Osmunda (Osmundastrum) Presl 1845

= Osmundastrum =

Osmundastrum Temporal range: Norian–Holocene

Genus of ferns

Osmundastrum is genus of leptosporangiate ferns in the family Osmundaceae with one living species, Osmundastrum cinnamomeum, the cinnamon fern. The modern species is native to the Americas and Asia, growing in swamps, bogs and moist woodlands. Fossil records of the genus extend into the Triassic.

== Characteristics ==
Fossil and extant members of the genus Osmundastrum exhibit a high degree of anatomical and morphological consistency, suggesting long-term structural stability within the lineage. Anatomical features such as an ectophloic dictyoxylic siphonostele, homogeneous prosenchymatous pith, and horseshoe-shaped leaf traces are present in both fossil specimens, such as Osmundastrum gvozdevae from the Middle Jurassic of Russia, and the extant species Osmundastrum cinnamomeum. Osmundastrum pulchella from the Jurassic of Sweden had a rhizome structure similar to modern Osmundastrum, including a medullated stele with regularly spaced leaf gaps, sclerenchymatous petioles. Members of this genus are deciduous and herbaceous. The fertile spore-bearing fronds are erect.

== Classification ==
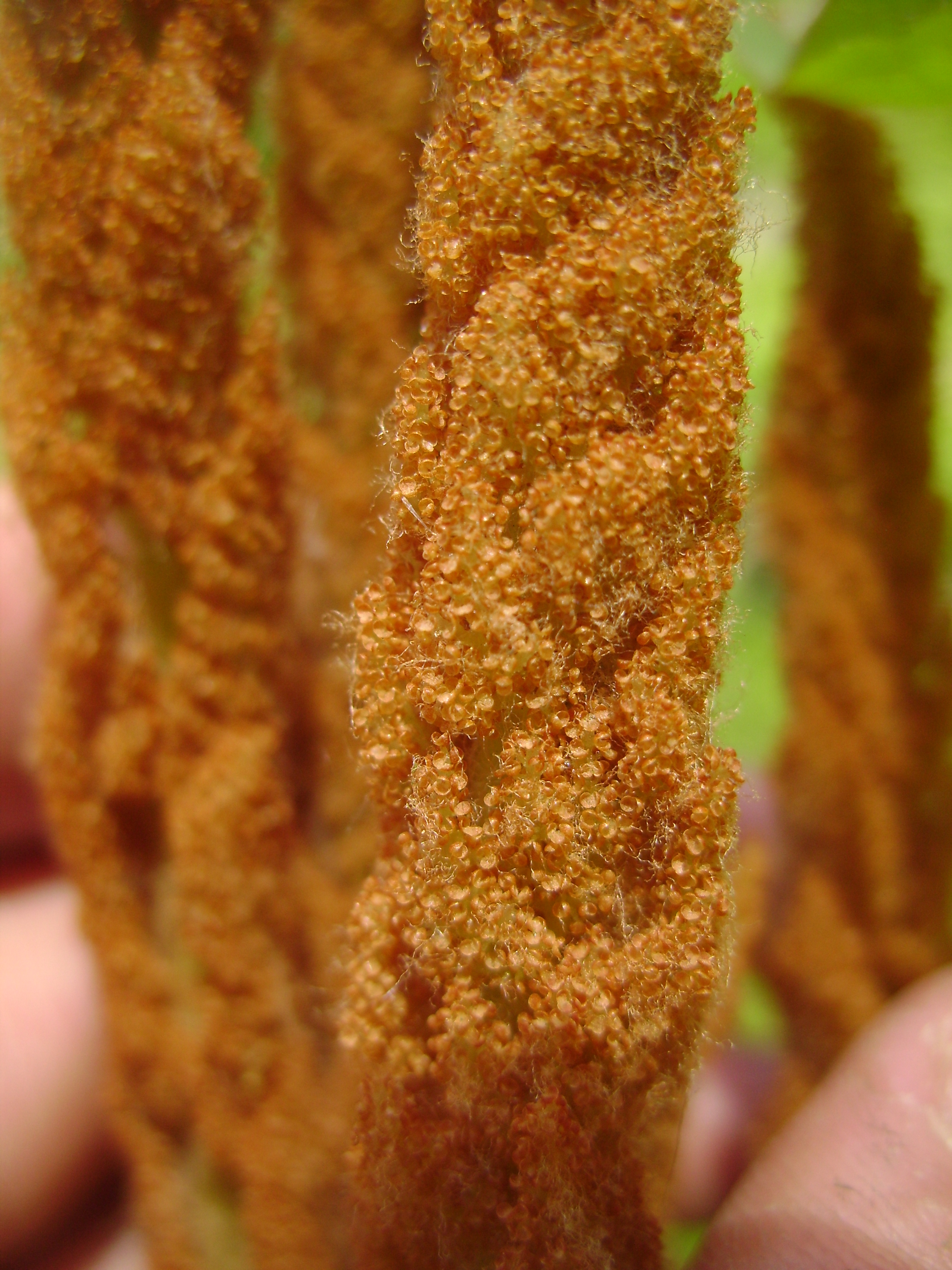
Spore-bearing frond

Traditionally, the members of the genus Osmundastrum have been classified as Osmunda cinnamomea L. However, recent genetic and morphological evidence (Metzgar et al. 2008; Jud et al. 2008) clearly demonstrate that the cinnamon fern is a sister species to the entire rest of the living Osmundaceae. Cladistically, it is either necessary then to include all species of the Osmundaceae, including Todea and Leptopteris in the genus Osmunda, or else it is necessary to segregate the genus Osmundastrum. O. cinnamomeum is the sole living species in the genus, although it is possible that some additional fossils should be assigned to Osmundastrum.

Formerly, some authors included the interrupted fern, Osmunda claytoniana, in the genus or section Osmundastrum, because of its gross apparent morphological similarities. However genetic and morphological studies seem to show it is closer the genus Osmunda and this was shown when it was able to produce a hybrid species with the American Royal Fern while no known hybrids like this exist for Osmundastrum. However, detailed morphology and genetic analysis have proven that the interrupted fern is actually a true Osmunda. This is borne out by the fact that it is known to hybridize with the American royal fern, Osmunda spectabilis to produce Osmunda × ruggii in a family in which hybrids are rare, while Osmundastrum cinnamomeum has no known hybrids.

Osmundastrum cinnamomeum is considered a living fossil because it has been identified in the geologic record as far back as 75 million years ago.

== Fossil distribution ==
Fossil evidence assigned to the genus Osmundastrum indicates a broad prehistoric geographic range extending across multiple continents from the Triassic through the Cretaceous. Fossils identified as either definitive members of Osmundastrum or morphologically consistent with the genus have been recovered from North America, Oceania, Europe, Asia, and Antarctica, suggesting that the lineage was both widespread and ecologically versatile during the Mesozoic. The oldest member of the genus is O. indentatum from the Triassic of Tasmania, Australia. In the Southern Hemisphere, Triassic permineralized rhizomes found in Antarctica and assigned to Ashicaulis woolfei display stem anatomy consistent with early Osmundastrum, including a dictyoxylic siphonostele and stipular frond bases. Although A. woolfei is not definitively placed within the crown group of Osmundastrum, it likely represents a stem lineage, indicating the presence of Osmundastrum-like ferns in high southern latitudes during the Triassic. Despite this extensive prehistoric range, today the genus is represented by a single extant species, Osmundastrum cinnamomeum, which is native to the Americas and parts of Asia. The reduction in species number and geographic contraction likely reflect a combination of environmental, ecological, and evolutionary pressures that took place from the Late Cretaceous through the Cenozoic. One contributing factor appears to be the climatic and ecological shifts that occurred during and after the Cretaceous–Paleogene (K–Pg) boundary. The global climatic cooling and drying trends of the Paleogene would have restricted the moist, temperate habitats favored by osmundaceous ferns. Fossils such as Osmundastrum precinnamomeum from the Paleocene of North America demonstrate that members of the genus were still present shortly after the K–Pg extinction event, but show no evidence of further diversification. This suggests that while Osmundastrum survived the mass extinction, it did not undergo a significant post-Cretaceous radiation. The species also underwent extreme evolutionary conservatism has likely contributed to its survival, but may also explain why the genus did not diversify further or adapt to new environments. The modern species has remained in a state of punctuated equilibrium since the Campanian stage of the Cretaceous.
