= Osmundastrum gvozdevae =

Osmundastrum gvozdevae Temporal range: Middle Jurassic (Bathonian), 165.3 Ma

Scientific classification
- Kingdom: Plantae
- Clade: Tracheophytes
- Division: Polypodiophyta
- Class: Polypodiopsida
- Order: Osmundales
- Family: Osmundaceae
- Genus: Osmundastrum
- Species: †O. gvozdevae

Binomial name
- †Osmundastrum gvozdevae N.V. Bazhenova & A. Bazhenov, 2019

Species of fern

Osmundastrum gvozdevae is an extinct species of royal fern identified from the Upper Bathonian (Middle Jurassic) deposits in the Mikhailovskii Rudnik locality, Kursk Region, in the European part of Russia. The species is known from coalified stems that have retained excellent cellular structure, making it an important discovery for the study of fossil Osmundaceae. It was formally described in 2019 and provisionally assigned to the extant genus Osmundastrum based on its anatomical similarities to modern representative.

== Description ==
The species is known from small, coalified stems that have retained their internal cellular structure. The stem anatomy is characterized by an ectophloic dictyoxylic siphonostele, a common vascular configuration among ferns. The central pith consists of uniform prosenchymatous cells. One of the most distinctive features of Osmundastrum gvozdevae is the presence of endarch xylem in the leaf traces, with protoxylem strands that bifurcate as they traverse the outer cortex. This anatomy suggests a relatively advanced vascular architecture for a Middle Jurassic fern.

Leaf bases in the fossil specimens possess stipular wings and contain horseshoe-shaped vascular bundles. These bundles exhibit two prominent masses of sclerenchyma located on the adaxial (inner) side of the concavity. Additionally, the sclerenchyma rings are heterogeneous, comprising thick-walled fibers that form a clearly defined abaxial arch and two lateral reinforcing masses. These combined traits bear a strong resemblance to the extant cinnamon fern (Osmundastrum cinnamomeum), supporting the authors' decision to assign the fossil provisionally to the same genus.

== Classification ==
Osmundastrum gvozdevae belongs to the family Osmundaceae, which comprises ancient, tree-like ferns commonly known as royal ferns. This family includes both extinct and extant members and is renowned for its remarkably conservative morphology over geological time. The genus Osmundastrum was established to resolve the paraphyly of the older genus Osmunda, based on molecular phylogenetic analyses of plastid DNA sequences. These analyses revealed that species such as Osmunda cinnamomea formed a distinct lineage that warranted recognition as a separate genus. The provisional placement of Osmundastrum gvozdevae within this genus is supported by detailed anatomical similarities with modern representatives.
