= Höör Sandstone =

Geologic formation in Sweden

- Stratigraphic range: Lower Hettangian- Late Pliensbachian; ~200–184 Ma Traditionally dated as Hettangian-Sinemurian only, recent palynology show that the uppermost assemblages are almost identical that the ones recovered in the Late Pliensbachian Sorthat Formation of Bornholm
- Type: Formation
- Sub-units: Stanstorp member; Vittseröd member
- Underlies: Djupadal Formation
- Overlies: Hörby Formation
- Thickness: Up to 50 m (160 ft)

Lithology
- Primary: Sandstone
- Other: Clay and Conglomerate

Location
- Coordinates: 55.98°N 13.63°E
- Approximate paleocoordinates: Approx. 35°N
- Region: Central Skåne County
- Country: Sweden

Type section
- Named for: Höör, Ljungbyhed
- Named by: Nilsson
- Year defined: 1819
- Höör Sandstone (Sweden)

The Höör Sandstone is a geologic formation in Skåne County, southern Sweden. It is Early Jurassic (Hettangian-Pliensbachian) in age. This unit outcrops in central Skane on a few isolated exposures, being traditionally subdivided into the lower “millstone” (“kvarnstenen”) and the upper “buildingstone”. The lowermost layers where also claimed to host Rhaetian strata, however latter works suggested that the layers devolved as red beds, were part of the new Hörby Formation, thus delimitating the Höör sandstone to the lower Jurassic. It has been assumed to be limited to Hettangian-Sinemurian layers, yet recent palynological analysis suggest the uppermost section is of Pliensbachian age, underlying and maybe interacting with the younger volcanic deposits. The Höör sandstone represents a mostly fluvial unit with a rich collection of fossil plants, yet also includes brackish bivalves in some layers, pointing to marine ingressions locally.

== Members ==
=== Stanstorp member ===
This member represents the older layers of the formation, being exposed in the abandoned stanstorpsgraven quarry and in the Vittseröd area. The member is mainly composed by sandstone and has abundant plants fossils, with both allochthonous plant fragments and plant roots indicating vegetation in situ (palaeosols). The layers suggest several types of fluvial and/or coastal depositions, from dunes and river banks to beach deposits, where the palaeocurrent directions are clear generally from the north-east to the south-west. This section hosts abundant conglomerate intercalations, with the lower ones formed by mud fragments and the uppers with distant source material, both abundant on wood fragments, some of them up to 20 cm in diameter.

=== Vittseröd member ===
The youngest member is composed by finer-grained and much better sorted sandstones, with limited abundance of mudstones and plant fragments small and limited to a few horizons. The presence of silt and mature quartz arenites, well sorted and fairly well rounded derived from strongly altered feldspars, shows that this member hosted a high-energy environment, one where tidal currents have been invoked for the modification of fine-grained sandstones, linked with the changes of the Laurasian Seaway. The upper parts of this unit are influenced by the initial pulse of the Pliensbachian coeval vulcanism with heavy volcanic minerals in the uppermost layers.

== Fauna ==
=== Ichnofossils ===
| Color key: Taxon / Reclassified taxon / Taxon falsely reported as present / Dubious taxon or junior synonym / Ichnotaxon / Ootaxon / Morphotaxon | Notes; Uncertain or tentative taxa are in small text; ~~crossed out~~ taxa are discredited. |

- Lockeia siliquaria (Bivalves)
- Planolites annularis (Polychaetes)
- Planolites montanus (Polychaetes)
- Diplichnites isp. (Xiphosurans, Insects, Arachnids)
- Teichichnus isp. (Polychaetes, Echiurans, Holothurians.)
- Skolithos isp. (Polychaetes, Phoronidans)
- Monocraterion tentaculatum (Polychaeta, Sipuncula, Enteropneustans & Echiurans)
- Rhizocorallium isp. (Polychaeta, Sipuncula, Enteropneustans & Echiurans)
- Aulichnites isp. (Gastropods)
- Diplocraterion parallelum (Polychaeta, Sipuncula, Enteropneustans & Echiurans)

=== Bivalves ===
| Genus | Species | Location | Stratigraphic position | Material | Notes | Images |
|---|---|---|---|---|---|---|
| Avicula | A. inaequivalvis | Vittseröd | Vittseröd member | Isolated Shells | A Scallop, member of Pectinidae inside Pectinida. The local material assigned to this genus is now lost | |
| Cardinia | C. follini | Stanstorp; Vittseröd; Dagstorp | Vittseröd member | Isolated Shells | A clam, member of Cardiniidae inside Carditida. This faunal aggrupation occurs together with abundant foliar remains and are equivalent to the Brandsberga erratics, which was closer to the mouth of the bay developed in the region, as it proves the find on its sandstone of more clear marine fauna. | |
| Liostrea | L. hisingeri | Vittseröd | Vittseröd member | Isolated Shells | An oyster, member of Ostreidae inside Ostreida. The most common Bivalve found locally, indicator of increased salinity levels on the Hettangian layers. | Example of Liostrea specimens |
| Pecten | P. sp. | Vittseröd | Vittseröd member | Isolated Shells | A Scallop, member of Pectinidae inside Pectinida. | Example of extant Pecten |

=== Arthropoda ===
| Genus | Species | Location | Stratigraphic position | Material | Notes | Images |
|---|---|---|---|---|---|---|
| Angelinella | A. angelini | Kulla Gunnarstorp | Stanstorp Member | Elytrons | A beetle, incertae sedis Archostemata inside Coleoptera. | |
| Mesolimulus | M.? nathorsti | Stanstorp | Vittseröd Member | SMNH Ar33179, a possible prosomal section | A horseshoe crab, member of the Limulidae inside Xiphosura. This fragment has been considered to be a Limulus or Mesolimulus prosomal shield, but due to the limited and fragmentary nature some authors referred to it as ?Chelicerata incertae sedis. | Mesolimulus from Germany |
| Paracurculionites | P. parvulus | North of Sofiero | Stanstorp Member | Elytrons | A beetle, incertae sedis Archostemata inside Coleoptera. | |

== Flora ==
| Genus | Species | Stratigraphic position | Member | Material | Notes | Images |
|---|---|---|---|---|---|---|
| Anomozamites | A. minor; A. intermedium | Vittseröd; Stanstorpsgraven; Per Pålssons grav; Ormanäsgraven; Kullans stenbrott | Vittseröd Member | Leaflets | Affinities with Williamsoniaceae inside Bennettitales. | |
| Ctenis | C. nilssonii; C. minuta; C. latepinnata; C. laxa | Vittseröd; Stanstorpsgraven; Per Pålssons grav | Vittseröd Member | Leaflets | Affinities with Cycadales inside Cycadopsida. | Ctenis specimen |
| Cladophlebis | C. svedbergii; C. scoresbyensis; C. cf. nebbensis; C. cf. spectabilis; C. arguta; C. sublobata; C. sewardii; C. divaricata | Stanstorpsgraven; Ormanäsgraven; Kullans stenbrott; Dagstorp | Stanstorp Member | Isolated pinnae | Affinities with Osmundaceae inside Osmundales. | Cladophlebis nebbensis specimen |
| Clathropteris | C. meniscioides | Vittseröd; Stanstorpsgraven; Per Pålssons grav; Ormanäsgraven; Kullans stenbrott | Stanstorp Member; Vittseröd Member | Isolated pinnae | Affinities with Dipteridaceae inside Polypodiales. | Example of Clathropteris meniscioides specimen |
| Cycadolepis | C. giganteus; C. blomquisti | Vittseröd; Stanstorpsgraven; Per Pålssons grav | Vittseröd Member | Leaflets | Affinities with Cycadeoidaceae inside Bennettitales. | |
| Dictyophyllum | D. exile | Stanstorpsgraven; Ormanäsgraven; Kullans stenbrott | Stanstorp Member | Isolated pinnae | Affinities with Dipteridaceae inside Polypodiales. Dictyophyllum is a common Dipteridacean genus of the mid-Mesozoic | Dictyophyllum nilssonii specimen |
| Elatocladus | E. cephalotaxoides; E. conferta | Vittseröd; Stanstorpsgraven; Per Pålssons grav; Ormanäsgraven; Kullans stenbrott | Stanstorp Member; Vittseröd Member | Fragmentary axis compressions with preserved leaves | Affinities with Sequoioideae inside Cupressales. | Elatocladus specimen |
| Equisetites | E. laevis; E. gracilis | Ormanäsgraven; Stanstorpsgraven; Per Pålssons grav | Stanstorp Member | Stems | Affinities with Equisetaceae inside Equisetales. | Example of Equisetites specimen |
| Ginkgoites | G. troedsonii; G. obovatus; G. marginatus | Vittseröd; Stanstorpsgraven; Per Pålssons grav; Ormanäsgraven; Kullans stenbrott | Stanstorp Member; Vittseröd Member | Leave Compressions | Affinities with Ginkgoaceae inside Ginkgoales. | Ginkgoites specimen |
| Hausmannia | H. forchhammeri; H. dentata; H. lasciniata | Vittseröd; Stanstorpsgraven; Per Pålssons grav; Ormanäsgraven; Kullans stenbrott | Stanstorp Member; Vittseröd Member | Isolated pinnae | Affinities with Dipteridaceae inside Polypodiales. | Example of Hausmannia specimen |
| Lepidopteris | L. ottonis | Stanstorpsgraven; Ormanäsgraven | Stanstorp Member | Isolated pinnae | Affinities with Peltaspermaceae inside Pteridospermatophyta. Indicator or reworked Rahetian layers. | |
| Nilssonia | N. münsteri; N. acuminata | Vittseröd; Stanstorpsgraven; Per Pålssons grav | Vittseröd Member | Leaflets | Affinities with Cycadeoidaceae inside Bennettitales. | Nilssonia specimen |
| Peltaspermum | P. rotula | Stanstorpsgraven; Ormanäsgraven | Stanstorp Member; Vittseröd Member | Isolated pinnae | Affinities with Umkomasiaceae inside Pteridospermatophyta. | |
| Podozamites | P. lanceolatus; P. angustifolius; P. cuspiformis | Vittseröd; Stanstorpsgraven; Per Pålssons grav; Ormanäsgraven; Kullans stenbrott | Stanstorp Member; Vittseröd Member | Isolated Leaves | Affinities with Krassiloviaceae inside Voltziales. The local Podozamites show a rather great range of growth, reflecting tropical to subtropical conditions. | Podozamites reconstruction |
| Ptilozamites | P. blasii; P. carlsonii; P. heeri; P. nilssonii | Vittseröd; Stanstorpsgraven; Per Pålssons grav; Ormanäsgraven; Kullans stenbrott | Stanstorp Member; Vittseröd Member | Isolated pinnae | Affinities with Umkomasiaceae inside Pteridospermatophyta. | Ptilozamites specimen |
| Pseudoctenis | P. florinii | Vittseröd; Stanstorpsgraven; Per Pålssons grav | Vittseröd Member | Leaflets | Affinities with Cycadeoidaceae inside Bennettitales. | |
| Pterophyllum | P. majus; P. kochii; P. aequale; P. ptilum; P. compressum | Vittseröd; Stanstorpsgraven; Per Pålssons grav | Vittseröd Member | Leaflets | Affinities with Williamsoniaceae inside Bennettitales. In the uppermost layers is the dominant macroflora outside Pelmastermales | Example of Pterophyllum specimen |
| Rhizomopteris | R. cruciata | Stanstorpsgraven; Ormanäsgraven; Kullans stenbrott | Stanstorp Member; Vittseröd Member | Isolated pinnae | Affinities with Dipteridaceae inside Polypodiales. | |
| Sagenopteris | S. nilssoniana; S. rhoifolia; S. undulata | Vittseröd; Stanstorpsgraven; Per Pålssons grav; Ormanäsgraven; Kullans stenbrott | Stanstorp Member; Vittseröd Member | Isolated pinnae | Affinities with Caytoniaceae inside Pteridospermatophyta. | Sagenopteris specimen |
| Schizolepis | S. hörensis | Vittseröd; Stanstorpsgraven; Per Pålssons grav; Ormanäsgraven; Kullans stenbrott | Stanstorp Member; Vittseröd Member | Ovulate Strobili | Affinities with Schizolepisaceae inside Pinaceae. Associated with Pinaceae thanks to the presence of separated seen scales and bract scales. | |
| Stachyotaxus | S. septentrionalis; S. elegans | Vittseröd; Stanstorpsgraven; Per Pålssons grav; Ormanäsgraven; Kullans stenbrott | Stanstorp Member; Vittseröd Member | Isolated Leaves | Affinities with Palissyaceae inside Palissyales. | Stachyotaxus specimens |
| Stenorachis | S. dubius | Vittseröd; Stanstorpsgraven; Per Pålssons grav; Ormanäsgraven; Kullans stenbrott | Stanstorp Member; Vittseröd Member | Reproductive Organs | Affinities with Czekanowskiales inside Ginkgoales. | |
| Thaumatopteris | T. schenkii; T. brauniana | Vittseröd; Stanstorpsgraven; Per Pålssons grav; Ormanäsgraven; Kullans stenbrott | Stanstorp Member; Vittseröd Member | Isolated pinnae | Affinities with Dipteridaceae inside Polypodiales. | |
| Todites | T. goeppertianus | Stanstorpsgraven; Ormanäsgraven; Kullans stenbrott | Stanstorp Member | Isolated pinnae | Affinities with Osmundaceae inside Osmundales. | |
| Wielandiella | W. punctata; W. angustifolia | Stanstorpsgraven | Stanstorp Member | Female Bennetite "flower" | Affinities with Williamsoniaceae inside Bennettitales. Wielandiella may be regarded as a fossil taxon characterized by bennettitalean shrubs with branched stems and a divaricate architecture | |
