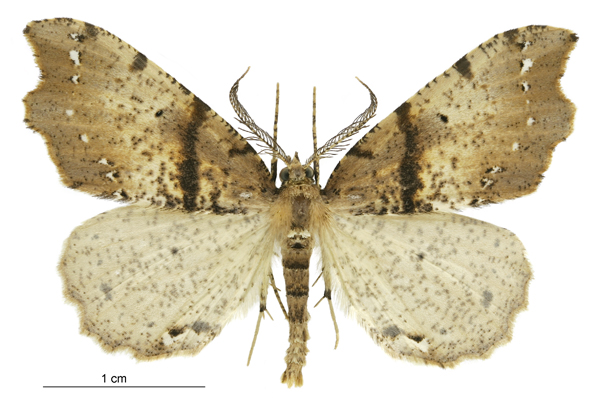
- Male
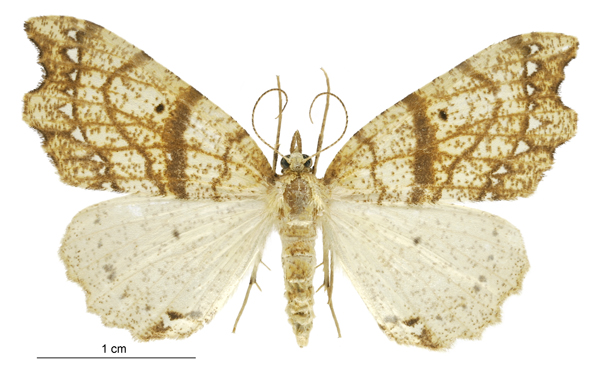
- Female

Scientific classification
- Kingdom: Animalia
- Phylum: Arthropoda
- Clade: Pancrustacea
- Class: Insecta
- Order: Lepidoptera
- Family: Geometridae
- Genus: Chalastra
- Species: C. pellurgata

Binomial name
- Chalastra pellurgata Walker, 1862

Synonyms
- Chalastra pelurgata Meyrick, 1884; Selidosema pelurgata (Meyrick, 1884); Selidosema pellurgata (Walker, 1862); Itama cinerascens Felder & Rogenhofer, 1875; Chalastra cinerascens (Felder & Rogenhofer, 1875); Stratocleis streptophora Meyrick, 1883

= Chalastra pellurgata =

Species of moth, endemic to New Zealand

Chalastra pellurgata, also known as the brown fern moth or the pale fern looper, is a moth of the family Geometridae. This species was first described by Francis Walker in 1862. It is endemic to New Zealand and can be found throughout the country. It inhabits native forest. This species is extremely variable both in its larval and adult life stage. Larvae of this species are active during spring and summer. They feed on the fronds of fern species. C. pellurgata pupates by forming a thin cocoon on the soil amongst leaf litter and moss. Adults are on the wing throughout the year but are most common from September to March. During the day adult moths can be observed resting on dead fern fronds. They become active from dusk and are attracted to light.

== Taxonomy ==
This species was first described by Francis Walker in 1862 using a specimen collected in Nelson by T. R. Oxley and named Chalastra pellurgata. In 1875 Cajetan von Felder and Alois Friedrich Rogenhofer, thinking they were describing a new species, named this species Itama cinerascens. In May 1884 Edward Meyrick, thinking he was also describing a new species, named this species Stratocleis streptophora. Later in 1884 and in more detail in 1885 Meyrick discussed this species under the name C. pelurgata. This was an unjustified emendation. In those publications Meyrick synonymised both Itama cinerascens and Stratocleis streptophora into C. pelurgata. In 1898 George Hudson described and illustrated this species under the name C. pelurgata following Meyrick. In 1917 Meyrick, again using the epithet pelurgata, placed the species in the genus Selidosema. In 1928 Hudson illustrated and discussed the species, again following Meyrick, using the name Selidosema pelurgata. In 1988 John S. Dugdale placed this species back into the genus Chalastra and discussed Meyrick's unjustified emendation of the species epithet. This placement was accepted in the New Zealand Inventory of Biodiversity. The female holotype is held at the Natural History Museum, London.

== Description ==
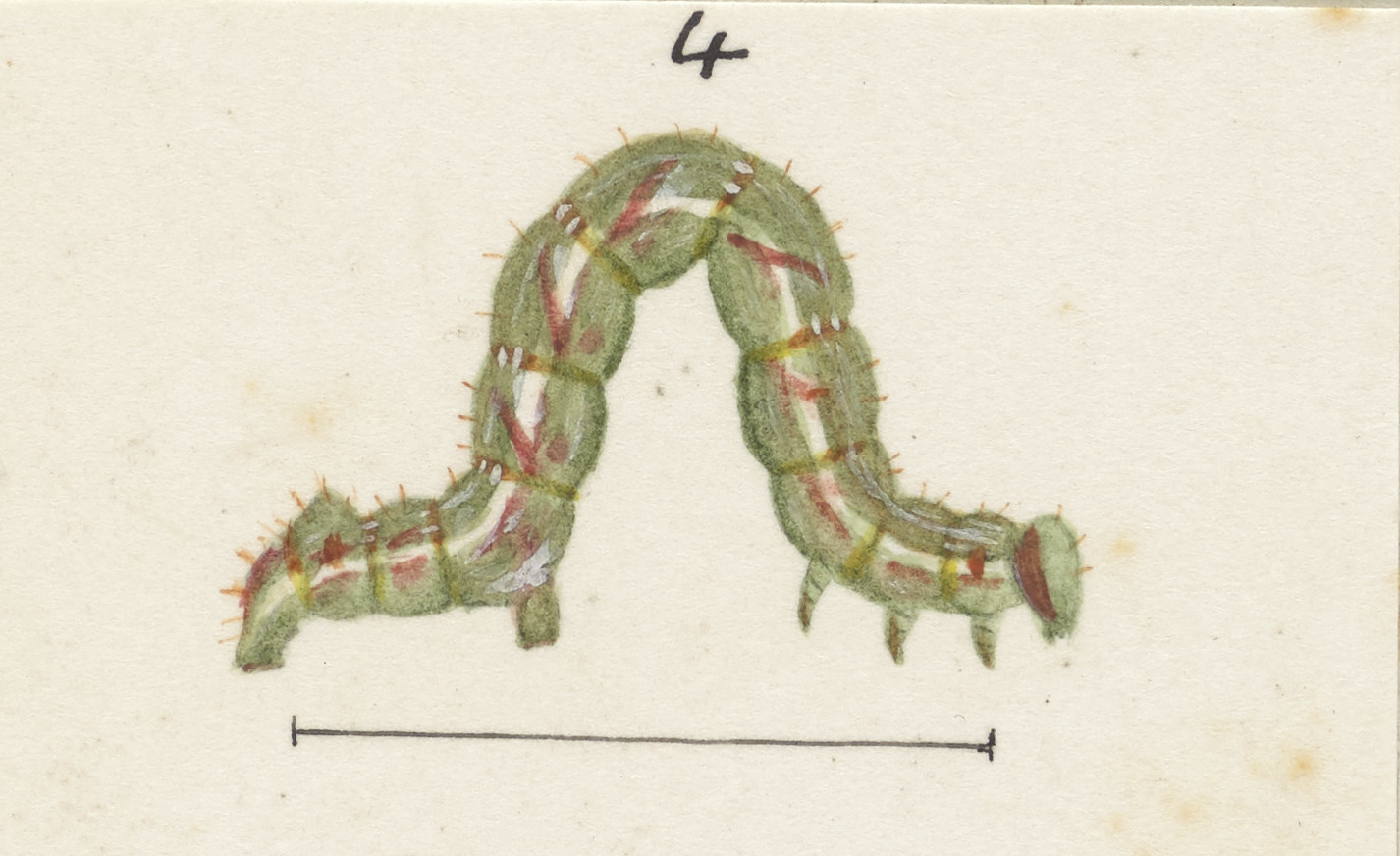
Illustration of larva by Hudson.

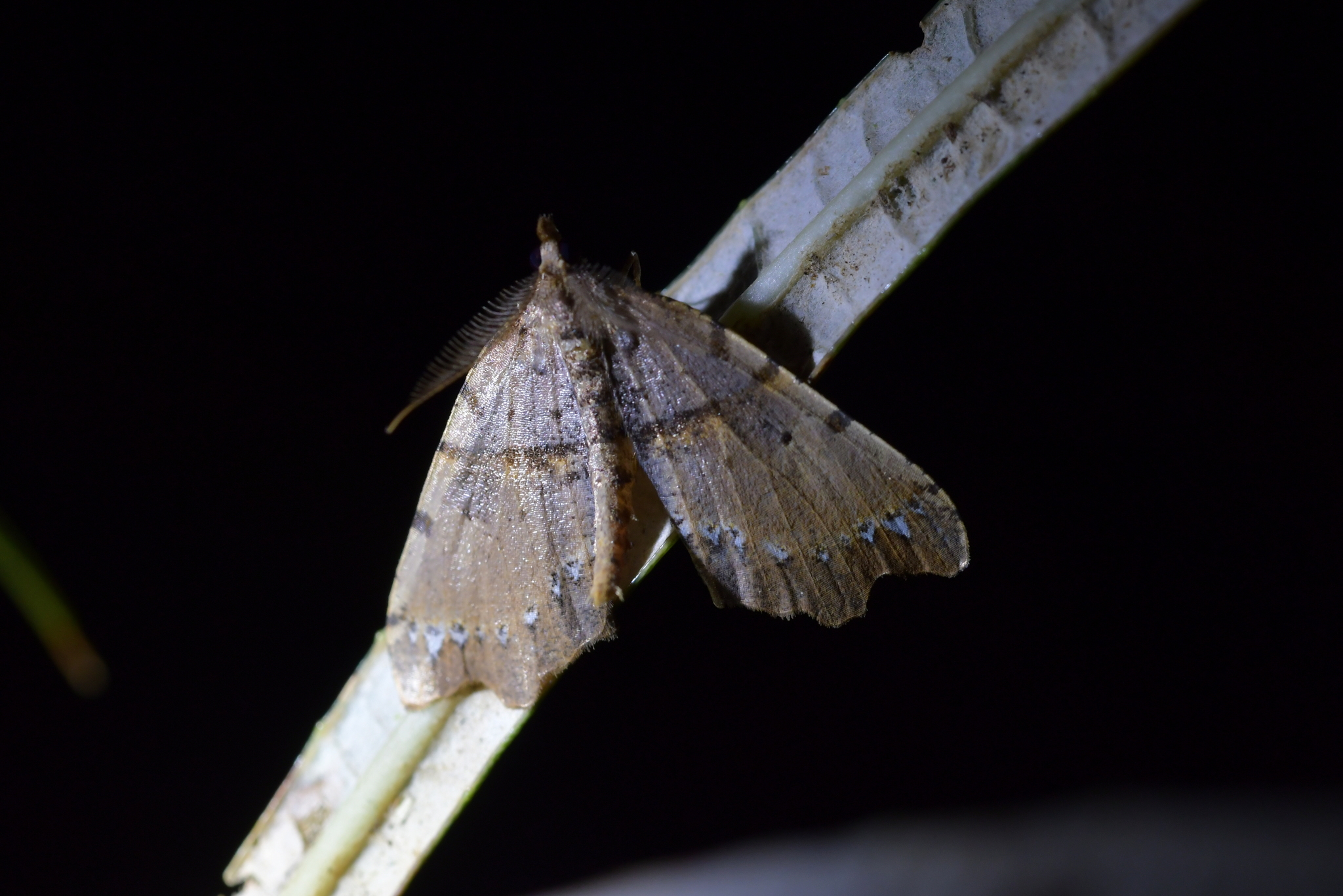
Darker male C. pellurgata.

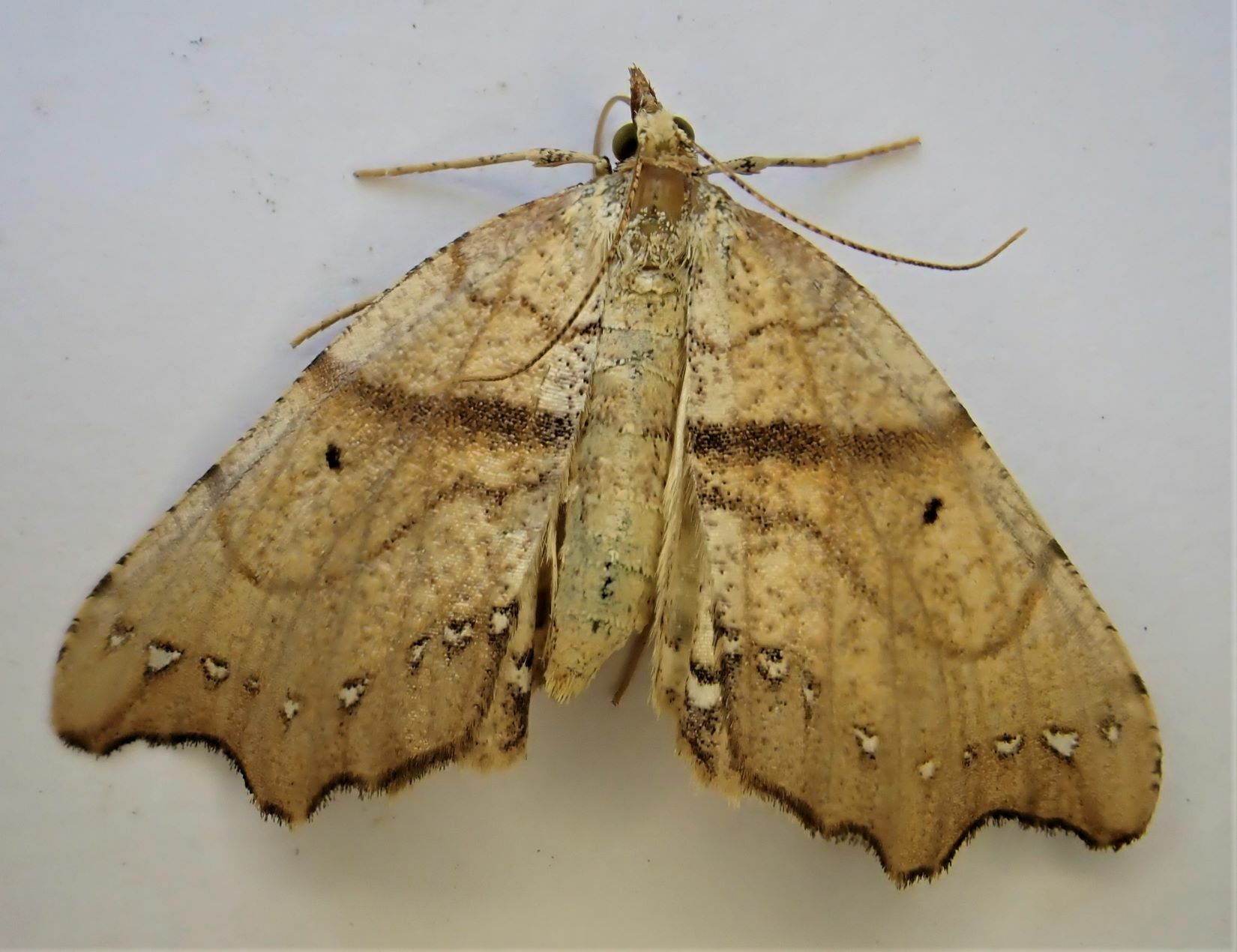
Lighter female C. pellurgata.

Hudson described the egg of C. pellurgata as follows:

The egg, which is laid flat, is oval slightly flattened, deep bronzy-green, with a slight depression on the side, and numerous indistinct shallow hexagonal depressions.

The larvae of this moth were described by Hudson as being:

about 1 1/4 inches in length and very variable; some specimens are dull brown, with a row of green or pale brown crescentic spots down each side, and a dark brown line down the back; others are bright green, with a diagonal reddish-brown stripe on the side of each segment; the segmental divisions are reddish-brown, intersected by numerous very minute whitish lines.

C. pellurgata larvae pupate on the surface of the soil under their host plants in a loose cocoon.

Hudson described this species as follows:

The expansion of the wings is about 1 3/8 inches. The forewings of the male vary from orange-brown to pale yellowish of pale slaty-brown; there is a doubly curved dark brown transverse line near the base; a broad straight line a little before the middle; an angulated line a little beyond the middle, and a curved subterminal line, usually composed of a series of triangular white dots, edged with dark brown; all these lines are much stronger on the costa, and are sometimes almost obliterated elsewhere. The hind-wings are pale yellow or whitish, with several brown-edged white spots near the tornus. The apex of the fore-wing is considerably produced, and there is a large rounded projection on the middle of the termen. The termen of the hind-wings is distinctly indented. In the female the fore-wings are pale yellow or orange, the transverse lines and white spots are usually more conspicuous, and the projections and indentations on the termen of the fore- and hind-wings larger.

Hudson pointed out that this is an extremely variable species, with some male specimens being darker and marked with purplish-brown patches in comparison to the pale orange-brown variety. Although these specimens may appear to be a separate species, a series of specimens shows intermediate forms that connect the two extremes in colouration. The female of the species also vary but tend to be lighter than the males. Both the male and female have four dark lines across the forewing but these tend to be more visible in the female of the species with the forewings of the male only showing the first, third and fourth of these lines towards the leading edge of the wing.

== Distribution ==
This species is endemic to New Zealand. It is found throughout New Zealand.

== Habitat ==
This species inhabits native forest and has been commonly found in dense forest ravines.

== Life history and behaviour ==
The egg of this species usually hatches after approximately three weeks. Larvae of this species are active during spring and summer. This species pupates on the soil amongst leaf litter and moss forming a thin cocoon in which to do so. Adults are on the wing throughout the year but are most common from September to March. They are active from dusk and are attracted to light. During the day adult moths can be observed resting on dead fern fronds and at night have been observed feeding on the blossoms of Metrosideros perforata.

== Host species ==
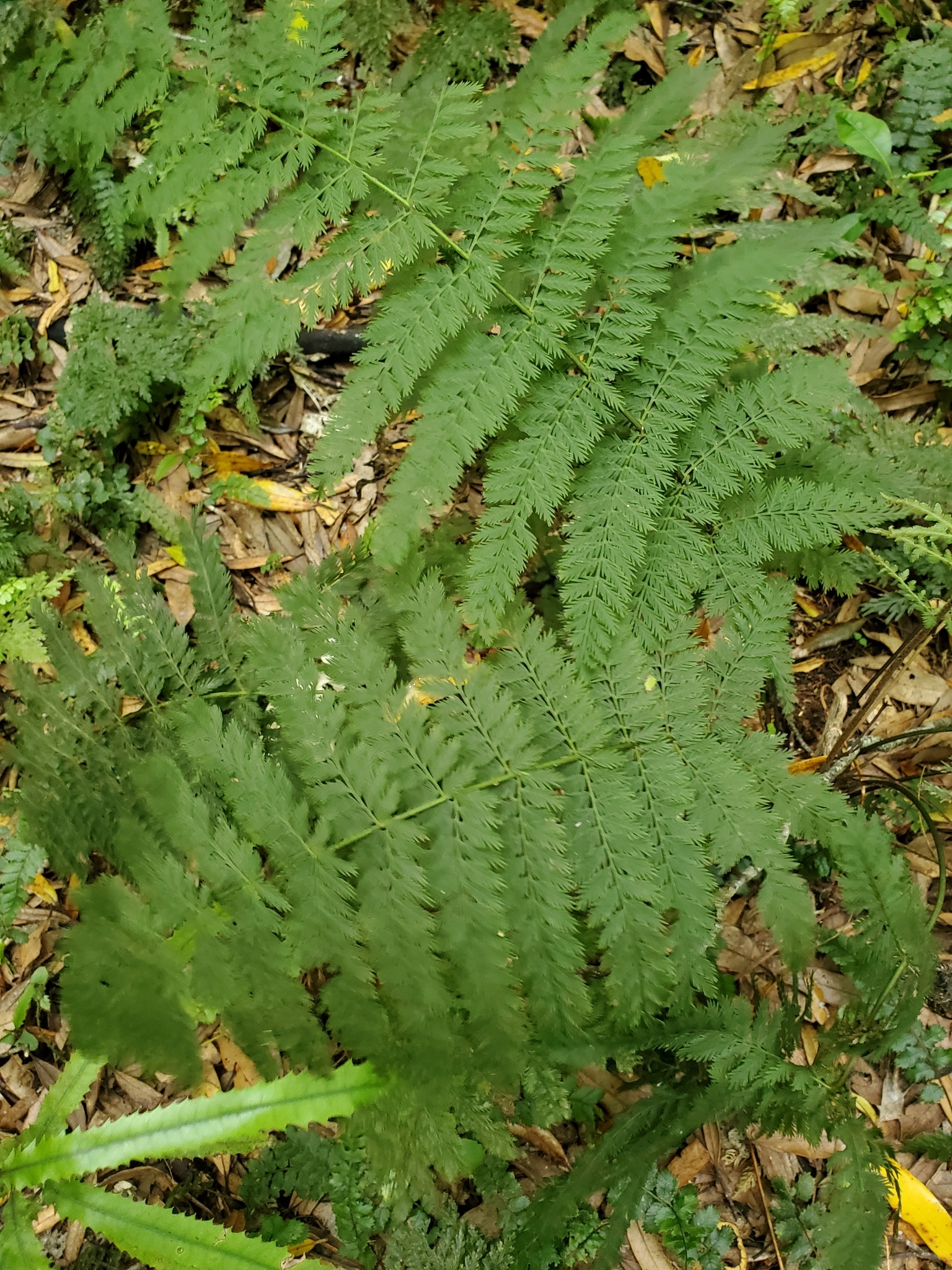
Larval host plant Leptopteris hymenophylloides.

The larvae feed on the fronds of fern species including Leptopteris hymenophylloides, Leptopteris superba, Adiantum cunninghamii, Polystichum vestitu, Alsophila smithii, and the silver fern.
