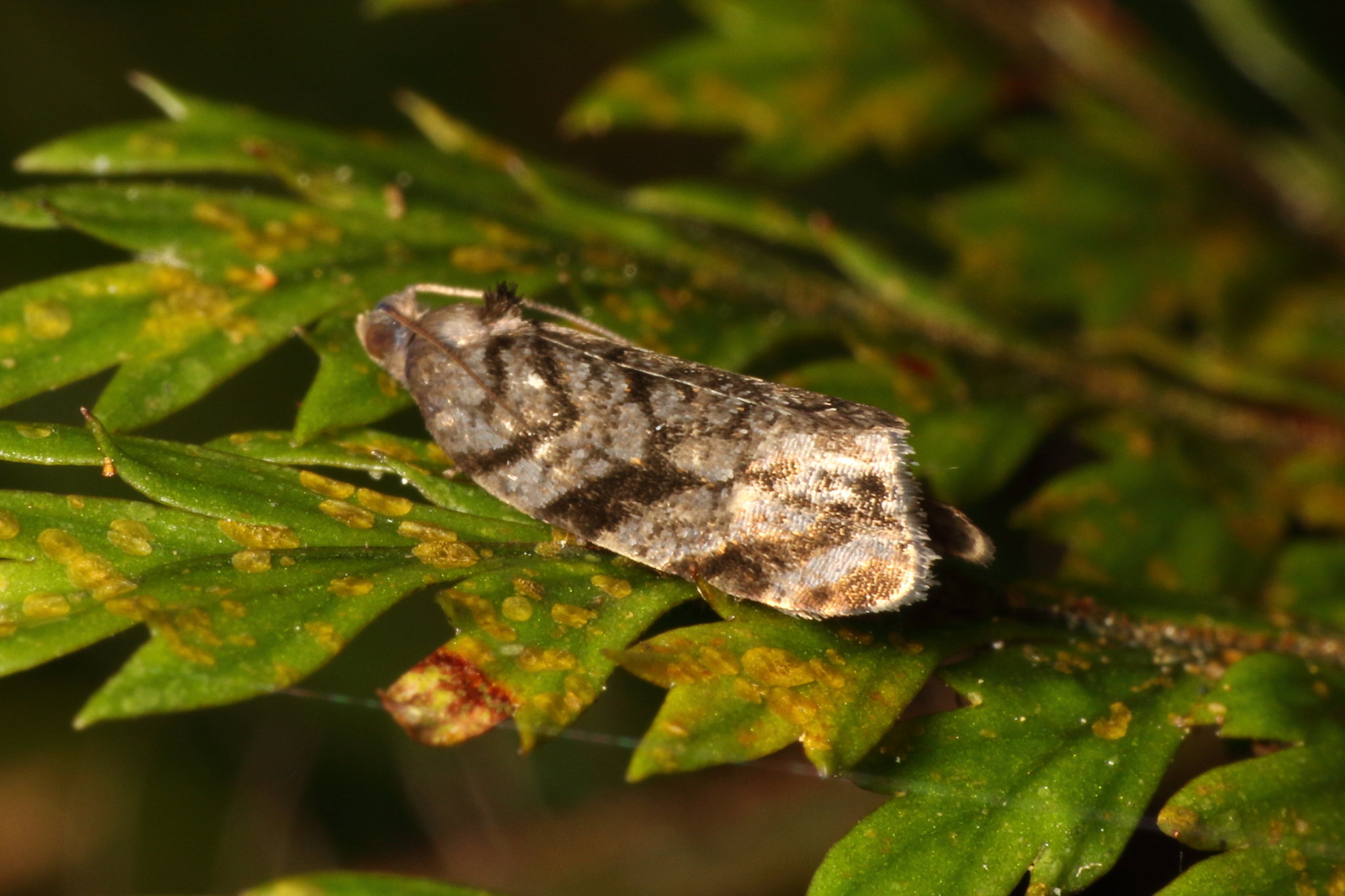

Scientific classification
- Kingdom: Animalia
- Phylum: Arthropoda
- Class: Insecta
- Order: Lepidoptera
- Family: Tortricidae
- Genus: Ecclitica
- Species: E. hemiclista

Binomial name
- Ecclitica hemiclista (Meyrick, 1905)

Synonyms
- Dipterina hemiclista Meyrick, 1905

= Ecclitica hemiclista =

Species of moth endemic to New Zealand

Ecclitica hemiclista is a species of moth of the family Tortricidae. It was first described by Edward Meyrick in 1905 and is endemic to New Zealand and has been observed in the North Island. This species inhabits native forest and adults are on the wing from November until January. This moth is regarded as being rare.

== Taxonomy ==
This species was first described by Edward Meyrick using a specimen collected in Wellington and was originally named Dipterina hemiclista. In 1923 Meyrick placed this species in the genus Ecclitica. In 1928 George Hudson discussed and illustrated this species in his book The butterflies and moths of New Zealand. Also in 1928 Alfred Philpott studied and illustrated the male genitalia of this species. The male holotype specimen is held at the Natural History Museum, London.

== Description ==
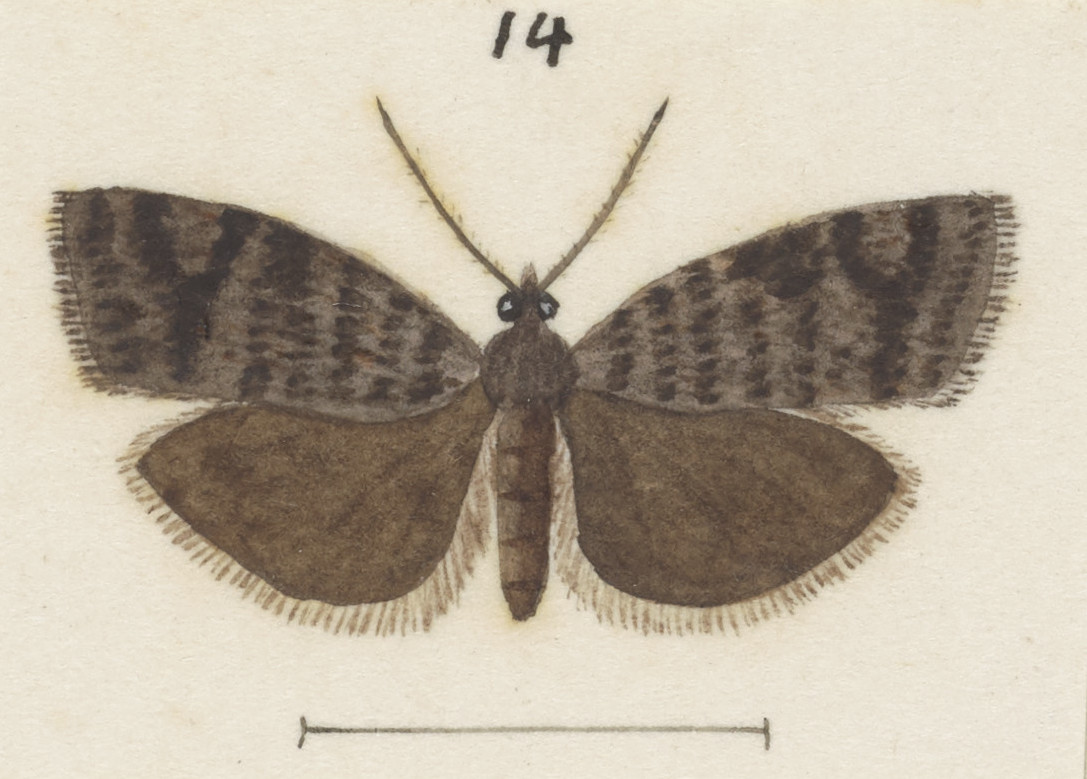
Illustration of female.

Meyrick described this species as follows:

♂. 15 mm. Head, palpi, and thorax grey mixed with dark fuscous, palpi short, 1 1/2. Fore-wings elongate, considerably dilated posteriorly, costa gently arched, apex obtuse, termen obliquely rounded; rather dark slaty-grey, with irregular angulated dark fuscous striae, tending to break up into strigulae; edge of basal patch dark fuscous, right-angled in middle; an oblique dark fuscous blotch on costa before middle, another at 2/3, and a third apical: cilia grey mixed with dark fuscous. Hind-wings fuscous, darker posteriorly.

Hudson stated E. hemiclista resembled Tortrix molybditis but that the former could be distinguished from the latter as a result of E. hemiclista's larger size and paler colouration.

== Distribution ==
E. hemiclista is endemic to New Zealand. It has been observed in the North Island. Hudson regarded this moth as being rare.

== Habitat ==
This species inhabits native forest.

== Behaviour ==
Adults of this species are on the wing from November until January.
