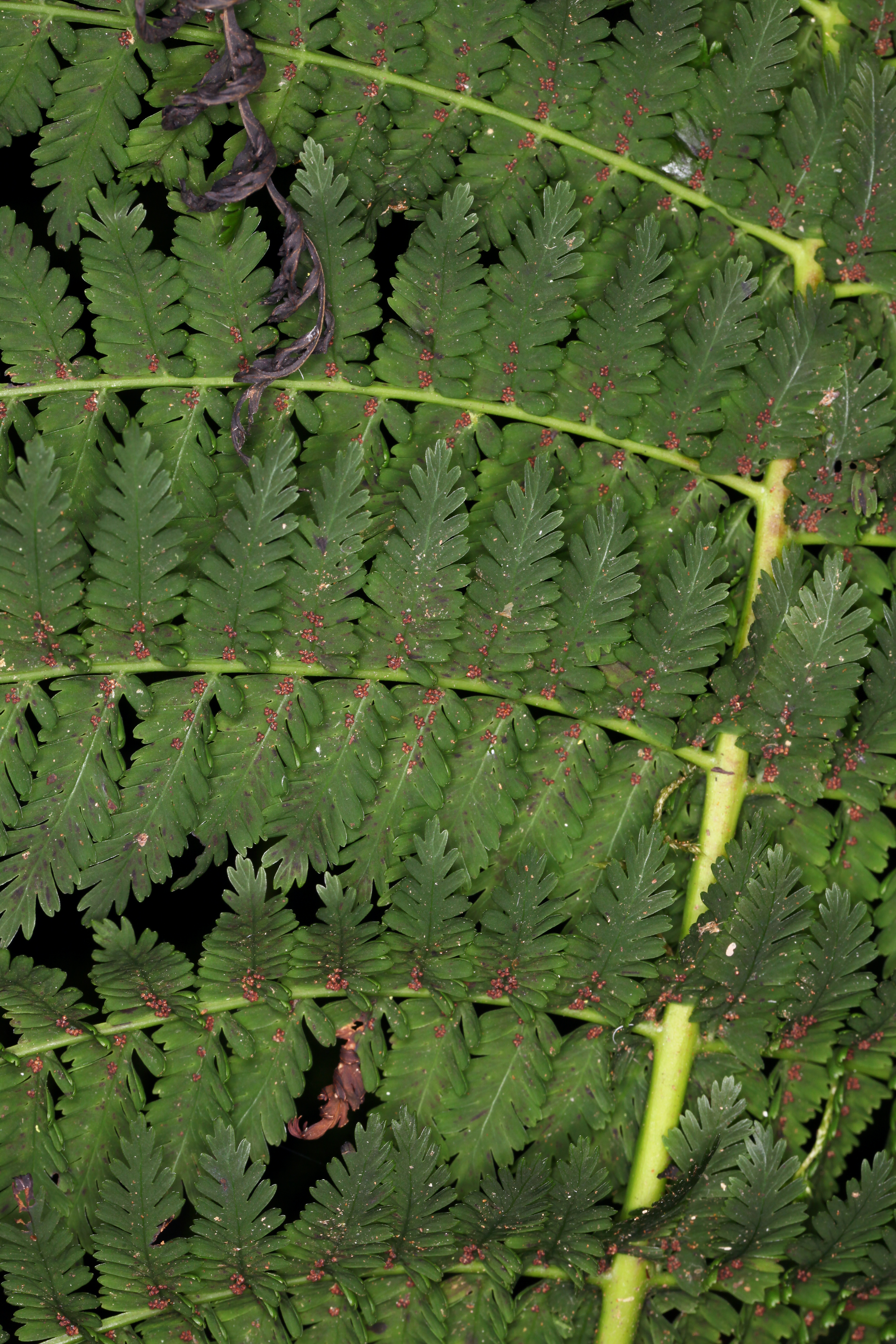

Scientific classification
- Kingdom: Plantae
- Clade: Tracheophytes
- Division: Polypodiophyta
- Class: Polypodiopsida
- Order: Osmundales
- Family: Osmundaceae
- Genus: Leptopteris
- Species: L. moorei

Binomial name
- Leptopteris moorei (Baker) Christ (1897)

Synonyms
- Todea moorei Baker (1873)

= Leptopteris moorei =

Species of plant

Leptopteris moorei is a fern in the family Osmundaceae. The specific epithet honours Charles Moore, Director of the Royal Botanic Gardens in Sydney from 1849 to 1896, who collected plants on Lord Howe Island in 1869.

== Description ==
The fern has a 20–30 cm high trunk. Its 2- or 3-pinnatifid fronds are 0.5–1 m long and 30–45 cm wide.

== Distribution and habitat ==
The fern is endemic to Australia’s subtropical Lord Howe Island in the Tasman Sea; it only occurs on the summit of Mount Gower at the southern end of the island.
