= Todea papuana =

Scientific classification
- Kingdom: Plantae
- Clade: Tracheophytes
- Division: Polypodiophyta
- Class: Polypodiopsida
- Order: Osmundales
- Family: Osmundaceae
- Genus: Todea
- Species: T. papuana

Binomial name
- Todea papuana Hennipman

Species of fern

Todea papuana, the Papuan king fern is a species of fern known only from Papua-New Guinea. It is a rather large species up to 2 m (7 feet) tall, with sporangia borne on the leaves.
