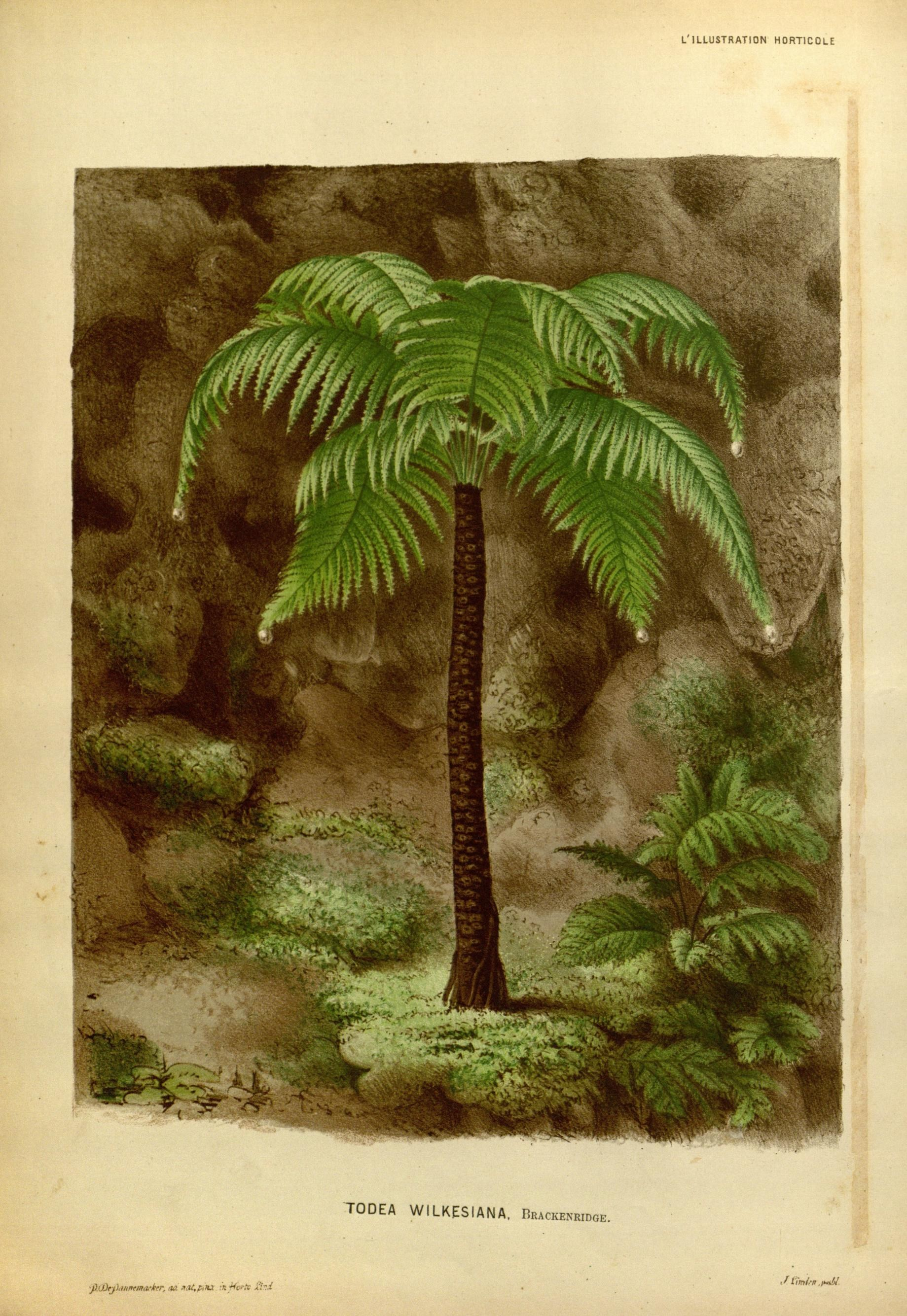

Scientific classification
- Kingdom: Plantae
- Clade: Tracheophytes
- Division: Polypodiophyta
- Class: Polypodiopsida
- Order: Osmundales
- Family: Osmundaceae
- Genus: Leptopteris
- Species: L. wilkesiana

Binomial name
- Leptopteris wilkesiana (Brack.) Gower (1874)

Synonyms
- Todea wilkesiana Brack. (1854)

= Leptopteris wilkesiana =

Species of fern

Leptopteris wilkesiana is a species of tree fern. It is native to Fiji, New Caledonia, New Guinea, the Samoan Islands, and Vanuatu.
