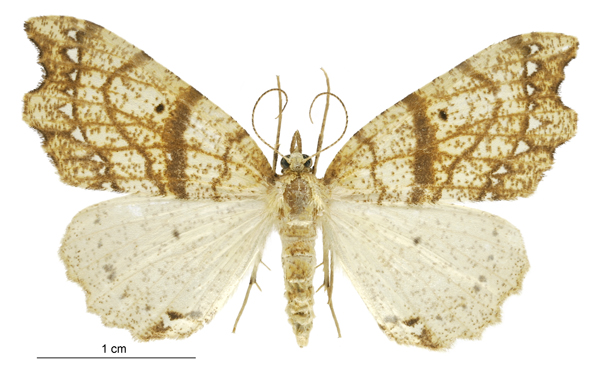
- Female Chalastra pellurgata

Scientific classification
- Kingdom: Animalia
- Phylum: Arthropoda
- Class: Insecta
- Order: Lepidoptera
- Family: Geometridae
- Subfamily: Ennominae
- Genus: Chalastra; Walker, 1862

Type species
- Chalastra pellurgata

= Chalastra (moth) =

Genus of moths

Chalastra is a genus of moths in the family Geometridae first described by Francis Walker in 1862. The type species of this genus is Chalastra pellurgata.

== Species ==
The species in this genus include:

- Chalastra aristarcha (Meyrick, 1892)
- Chalastra ochrea (Howes, 1911)
- Chalastra pellurgata (Walker, 1862)
