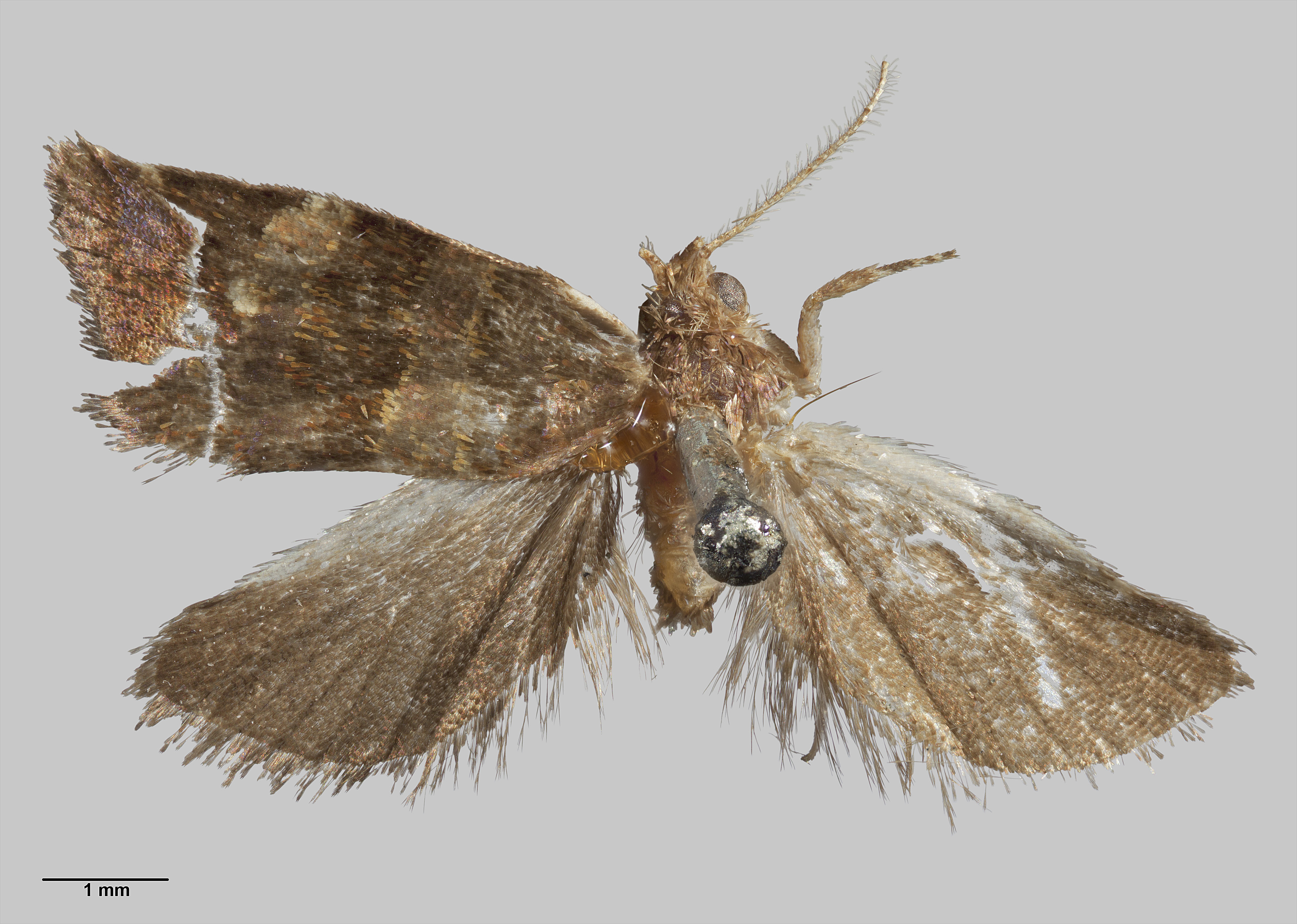
- Ecclitica philpotti

Scientific classification
- Domain: Eukaryota
- Kingdom: Animalia
- Phylum: Arthropoda
- Class: Insecta
- Order: Lepidoptera
- Family: Tortricidae
- Tribe: Archipini
- Genus: Ecclitica; Meyrick, 1923

Synonyms
- Curvisaccula Dugdale, 1966

= Ecclitica =

Genus of tortrix moths

Ecclitica is a genus of moths belonging to the subfamily Tortricinae of the family Tortricidae. It was first described in 1923 by Edward Meyrick.

== Species ==
- Ecclitica hemiclista (Meyrick, 1905)
- Ecclitica philpotti (Dugdale, 1978)
- Ecclitica torogramma (Meyrick, 1897)
- Ecclitica triorthota (Meyrick, 1927)

== See also ==
- List of Tortricidae genera
