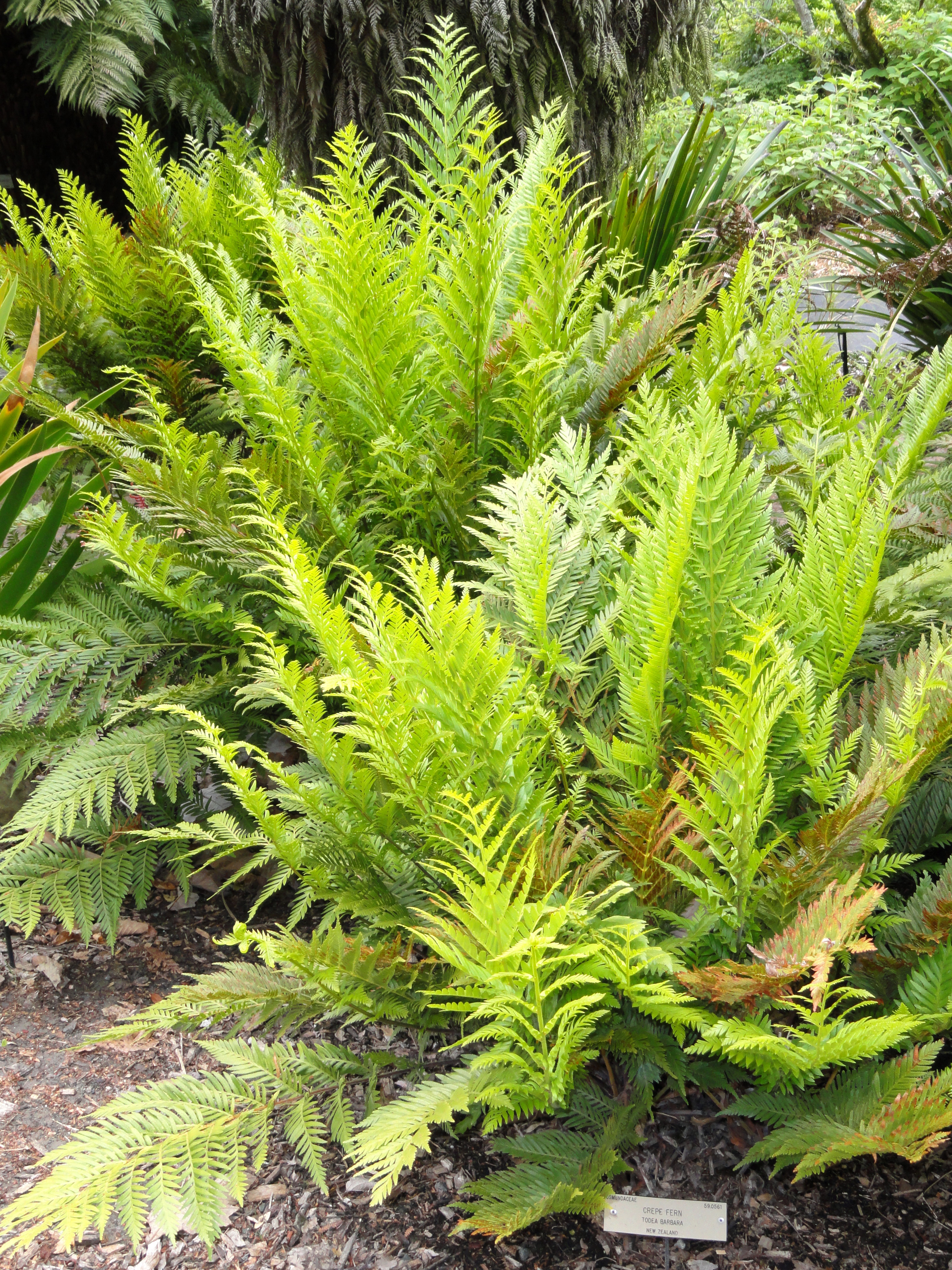

Scientific classification
- Kingdom: Plantae
- Clade: Tracheophytes
- Division: Polypodiophyta
- Class: Polypodiopsida
- Order: Osmundales
- Family: Osmundaceae
- Genus: Todea
- Species: T. barbara

Binomial name
- Todea barbara (L.) T.Moore
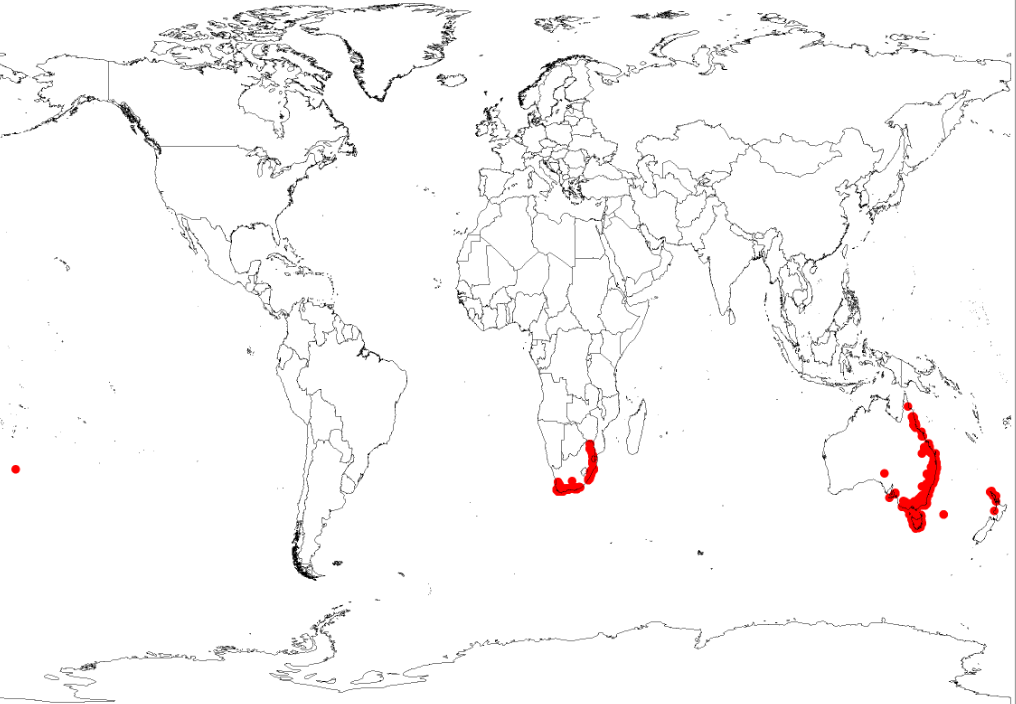
- Occurrence data from GBIF

Synonyms
- Todea rivularis Kunze

= Todea barbara =

King fern

Species of plant

Todea barbara, known as the king fern or crape fern, is a fern in the family Osmundaceae occurring in moist areas of south eastern Australia, and also indigenous to New Zealand, Australia and South Africa.

== Taxonomy ==
Carl Linnaeus described the king fern in volume II of his Species Plantarum as Acrostichum barbarum in 1753, from Africa. Thomas Moore gave it its current name in 1857.

== Description ==
The king fern grows up to 3 metres (10 ft) tall, but has a short stumpy base. The fronds are up to 2.5 metres (8.2 ft) long. The caudex by itself can be up to 3 m tall and equally thick.

== Distribution and habitat ==
The king fern grows alongside streams, in rainforest gullies and other wet spots in tall open forest. Occasionally it is found in drier sites in rock crevices among sandstone or granite cliffs or rockfaces.

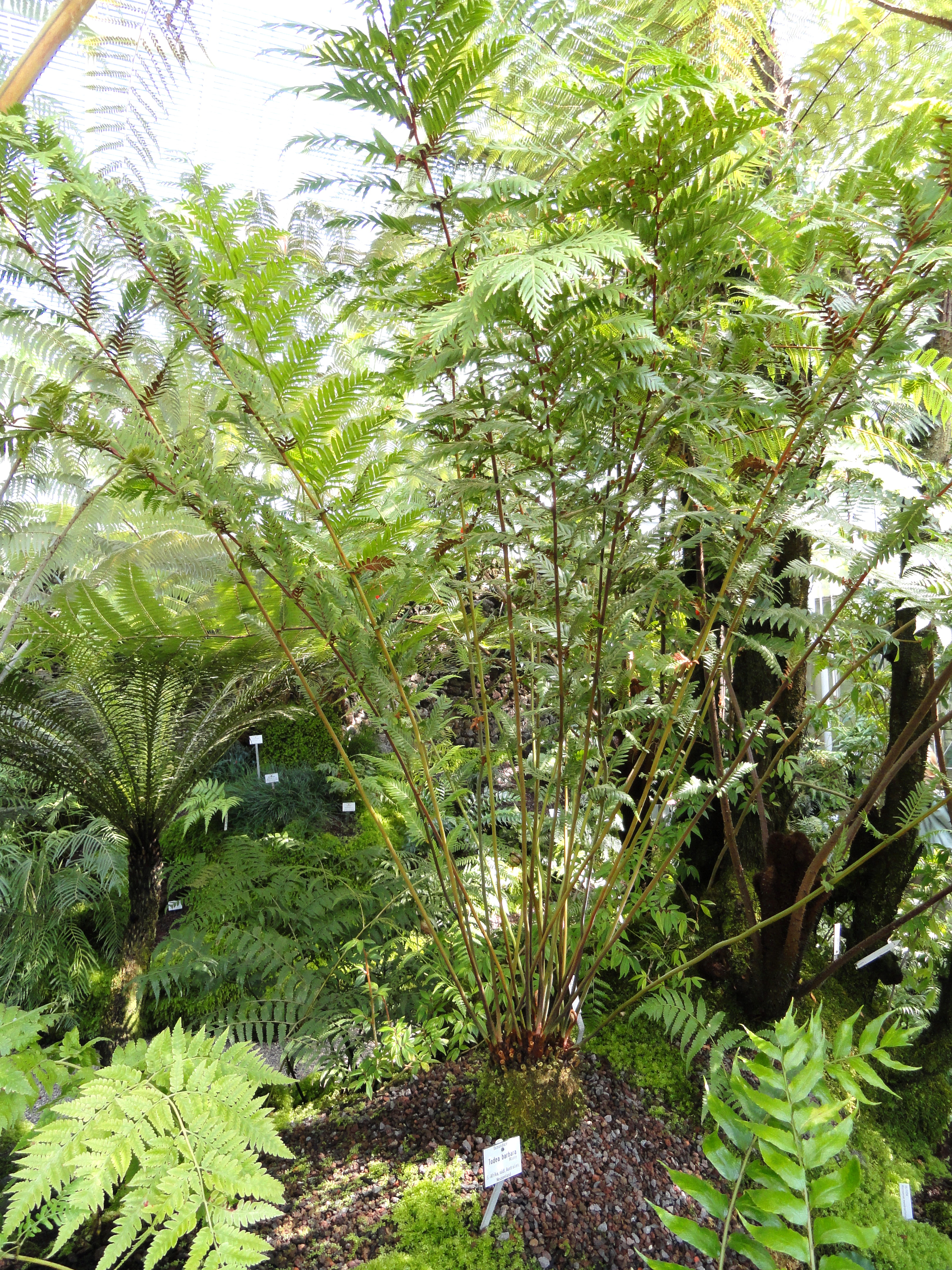
Todea barbara showing trunk

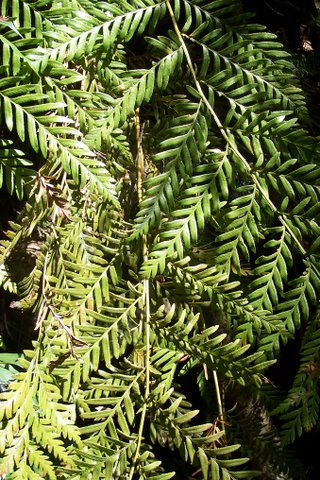
King Fern closeup of frond

In South Australia, Todea barbara is increasingly rare, with small groups occurring in just a few disparate localities in the Mount Lofty Ranges.

The largest remaining stand was in Uraidla on private property, on the upper reaches of "Deep Creek", a tributary to Sixth Creek in the Torrens Catchment. In the 1970s, many ancient two metre tall fern trunks were removed by a plant poacher at night, possibly under the mistaken belief that they were tree ferns, which can transplant readily. Mature king ferns do not. There are a few remnants in this gully today and some local native plant specialists have propagated plants from spores from this site, which may be grown in the home garden or planted along creek edges.

In New Zealand, the king fern is restricted to Northland, where it is found from North Cape to Whangarei and Kai Iwi Lakes, and Three Kings Islands.

== Cultivation ==
The Australian native plant industry has propagated many from spores. They can be readily acquired through nurseries as an ornamental plant for gardens and natural landscaping. Most of these will be of Victorian or NSW origin.

The king fern grows readily in gardens in temperate or subtropical climates. It prefers a spot in moist acidic soil in shade or dappled shade, though can grow in sunnier locations as long as it is watered often.
