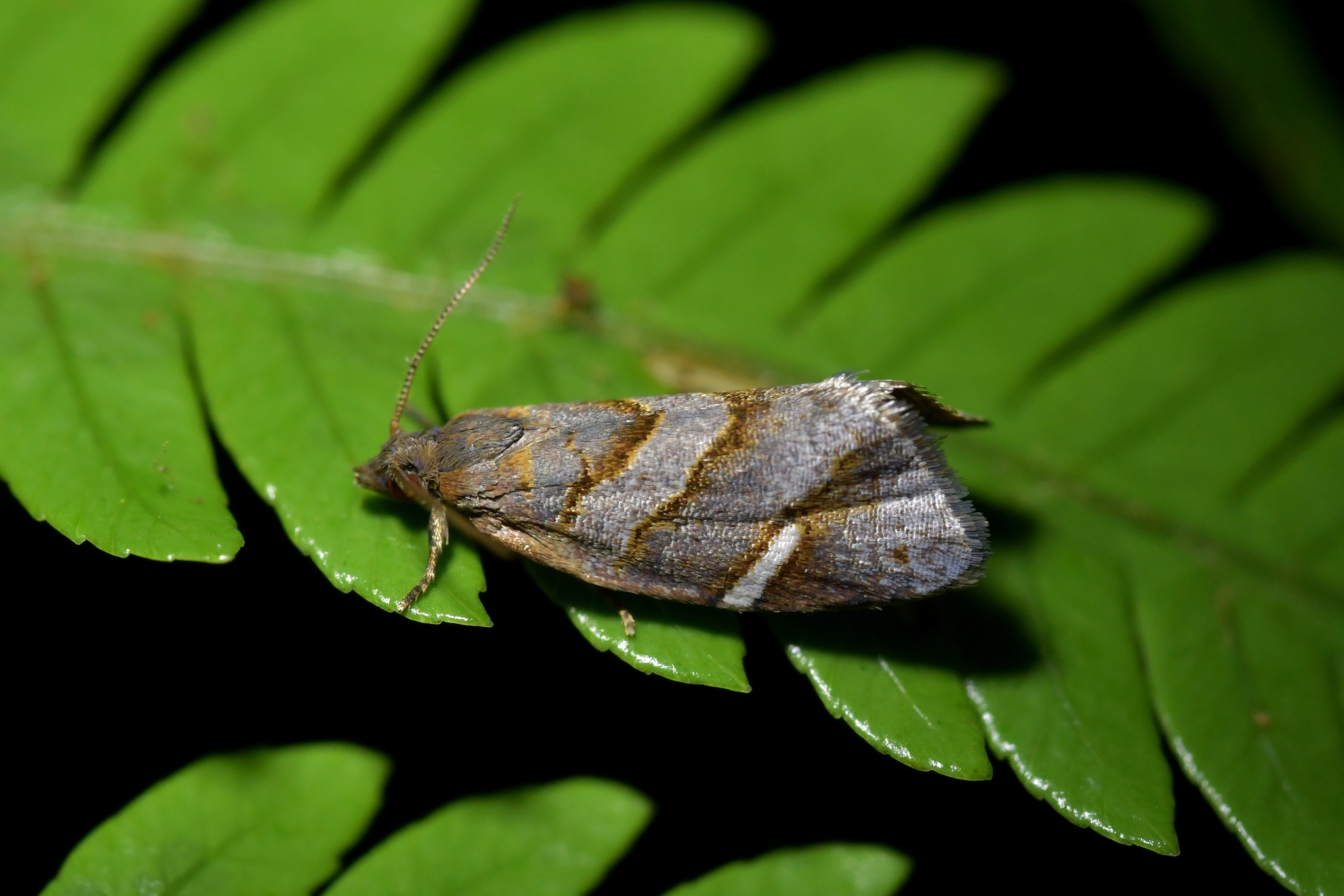

Scientific classification
- Kingdom: Animalia
- Phylum: Arthropoda
- Class: Insecta
- Order: Lepidoptera
- Family: Tortricidae
- Genus: Ecclitica
- Species: E. torogramma

Binomial name
- Ecclitica torogramma (Meyrick, 1897)

Synonyms
- Cacoecia torogramma Meyrick, 1897; Tortrix torogramma (Meyrick, 1987)

= Ecclitica torogramma =

Species of moth endemic to New Zealand

Ecclitica torogramma, also known as the ponga ugly nestmaker, is a species of moth of the family Tortricidae. It is endemic to New Zealand and can be found throughout the North Island and in the north of the South Island. This species inhabits native forest and the larval host is the silver fern. Larvae mature during New Zealand's spring and summer with adults being on the wing from September until February. Adults are nocturnal although they can be disturbed during the day. They are attracted to light and can also be located on the underside of silver fern fronds.

== Taxonomy ==
This species was first described by Edward Meyrick in 1897 using specimens collected by George Hudson in Wellington and named Cacoecia torogramma. When discussing this species in his 1928 publication The butterflies and moths of New Zealand Hudson discussed this species under the name Tortrix torogramma. Later in 1928 Alfred Philpott placed this species in the genus Ecclitica. The male lectotype specimen is held at the Natural History Museum, London.

== Description ==
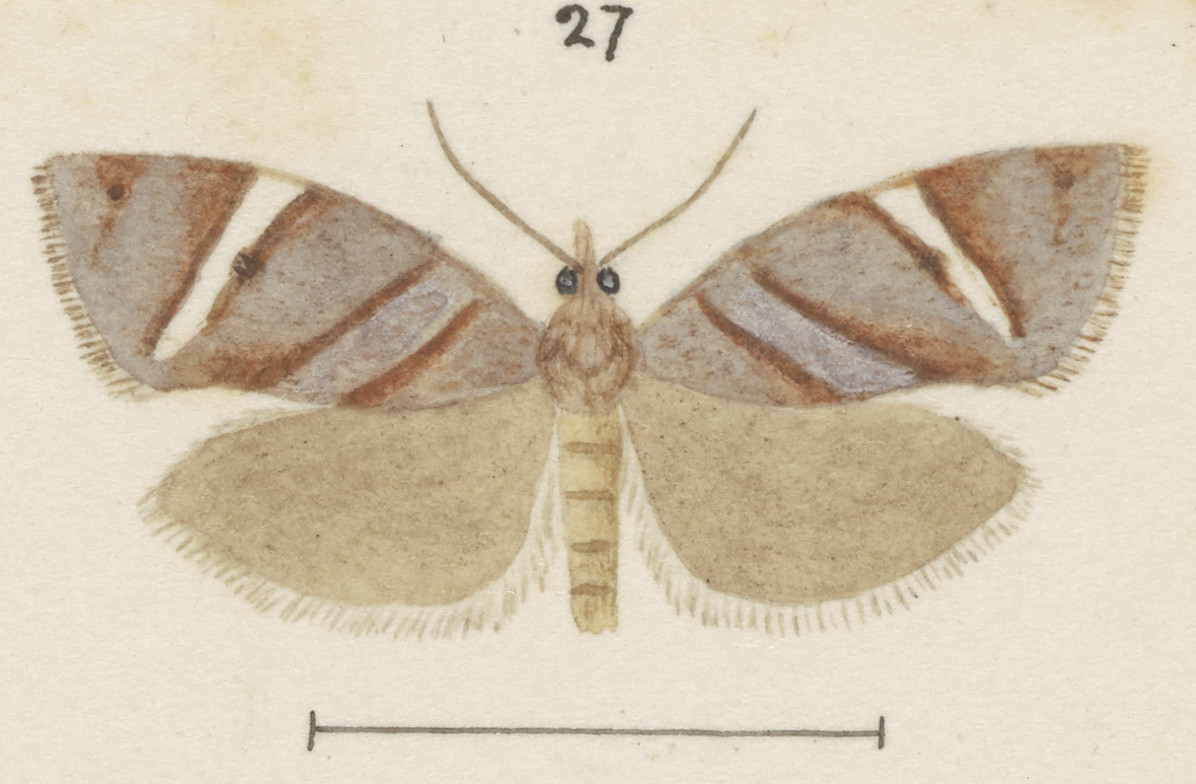
Illustration of male.

Larva of this species are small and green with a brown head and when mature is under 10 mm in length.

Meyrick described the adults of this species as follows:

♂♀ 19 mm. Head and thorax whitish-ochreous, slightly reddish-tinged. Palpi moderately long. Antennal ciliations in ♂ 1. Forewings suboblong, costa rather strongly arched, termen sinuate, rather oblique, costal fold in ♂ short, basal; whitish-ochreous, reddish-tinged, or mixed with pale reddish and whitish; outer edge of basal patch straight, very oblique, dark fuscous or red-brown; central fascia evenly broad, straight, very oblique, edged with dark fuscous or red-brown streaks, posterior not reaching tornus, in ♀ followed by a wedge-shaped whitish costal spot reaching half across wing, dark-edged posteriorly. Hindwings whitish-fuscous, rather darker in ♀.

The forewing pattern of E. torogramma is similar in appearance to the larger Chalastra aristarcha. Hudson points out the pattern and colouration of this moth is highly protective when the moth is resting on the underside of its host's fronds.

== Distribution ==
This species is endemic to New Zealand and is found throughout the North Island and in the northern parts of the South Island.

== Habitat and hosts ==
This species inhabits native forest. Its larval host plant is the silver fern.

== Behaviour ==
The larvae create a nest for themselves by weaving the growing tips of the fronds of its host plant together with silk webbing. They consume the fronds of their host plant during spring and summer. Adults of this species are on the wing from September to February. Adults are nocturnal although they can sometimes be seen flying during the day when disturbed. They are attracted to light. The adult moths can often be located during the day, hiding on the underside of fronds of their host plant.
