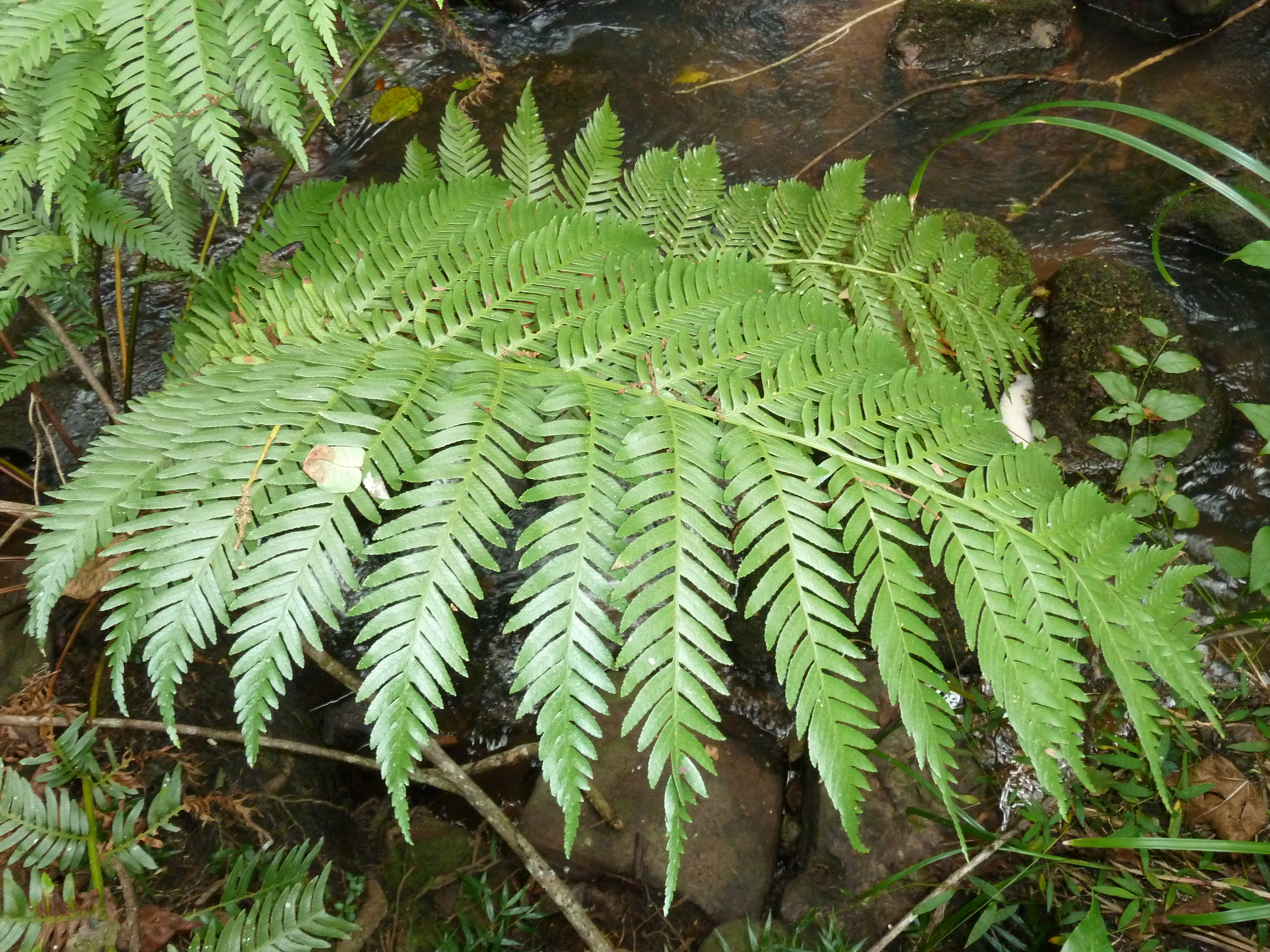
- Todea barbara

Scientific classification
- Kingdom: Plantae
- Clade: Tracheophytes
- Division: Polypodiophyta
- Class: Polypodiopsida
- Order: Osmundales
- Family: Osmundaceae
- Genus: Todea; Willdenow ex Bernhardi

Type species
- Todea africana Willdenow 1802

Species
- †T. amissa; T. barbara; T. papuana; †T. tidwellii; †T. minutacaulis

= Todea =

Todea Temporal range: Early Cretaceous–Recent

Genus of ferns

The fern genus Todea is known from only two living species. Species in the genus Todea, as Leptopteris, are distinct from other in Osmundaceae in that sporangia are born on laminar pinnules.

== Description ==
The species in the genus have a sub-erect stem and coarse, pinnate leaves. Many large sporangia are located on the bottoms of the leaves and are not arranged in sori or covered by an indusium.

== Species ==
Only two extant species are currently recognised. Todea barbara L., known as the king fern, is native to South Africa, New Zealand, and Australia while Todea papuana H. is known only from Papua New Guinea.

So far the fossil record of the genus Todea consists only of the permineralized rhizome Todea tidwellii from the Lower Cretaceous of Vancouver Island, Canada and the species Todea amissa, known from the Eocene of Patagonia, Argentina. Todea minutacaulis has also been described from the Lower Cretaceous of Vancouver Island and represents the first anatomically preserved fossil fern sporeling from the fossil record.

== Bibliography ==
- Nathan Jud, Gar W.Rothwell and Ruth A. Stockey. 2008. "Todea from the Lower Cretaceous of western North America: implications for the phylogeny, systematics, and evolution of modern Osmundaceae." American Journal of Botany, 95:330-339.
- E.Hennipman. 1968. A new Todea from New Guinea, with remarks on the generic delimitation of recent Osmundaceae. Blumea 16: 105-108
- C.Michael Hogan. 2010. Fern. Encyclopedia of Earth. eds. Saikat Basu and C.Cleveland. National Council for Science and the Environment. Washington DC.
- Walker, Z., Rothwell, G. W., & Stockey, R. A. 2023. Fossil evidence for sporeling development of a Mesozoic osmundaceous fern. American Journal of Botany, 110: e16210-n/a. https://doi.org/10.1002/ajb2.16210
