= Todea tidwellii =

Scientific classification
- Kingdom: Plantae
- Clade: Tracheophytes
- Division: Polypodiophyta
- Class: Polypodiopsida
- Order: Osmundales
- Family: Osmundaceae
- Genus: Todea
- Species: †T. tidwellii

Binomial name
- †Todea tidwellii Jud et al., 2008

Extinct species of fern

Todea tidwellii is an extinct species of fern in the genus Todea. Fossils have been recovered from the Late Cretaceous of British Columbia.
