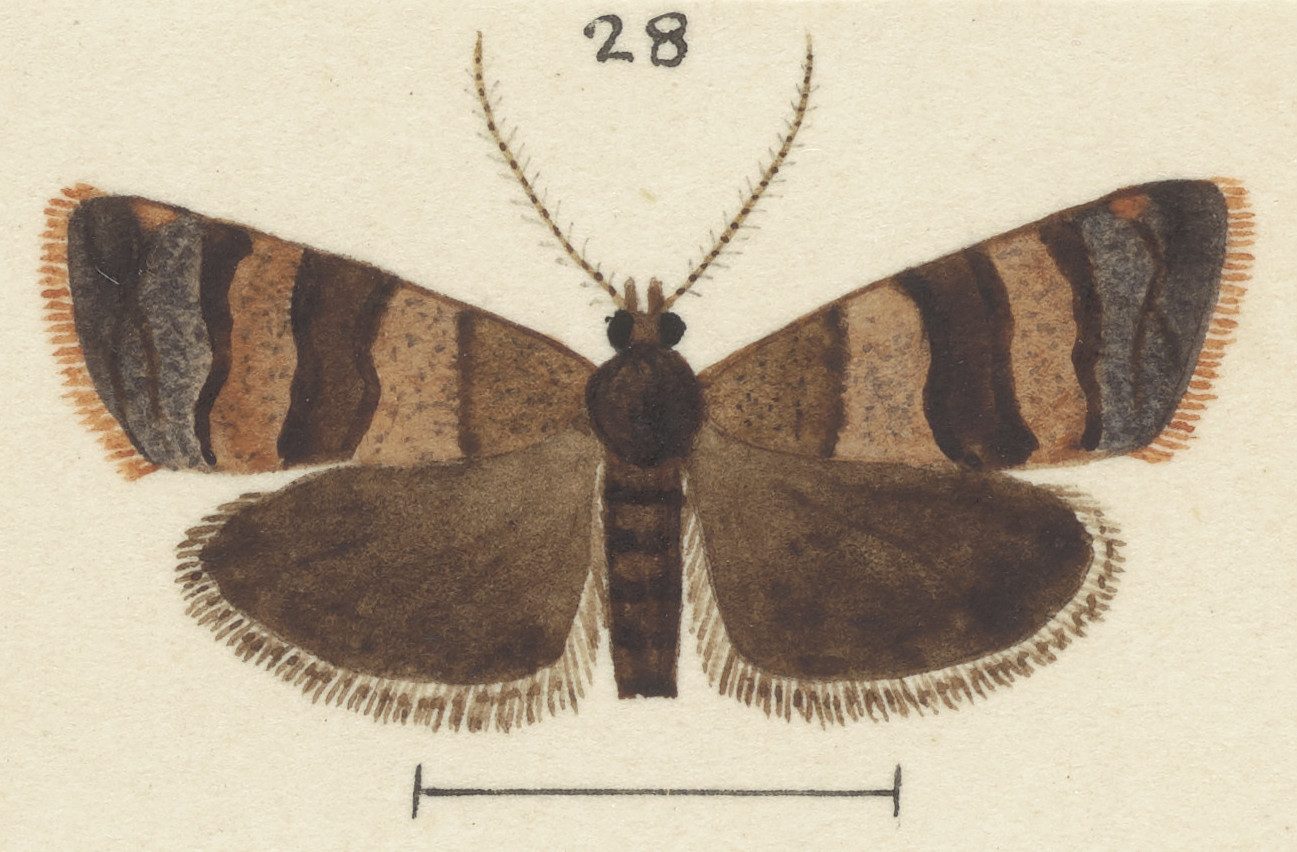

Scientific classification
- Domain: Eukaryota
- Kingdom: Animalia
- Phylum: Arthropoda
- Class: Insecta
- Order: Lepidoptera
- Family: Tortricidae
- Genus: Ecclitica
- Species: E. triorthota

Binomial name
- Ecclitica triorthota (Meyrick, 1927)

Synonyms
- Epichorista triorthota Meyrick, 1927; Curvisaccula triorthota (Meyrick, 1927); Curvisacculus triorthota (Meyrick, 1927)

= Ecclitica triorthota =

Species of moth endemic to New Zealand

Ecclitica triorthota, also known as the kātote ugly nestmaker, is a species of moth of the family Tortricidae. It was first described by Edward Meyrick and is endemic to New Zealand. This species has been observed in the North Island in the Wellington (including at Ōtari Wilton's Bush), Taranaki and Auckland regions. It inhabits native forest and the larval plant host is Cyathea smithii.

== Taxonomy ==
This species was first described by Edward Meyrick in 1927 using a specimen collected at Sinclair Stream in Wainuiomata in December and originally named Epichorista triorthota. In 1928 George Hudson discussed and illustrated this species under that name in his book The butterflies and moths of New Zealand. In 1966 John S. Dugdale placed this species in the genus Curvisaccula. In 2010 the New Zealand Inventory of Biodiversity discussed this species under the name Ecclitica triorthota. The male holotype specimen is held at the Natural History Museum, London.

== Description ==
The mature larva is green coloured with a brown head and is at most 10 mm in length.

Meyrick described the adult of this species as follows:

♂ 14 mm. Head, palpi, thorax dark bronzy-brown. Antennal ciliations three, whorled. Forewings somewhat dilated, with slender costal fold on basal fifth, termen rather oblique; ochreous, tinged or suffused purplish-grey except towards costa; markings dark ferruginous-brown suffused dark fuscous on edges; basal patch moderate, edge straight, almost direct; central fascia moderate, somewhat narrower on dorsum, hardly oblique; an almost direct fascia from costa at 2/3, moderately broad on costa but finely attenuated on dorsal half, anterior margin somewhat excavated above middle and edged with a whitish mark; posterior area beyond this wholly dark purplish-grey except a small ochreous costal spot beyond fascia, and an irregular ferruginous-ochreous subterminal streak: cilia ochreous, basal third and an apical spot dark grey. Hindwings dark grey; cilia light grey, basal third grey.

== Distribution ==
This species is endemic to New Zealand. Although previous thought to be restricted to the Wellington region, this species has also been observed in the Taranaki and Auckland regions. Hudson stated that along with the type locality of Wainuiomata, this species had also been observed at Ōtari Wilton's Bush.

== Habitat and hosts ==
This species inhabits native forest. The larval host of this species is Cyathea smithii.

== Behaviour ==
The larva of this species creates a shelter by tying the tips of fronds of its host species together with silk. The larva ensures its shelter remains clean by flicking its waste from it. The adult moth has been observed on the wing in September and December.
