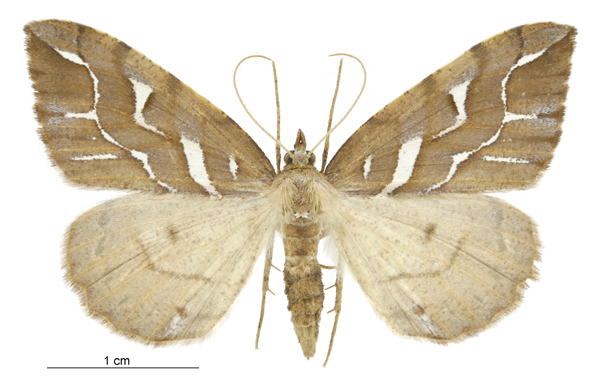
- Female
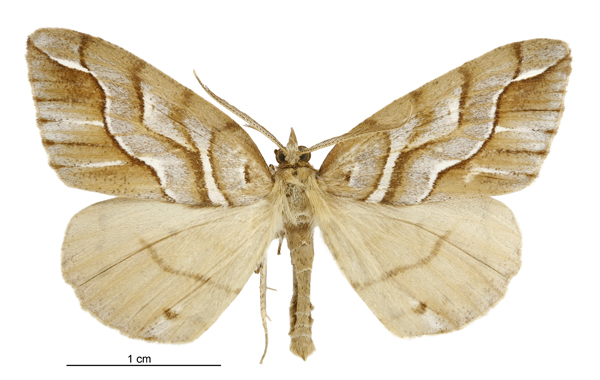
- Male

Scientific classification
- Kingdom: Animalia
- Phylum: Arthropoda
- Class: Insecta
- Order: Lepidoptera
- Family: Geometridae
- Genus: Chalastra
- Species: C. aristarcha

Binomial name
- Chalastra aristarcha (Meyrick, 1892)

Synonyms
- Selidosema aristarcha Meyrick, 1892; Pseudocoremia aristarcha (Meyrick, 1892)

= Chalastra aristarcha =

Species of moth, endemic to New Zealand

Chalastra aristarcha, the silver fern moth, is a moth of the family Geometridae. This species was first described by Edward Meyrick in 1892. It is endemic to New Zealand and is found in the North Island. This species inhabits dense native forest. The larvae feed on the species host plant, the Silver fern, during spring. This species then pupates on top of leaf litter or moss on the ground. The pupation state lasts for approximately 6 weeks. Adult moths are on the wing from October until April but can sometimes also be seen during the winter months. Adults can be disturbed from silver ferns during the day or are seen on the wing at night particularly at Metrosideros perforata when in flower. Adults are attracted to light. It has been hypothesised that the range of C. aristarcha has restricted as a result of urban development and land conversion of its habitat.

== Taxonomy ==
This species was first described by Edward Meyrick in 1892 using a specimen collected by George Hudson in Wellington and named Selidosema aristarcha. Hudson discussed and illustrated this species using that name both in his 1898 book New Zealand moths and butterflies (Macro-lepidoptera) and his 1928 book The butterflies and moths of New Zealand. In 1988 John S. Dugdale placed this species in the genus Chalastra. He placed this species in that genus as it was included by Meyrick in Selidosema, and had a reduced, rounded uncus and no spinose process on the disc of the valva. This placement was accepted in the New Zealand Inventory of Biodiversity. The male holotype is held at the Natural History Museum, London.

== Description ==
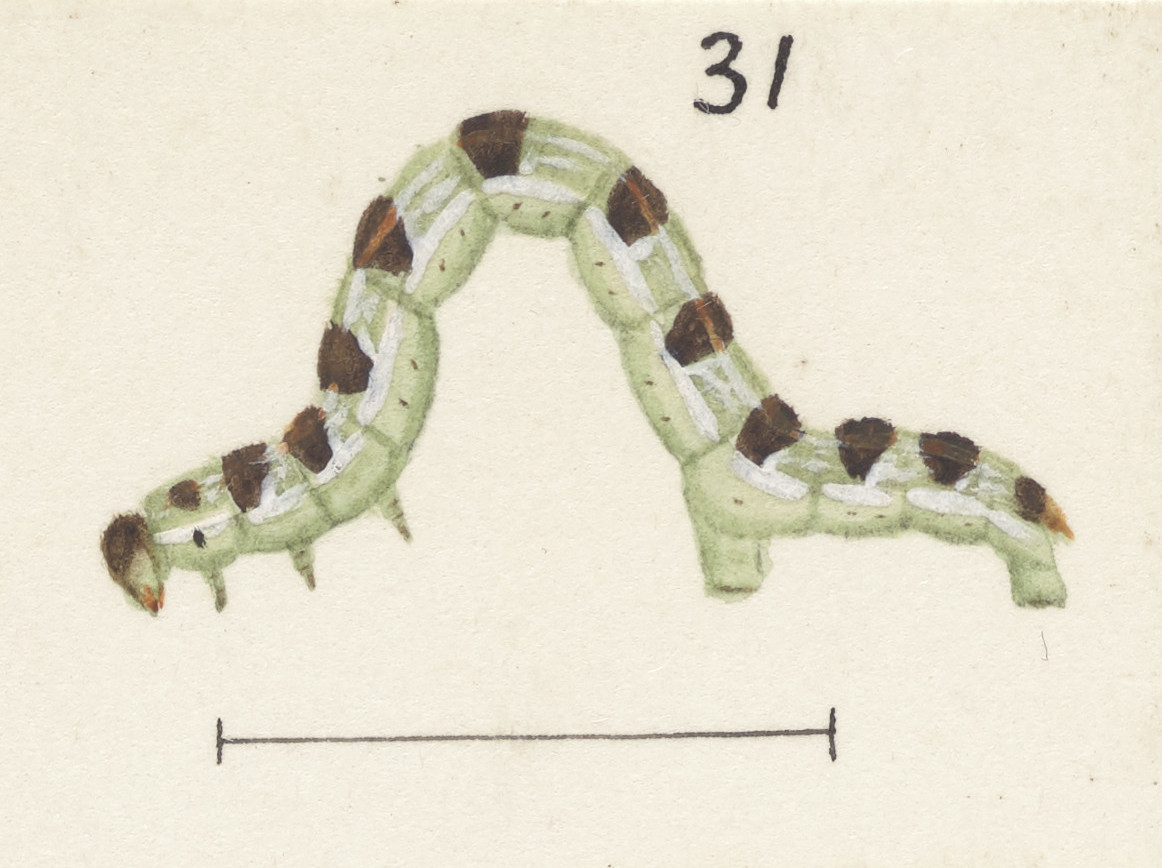
Illustration of larva by Hudson.

Hudson described the larva of this species as follows:

Prior to its last moult, it is pale green, with white sub-dorsal and lateral lines and conspicuous brown blotches on the sides of each segment, often meeting across the back. The full-grown larva is about 1-inch in length, stout, slightly attenuated towards the head; dull green mottled with white with the edges of the segments yellowish-brown; there are two conspicuous white sub-dorsal lines and two broad irregular white lateral lines, narrower at the segmental divisions; the spiracles are brown.

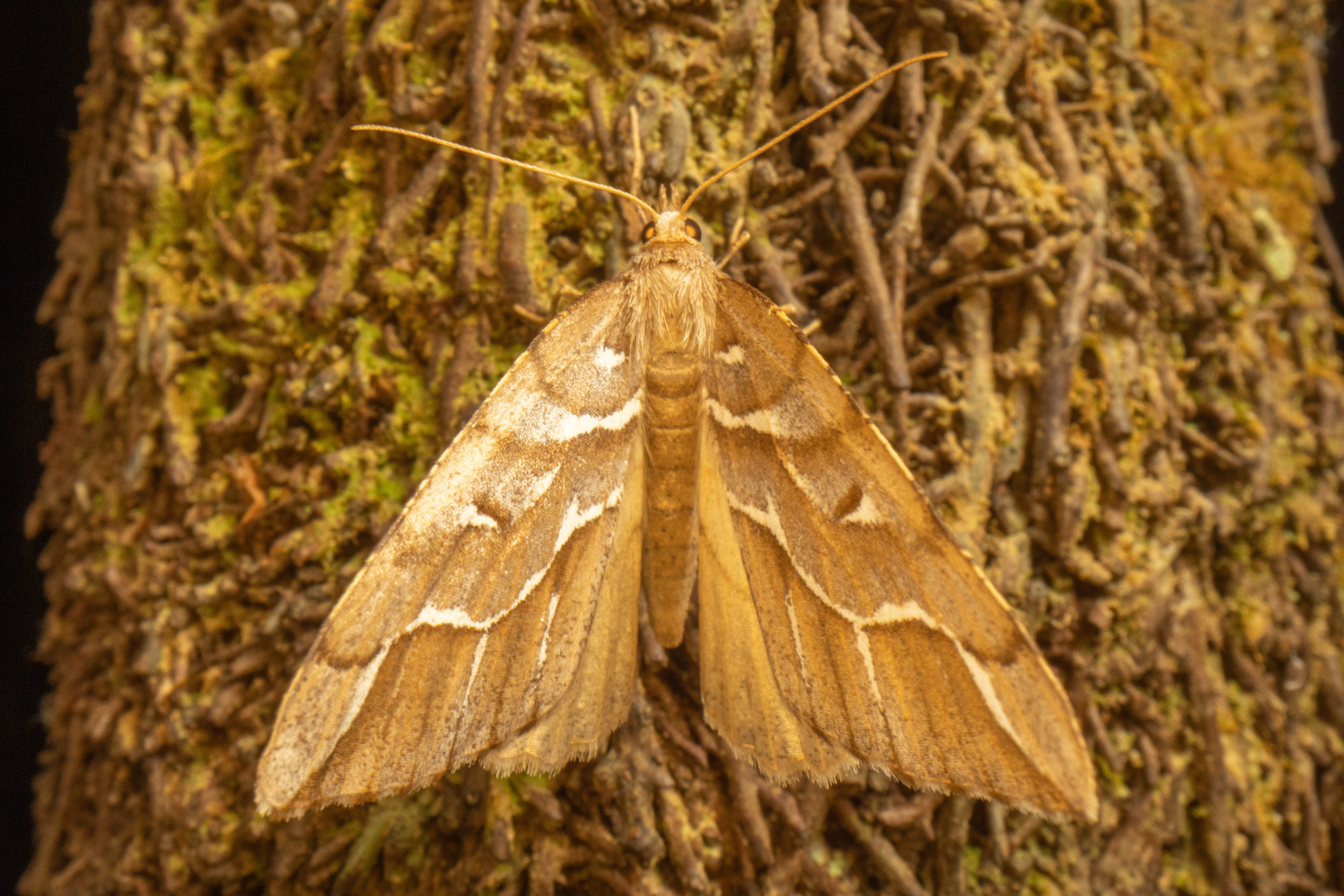
Observation of C. aristarcha.

Meyrick described the adult male of this species as follows:

♂. 37mm. Head, palpi, thorax, abdomen, and legs pale ochreous, back of crown and anterior part of thorax darker; face whitish-tinged; palpi 2 1/4; abdomen and legs thinly sprinkled with dark fuscous. Antenntae whitish-ochreous, pectinations 12, apical 1/6 simple. Forewings rather elongate-triangular, hindmargin almost straight; 10 connected with 9, 11 free; light yellowish-ochreous, irrorated between the veins with pale fuscous and in disc with white, veins deeper yellow-ochreous; a white transverse mark near base below middle, edged anteriorly with ochreous-fuscous; lines slender, rather cloudy, dark ochreous-fuscous; first rather strongly curved; median very slightly curved, space between this and first line suffused with white on lower 2/3; second very obtusely angulated above middle, on lower half wholly confluent with median to form a narrow shade; a white suffusion before second line towards angle, in which is a transverse linear dark fuscous discal mark; subterminal remote from hindmargin, running from 4/5 of costa to middle of inner margin, slender, dark fuscous, edged with clear white anteriorly except towards costa, twice sinuate; a clear white longitudinal dash from subterminal line at 1/4 below costa to near hindmargin, beneath which is a broad ochreous-fuscous suffusion; spaces between veins below this suffusedly streaked with fuscous. Hindwings with hindmargin rounded, waved; pale ochreous; a slender curved fuscous line beyond middle, obsolete towards costa; a small fuscous spot towards anal angle.

Hudson pointed out that the species varies slightly in size and that the female is a little darker than the male. The females of the species can be larger than the males. Hudson pointed out that the colouration of the adult moth provides protective camouflage for the moth as it resembles the dead leaves of its host plant, the silver fern. This silvery banded colouration can also be found in an unrelated moth species whose larval host is also the silver fern, Ecclitica torogramma.

== Distribution ==
C. aristarcha is endemic to New Zealand. It is found throughout the North Island. D. E. Gaskin pointed out in 1966 that although Hudson regarded it as common in Wellington he had yet to collect it there. He was of the opinion that the range of this species had contracted as cultivation of land increased.

== Habitat ==
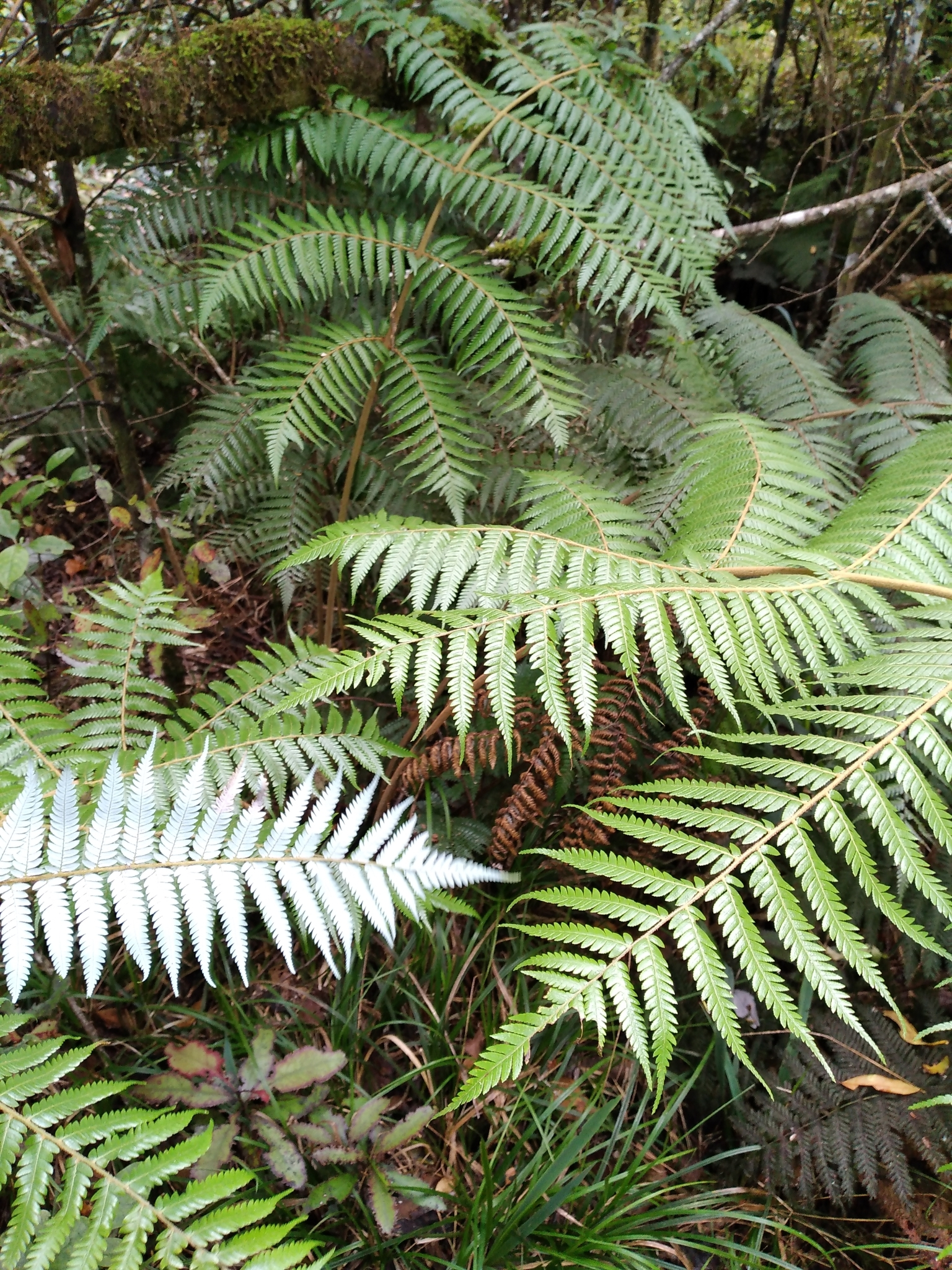
Silver fern, larval host of C. aristarcha.

This species inhabits dense native forest.

== Behaviour and life cycle ==
The larva feed during spring, are very sluggish and can observed on the silvery underside of its host plant. C. aristarcha pupates on the ground under its host plant and amongst leaf detritus and moss. It stays in that state for approximately 6 weeks. Adult moths are on the wing from October until April but can sometimes also be seen during the winter months. Gaskin believed there were two broods but was unsure at which life stage C. aristarcha passed winter as both adults and larvae are present in spring. Adults of this species have been collected by beating its host plant and have been observed in the evening at Metrosideros perforata when in flower. They are attracted to light.

== Host species ==
The larval host species of this moth is the silver fern.
