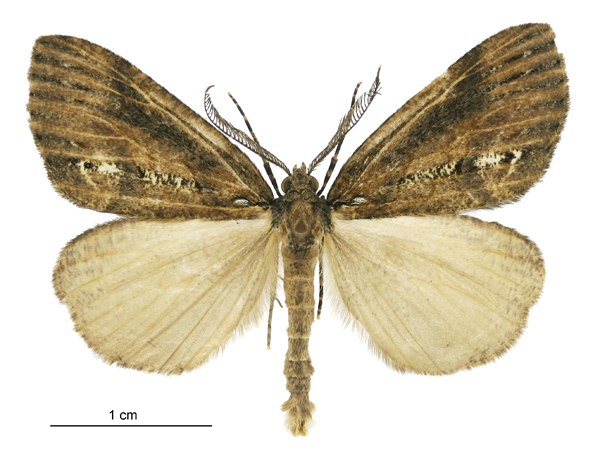
- Male
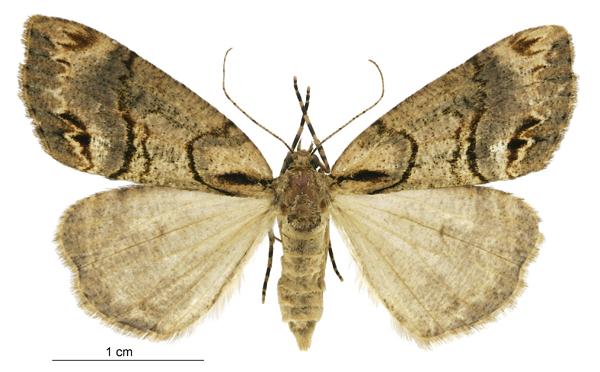
- Female

Scientific classification
- Kingdom: Animalia
- Phylum: Arthropoda
- Class: Insecta
- Order: Lepidoptera
- Family: Geometridae
- Genus: Chalastra
- Species: C. ochrea

Binomial name
- Chalastra ochrea (Howes, 1911)

Synonyms
- Selidosema ochrea Howes, 1911; Selidosema prototoxa Meyrick, 1919; Chalastra prototoxa (Meyrick, 1919); Pseudocoremia ochrea (Howes, 1911); Pseudocoremia prototoxa (Meyrick, 1919)

= Chalastra ochrea =

Species of moth, endemic to New Zealand

Chalastra ochrea is a moth of the family Geometridae. It is endemic to New Zealand. It has been observed in both the North and South Islands and inhabits native forest. Larvae of C. ochrea feed on the leaves of species in the genus Sophora including Sophora chathamica. Adults are on the wing from February until April. They have been collected via sugar traps.

== Taxonomy ==
It was first described by George Howes in 1911 from specimens collected at Woodhaugh Gardens in Dunedin in February and April and named Selidosema ochrea. In 1919 Edward Meyrick, thinking he was describing a new species, named this species Selidosema prototoxa. George Hudson described and illustrated S. ochrea in his 1928 book The butterflies and moths of New Zealand. In 1939 Hudson discussed and illustrated the larvae of this species under the name Selidosema prototoxa. In 1988 John S. Dugdale placed this species in the genus Chalastra. He placed this species in that genus as it was included by Meyrick in Selidosema, and had "a reduced, rounded uncus and no spinose process on the disc of the valva". In the same publication Dugdale synonymised Selidosema prototoxa with C. ochrea as he argued that the genitalia were indistinguishable between specimens of S. prototoxa and C. ochrea. He also argued that the specimens in the New Zealand Arthropod Collection showed intergradation of the two colour forms. This placement and synonymising was accepted in the New Zealand Inventory of Biodiversity. The male holotype specimen is held at the Natural History Museum, London.

== Description ==
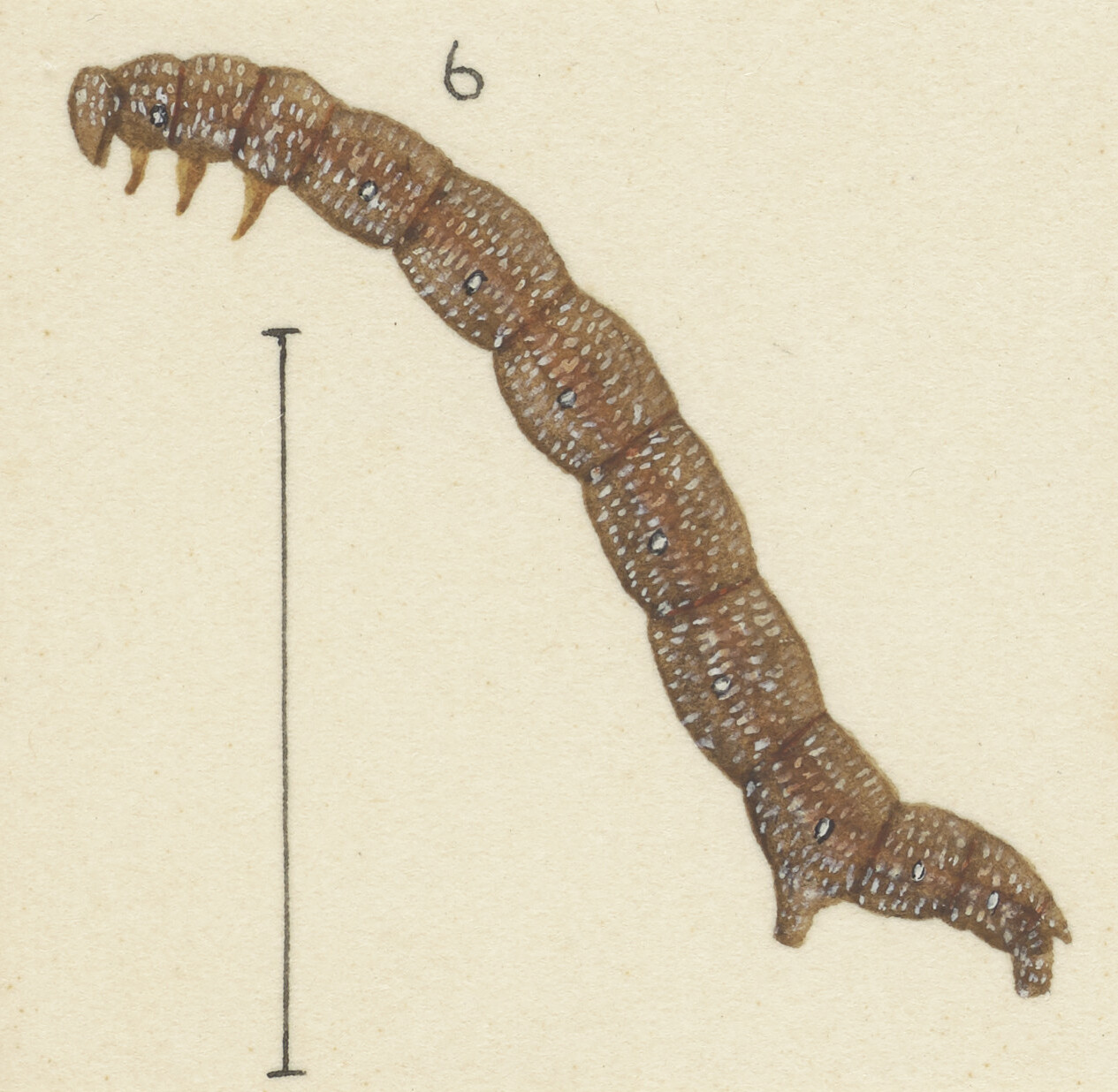
Illustration of larva.

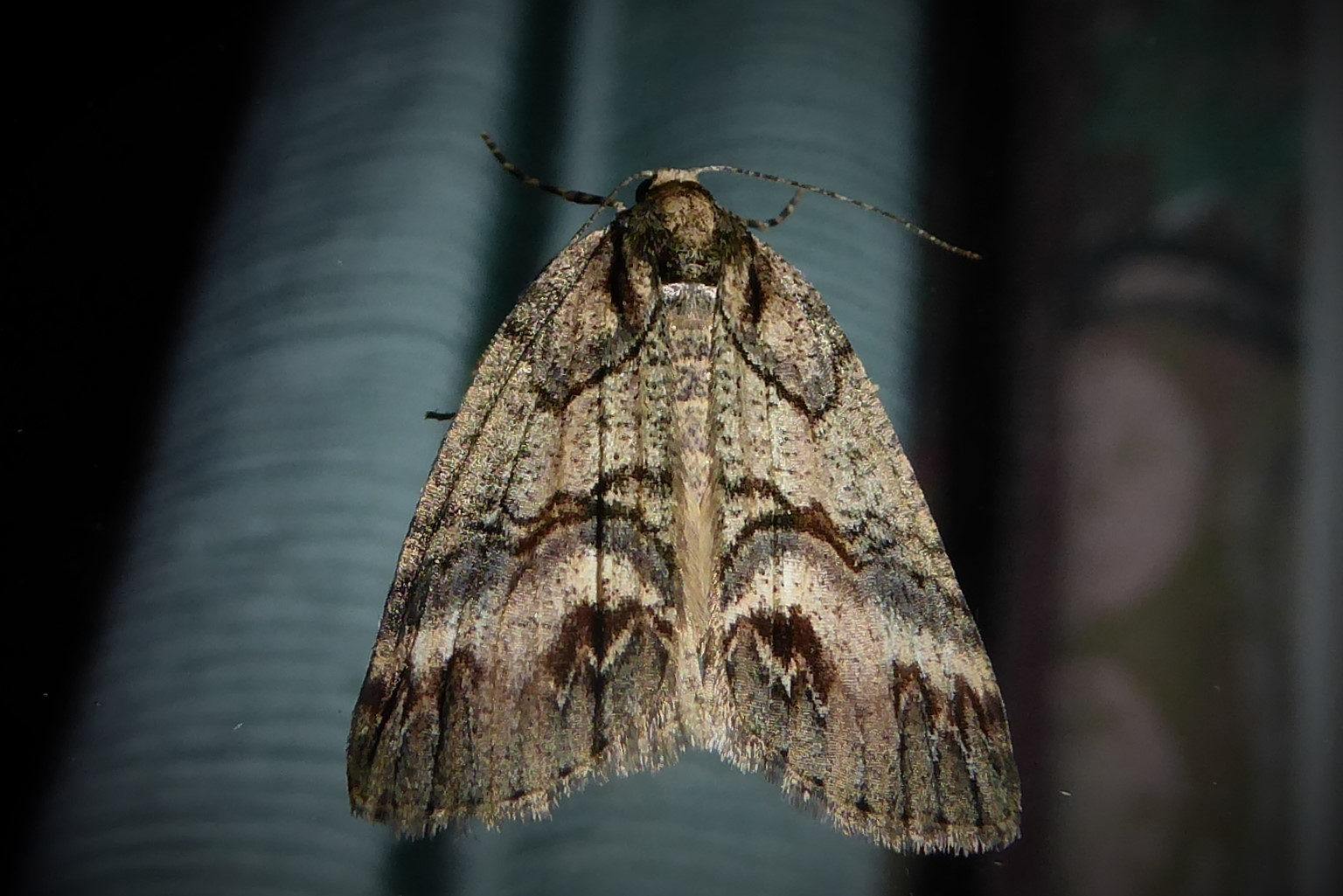
Living specimen.

The larvae of this species is brown coloured with distinctive markings.

Hudson described the larvae of this species (under the name Selidosema prototoxa) as follows:

The length of the full-grown larva is about 1 inch. Cylindrical, of fairly even thickness, with segments well defined. General colour deep greyish-ochreous, slightly suffused with reddishbrown on lateral ridge, which is prominent, but somewhat irregular. The whole larva is covered with very numerous, slender, broken, greyish-white marks which give it a very fine dappled appearance; these marks are denser and whiter on and below the lateral ridge. Spiracles white edged with black. Legs ochreous-brown, dappled with greyish-white near base.

Hudson described the adults of this species as follows:

The expansion of the wings is about 1 1/4 inches. The fore-wings are dull brownish-grey mixed with blackish-grey; there is a small irregular, ochreous basal patch, followed by a slender blackish transverse line, acutely angulated above the middle; the outer edge of the median band has a very prominent rounded projection slightly above the middle, and the subterminal line has seven sharp dentations; the space between the median band and the subterminal line is bright ochreous. The hind-wings are bright ochreous.

== Distribution ==
This species is endemic to New Zealand. Along with the type locality in Dunedin this species has also been observed in the Canterbury region as well as around the Wairarapa region and in the Central Hawke's Bay District.

== Habitat ==
This species inhabits native forest.

== Behaviour ==
The adults of this species have been collected via sugar traps. They are on the wing from February until April.

== Host plants ==
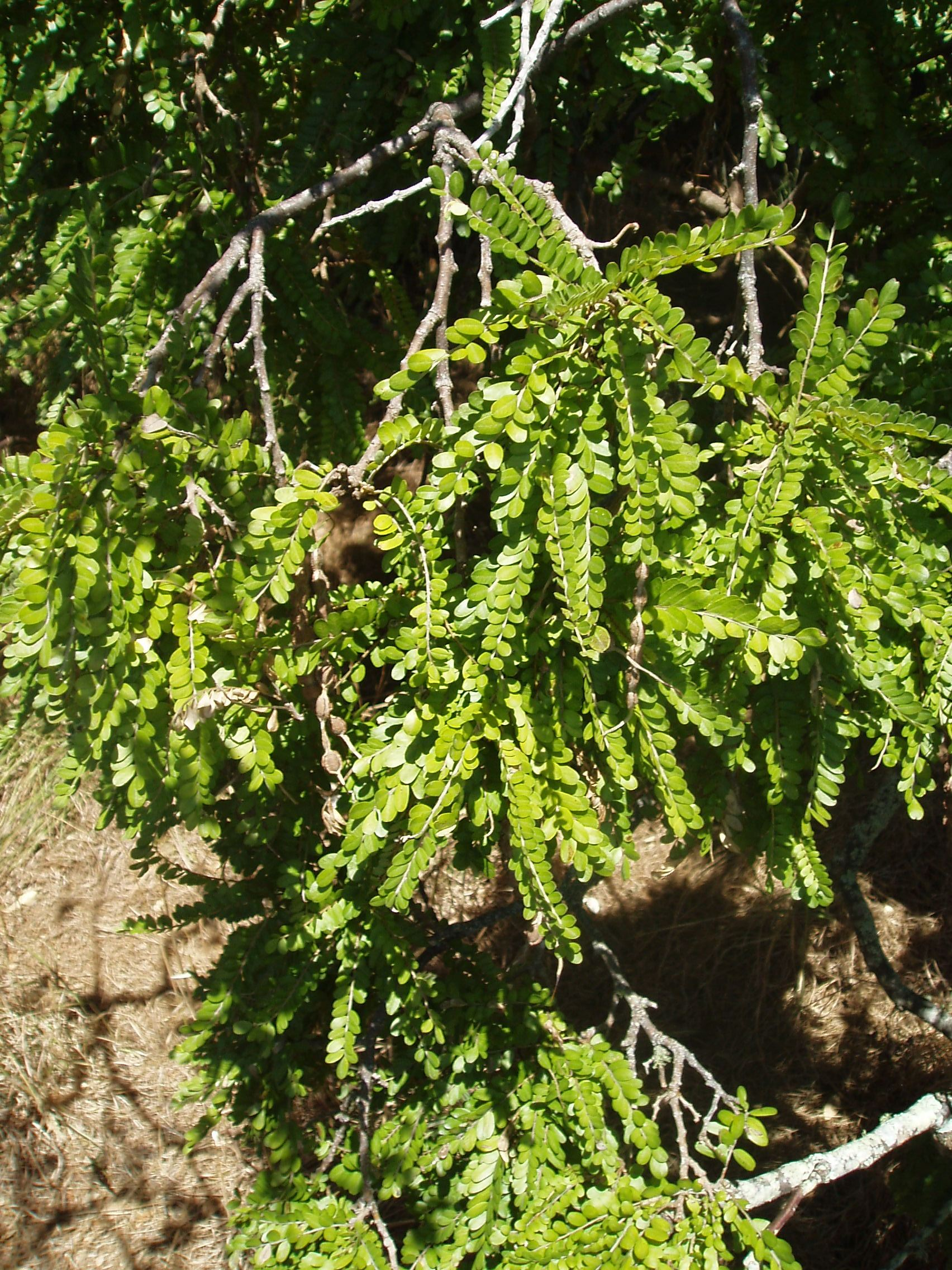
Larval host species, S. chathamica.

Larvae of C. ochrea feed on the leaves of species in the genus Sophora including Sophora chathamica.
