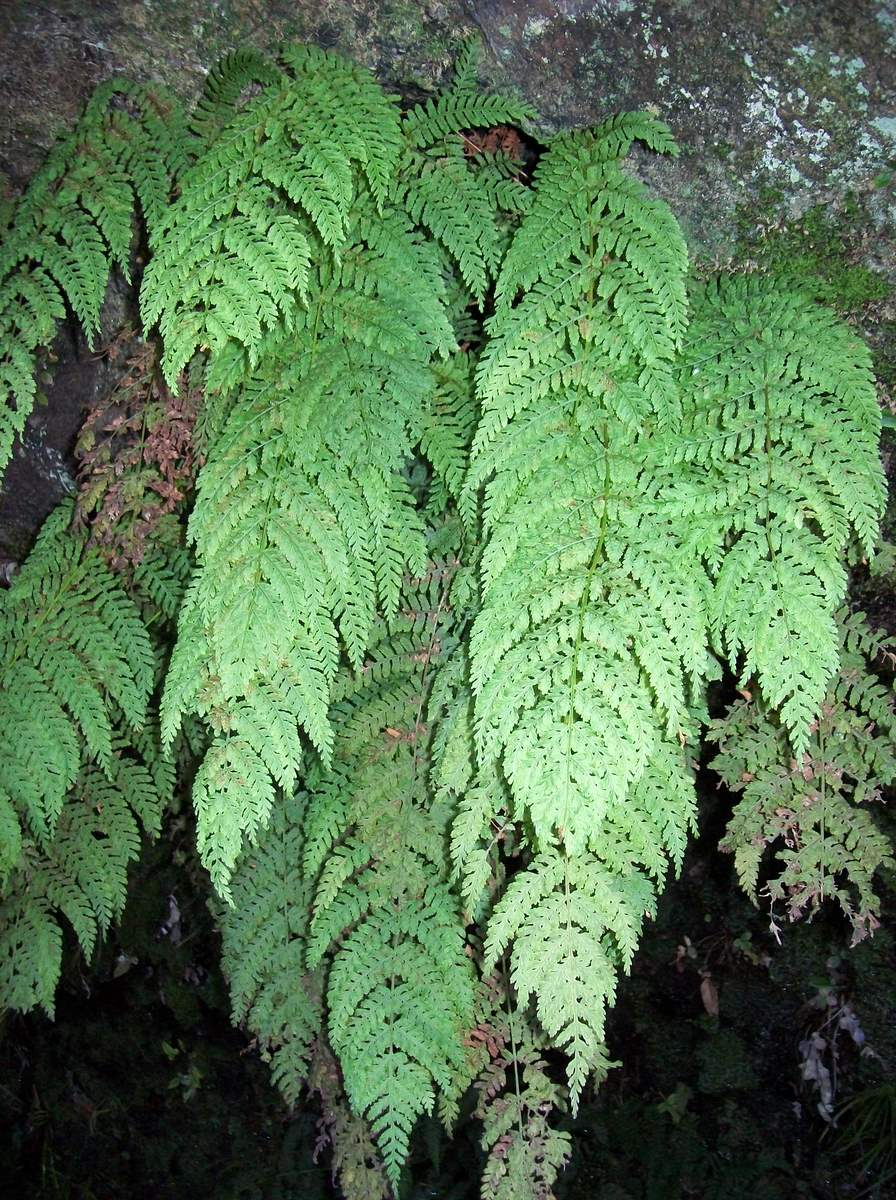
- cave fern at Blue Mountains National Park, Australia

Scientific classification
- Kingdom: Plantae
- Clade: Tracheophytes
- Division: Polypodiophyta
- Class: Polypodiopsida
- Order: Osmundales
- Family: Osmundaceae
- Genus: Leptopteris
- Species: L. fraseri

Binomial name
- Leptopteris fraseri (Hook. & Grev.) C.Presl

Synonyms
- Todea fraseri Hook. & Grev.

= Leptopteris fraseri =

Crepe fern

Species of fern

Leptopteris fraseri, commonly known as the crepe fern, is a species of plant occurring in eastern Australia. Its habitat is wet places, mostly on the Great Dividing Range. It is found in caves, near waterfalls, in dark shady places in the cooler rainforests.

== Description ==
A fern with a trunk to one metre high, with one or more crowns. The arching fronds may be one metre long, on a stipe between 20 and 45 cm (18 in). The stem may be glaucous. Small reddish-brown hairs may also be seen. Fronds are relatively thin, between 15 cm (6 in) and 25 cm (10 in) wide. Mature sporangia are found under the fronds in irregular patterns, brownish-orange in colour.
