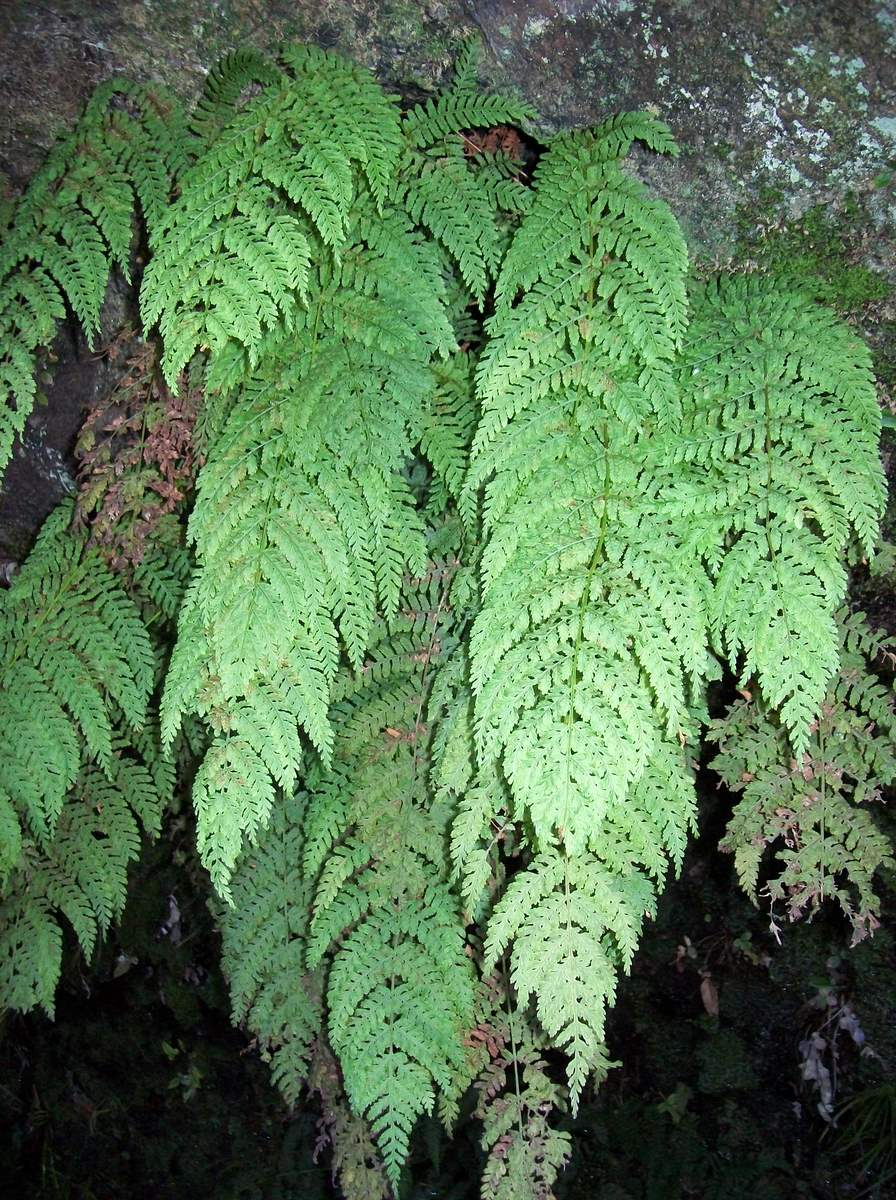
- L. fraseri, New South Wales

Scientific classification
- Kingdom: Plantae
- Clade: Tracheophytes
- Division: Polypodiophyta
- Class: Polypodiopsida
- Order: Osmundales
- Family: Osmundaceae
- Genus: Leptopteris; C.Presl

Type species
- Leptopteris fraseri (Hook. & Grev.) C.Presl

= Leptopteris =

Leptopteris Temporal range: Early Cretaceous–Recent

Genus of ferns

The Leptopteris is a small genus of ferns native to the New Guinea, Australia, New Zealand, and the Pacific Islands. They are similar to ferns in the related genus Todea, and were originally included in that genus. However, the very thin fronds of Leptopteris differ from the thick leathery fronds of Todea, and the genera are considered distinct. A probable extinct species, Leptopteris estipularis is known from the Early Cretaceous of India.

== Species ==
There are seven living species and one naturally occurring interspecific hybrid.

- Leptopteris alpina (Baker) C.Chr. – New Guinea and Seram
- †Leptopteris estipularis (Sharma, Bohra & Singh) Bomfleur, Grimm & McLoughlin
- Leptopteris fraseri (Hook. & Grev.) C.Presl – eastern New South Wales and northeastern Queensland
- Leptopteris hymenophylloides (A.Rich.) C.Presl – New Zealand and the Chatham Islands
- Leptopteris × intermedia (B.S.Williams ex T.Moore) Gower (L. hymenophylloides × L. superba) – New Zealand
- Leptopteris laxa Copeland – Bismarck Archipelago and Solomon Islands
- †Leptopteris minuta Romanovskaja
- Leptopteris moorei (Baker) Christ – Lord Howe Island
- Leptopteris superba (Colenso) C.Presl – New Zealand
- Leptopteris wilkesiana (Brack.) Gower – Fiji, New Caledonia, New Guinea, Samoan Islands, and Vanuatu

=== Phylogeny ===
Phylogeny of Leptopteris

- - L. fraseri (Hooker & Grev.) Presl (Crepe fern, Australia)
  - - L. superba (Colenso) Presl (Prince of Wales feather)
    - - L. hymenophylloides (Richard) Presl (Single crepe fern)
      - L. wilkesiana (Brack.) Christ
