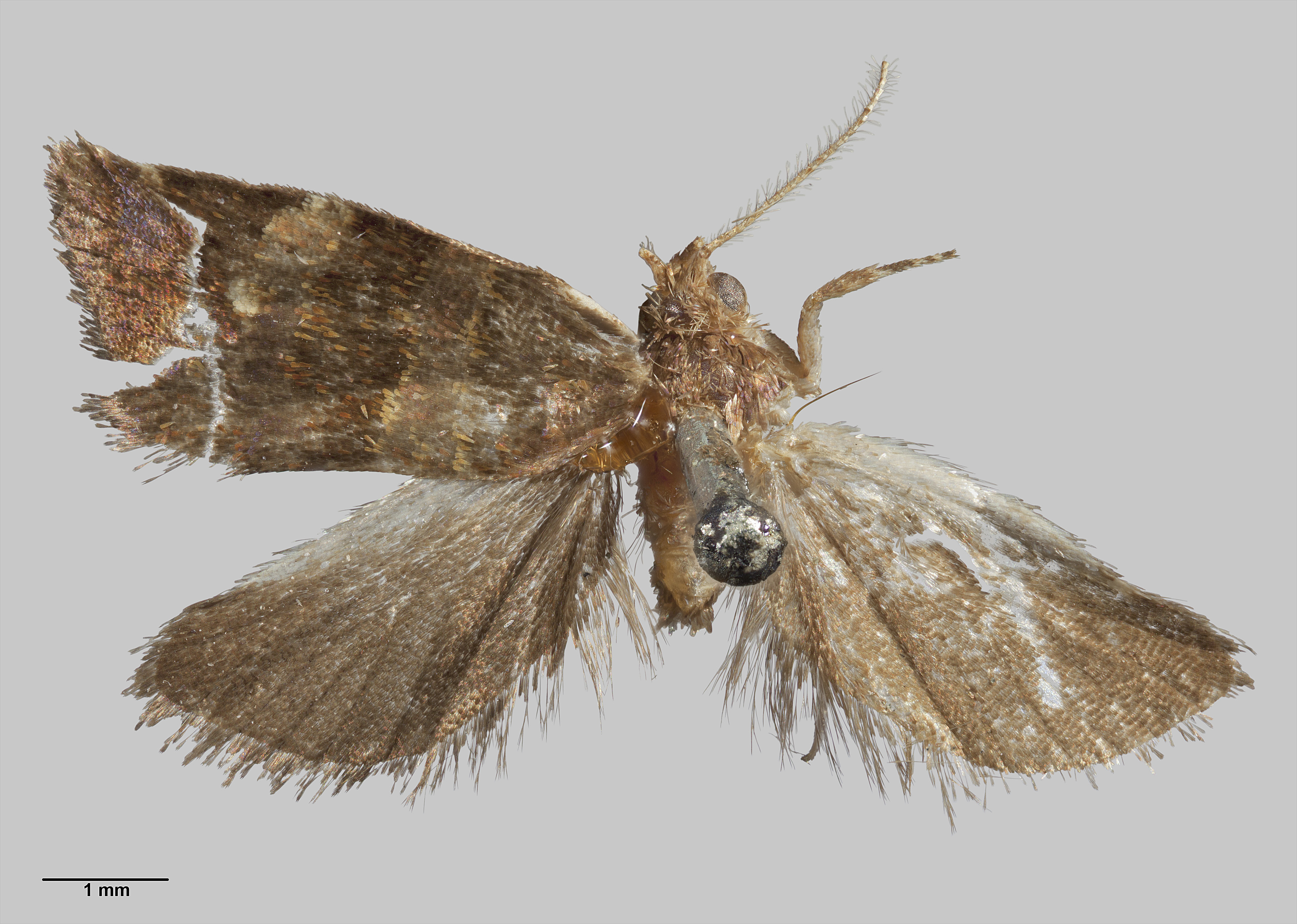

Scientific classification
- Domain: Eukaryota
- Kingdom: Animalia
- Phylum: Arthropoda
- Class: Insecta
- Order: Lepidoptera
- Family: Tortricidae
- Genus: Ecclitica
- Species: E. philpotti

Binomial name
- Ecclitica philpotti (Dugdale, 1978)

Synonyms
- Curvisaccula philpotti Dugdale, 1978; Tortrix encausta Philpott, 1930; Curvisacculus philpotti Dugdale, 1978

= Ecclitica philpotti =

Species of moth

Ecclitica philpotti, also known as the kātote ugly nestmaker, is a species of moth of the family Tortricidae. It is endemic to New Zealand and has been observed in the northern parts of the North Island. Adults have been collected on the wing in October and January.

== Taxonomy ==
This species was first validly described by John S. Dugdale in 1978 and named Curvisaccula philpotti. In 1930 Alfred Philpott attempted to describe this species under the name Tortrix encausta. However Philpott made an error as that name was preoccupied and as such Tortrix encausta Philpott, 1930 is a junior primary homonym of Tortrix encausta Meyrick, 1907. In 1939 George Hudson discussed this species under that name in his book A Supplement to the Butterflies and moths of New Zealand. Dugdale made the same error as Philpott when he attempted to place Tortrix encausta Philpott, 1930 in the genus Curvisaccula in 1966. Dugdale rectified this error in 1978 and validly named the species Curvisaccula philpotti. In 2010 the New Zealand Inventory of Biodiversity discussed this species under the name Ecclitica philpotti. The male holotype specimen, collected by Charles E. Clarke at Kaeo, is held at the Auckland War Memorial Museum.

== Description ==
Philpott described this species as follows:

♂. 11-12 mm. Head, palpi and thorax dark reddish brown. Antennae ochreous annulated with dark brown, ciliations in ♂ 3. Abdomen dark brown. Legs ochreous, mixed with brown. Forewings with costa strongly arched, moderate costal fold, apex subobtuse, termen subsinuate, rather oblique; purplish mixed with ochreous; basal patch extensive, outer margin almost straight, ochreous; a broad nearly straight slightly outwardly oblique median fascia; apical third of wing dark reddish brown enclosing a roundish spot of purplish before apex and some ochreous towards tornus: fringes brownish mixed with ochreous. Hindwings dark fuscous tinged with purplish: fringes dark fuscous with darker basal line.

== Distribution ==
This species is endemic to New Zealand. It has been observed in the northern parts of the North Island.

== Behaviour ==
E. philpotti has been observed on the wing in October and January. Adults of this species have been swept from the top of tree ferns.

== Hosts ==
It has been hypothesised that larvae of this species feed on the fronds of tree ferns.
