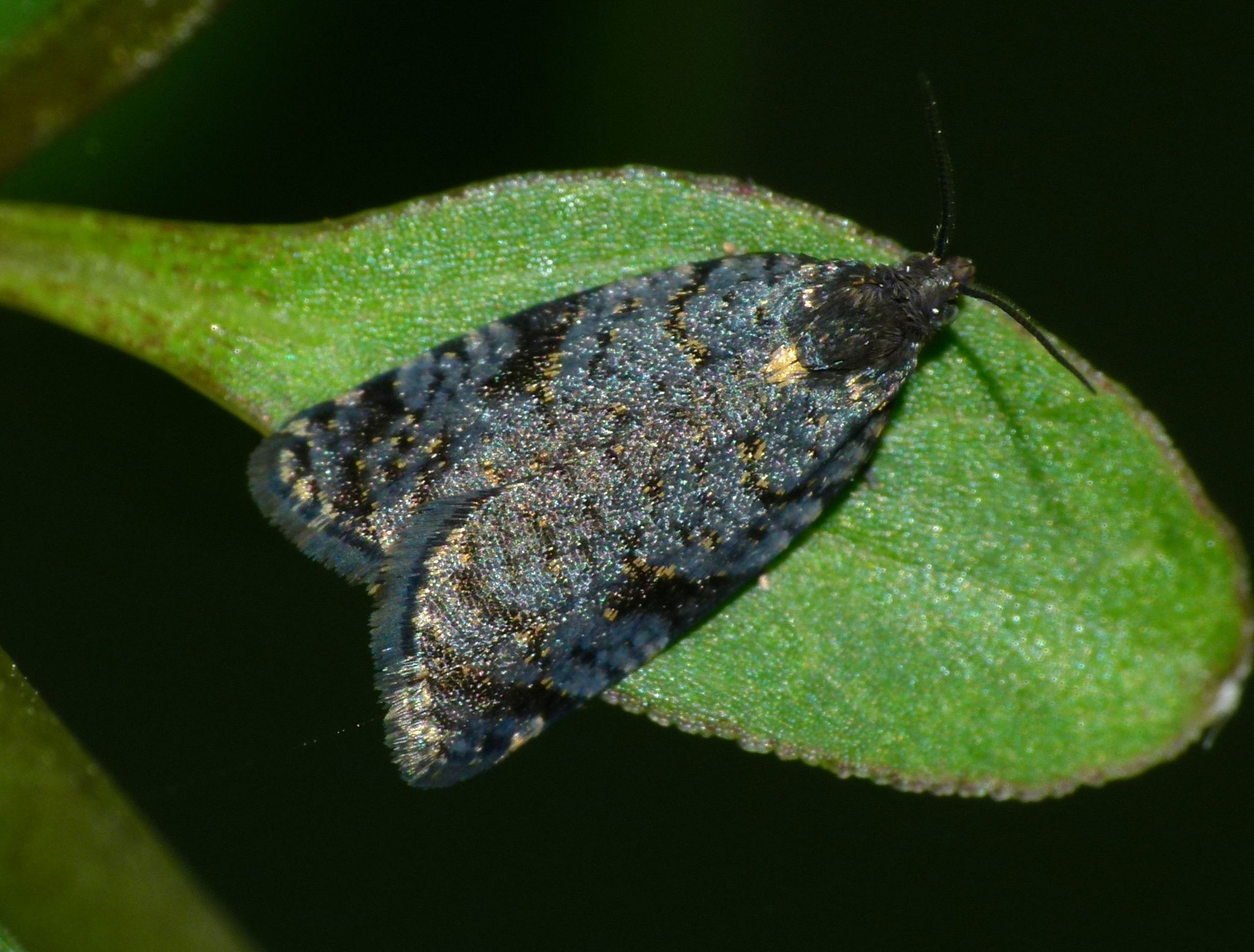

Scientific classification
- Kingdom: Animalia
- Phylum: Arthropoda
- Class: Insecta
- Order: Lepidoptera
- Family: Tortricidae
- Genus: Tortrix
- Species: T. molybditis

Binomial name
- Tortrix molybditis Meyrick, 1907

= Tortrix molybditis =

Species of moth, endemic to New Zealand

Tortrix molybditis is a species of moth of the family Tortricidae. It is endemic to New Zealand. It is likely that this species probably belongs to another genus and as such this species is also known as Tortrix (s.l.) molybditis.
