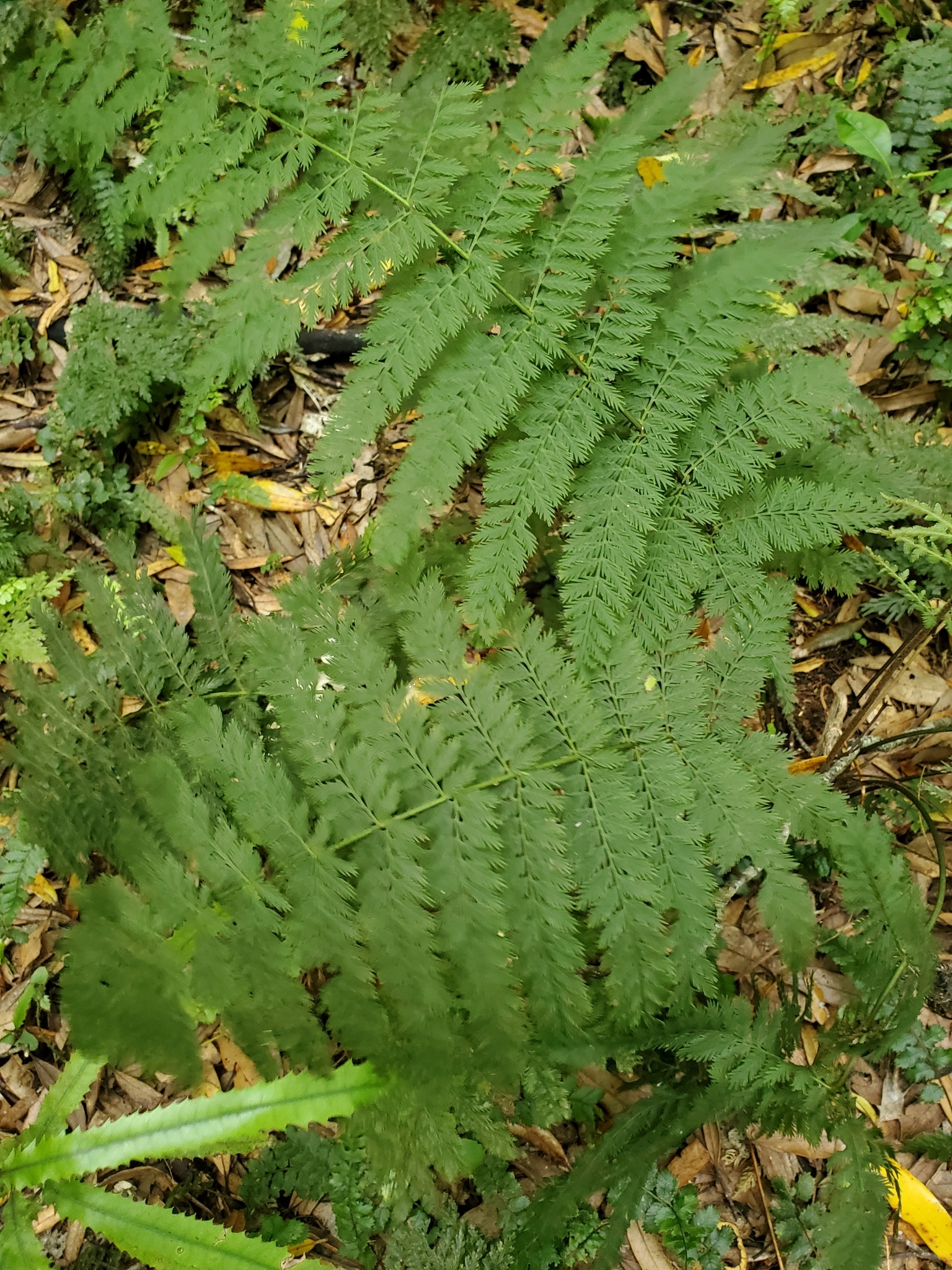

Scientific classification
- Kingdom: Plantae
- Clade: Tracheophytes
- Division: Polypodiophyta
- Class: Polypodiopsida
- Order: Osmundales
- Family: Osmundaceae
- Genus: Leptopteris
- Species: L. hymenophylloides

Binomial name
- Leptopteris hymenophylloides (A.Rich.) C.Presl

= Leptopteris hymenophylloides =

Crepe fern

Species of fern

Leptopteris hymenophylloides, which is commonly called single crepe fern is a fern in the family Osmundaceae.

It is endemic to New Zealand at North Island: Northland, Auckland, Volcanic Plateau, Gisborne, Taranaki, Southern North Island.

South Island: Western Nelson, Sounds-Nelson, Marlborough, Westland, Canterbury Otago, Southland Fiordland.

Chatham Islands, Stewart Island. Altitudinal range: 10–950 m.

The species has a predominantly northern distribution. It is abundant in much of the North Island, especially in lowland and montane areas, from 10 to 950 m, but is uncommon in truly coastal regions, especially on the east coast and in Taranaki. In the South Island it is more common in lowland regions, but extends locally to 925 m in montane areas of inland Marlborough; it is absent from much of the high country.
