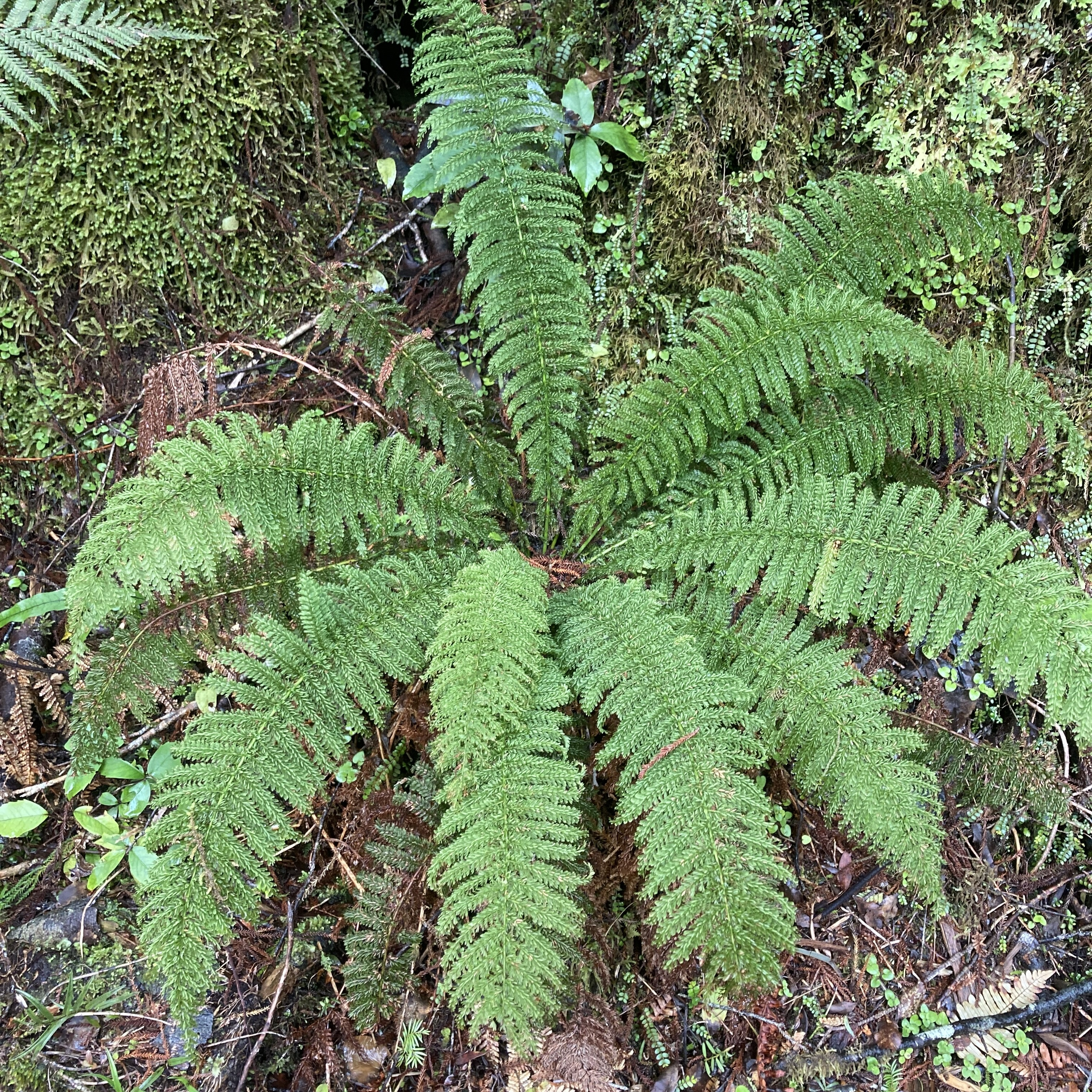

Scientific classification
- Kingdom: Plantae
- Clade: Tracheophytes
- Division: Polypodiophyta
- Class: Polypodiopsida
- Order: Osmundales
- Family: Osmundaceae
- Genus: Leptopteris
- Species: L. superba

Binomial name
- Leptopteris superba (Colenso) C.Presl, 1848

Synonyms
- Osmunda superba (Colenso) J.B.Armstr.; Todea superba Colenso

= Leptopteris superba =

Prince of Wales feather

Species of fern

Leptopteris superba, commonly called Prince of Wales feathers or common crape fern, is a fern in the genus Leptopteris.

It is considered endemic to New Zealand at North Island: Northland, Auckland, Volcanic Plateau, Gisborne, Taranaki, Southern North Island.

South Island: Western Nelson, Sounds-Nelson, Westland, Canterbury, Otago, Southland Fiordland.

Stewart Island. Altitudinal range: 0–1600 m.

Leptopteris superba has a predominantly southern distribution, occurring from Mt. Te Aroha southwards, apart from an isolated record (Rawlings 1972) from c. 700 m in Waipoua Forest (CHR 191223) and a 19th-century collection by E.M. Smith from Little Barrier Island (AK 119092).

In the North Island it is common in montane forest from Te Aroha to Wellington, occurring from about 250 m up to 1400 m on Maungapōhatu in the Urewera Ranges.

In the South Island it is abundant in wet forest on the west side of the Main Divide, in the Marlborough Sounds, and around Dunedin and the Catlins, extending also to Stewart Island. It occurs from sea level in Fiordland to about 1600 m in the Takitimu Ranges near Monowai.

It is characterized by having large fronds (around a meter in length) with large sporangia on their undersides. The shape of the fronds is elliptical (similar to that of Ostrich Fern). It grows from wet lowlands to montane forests. Notably, its leaves are a single cell thick.
