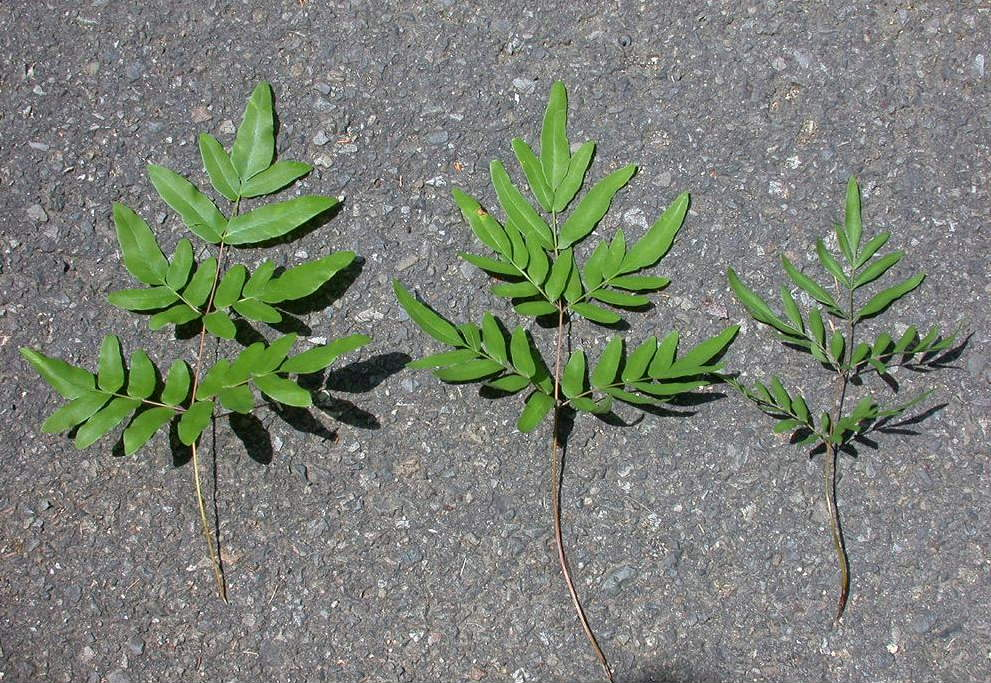
- O. japonica, O. × intermedia, and O. lancea

Scientific classification
- Kingdom: Plantae
- Clade: Tracheophytes
- Division: Polypodiophyta
- Class: Polypodiopsida
- Order: Osmundales
- Family: Osmundaceae
- Genus: Osmunda
- Species: O. × intermedia

Binomial name
- Osmunda × intermedia Sugim.

= Osmunda × intermedia =

Species of fern

Osmunda × intermedia is a semifertile hybrid between Osmunda japonica and Osmunda lancea.
