= O. japonica =

O. japonica may refer to:

- Obesotoma japonica, a sea snail species
- Olivella japonica, a sea snail species
- Orixa japonica, a shrub of Japan and Korea
- Osmunda japonica, the Japanese royal fern or Japanese flowering fern, a fern species native to eastern Asia, including Japan, China, Korea, Taiwan and the far east of Russia on Sakhalin
- Ostrya japonica, the Japanese hop-hornbeam, a tree species native to Japan, Korea and China

== See also ==
- Japonica (disambiguation)
