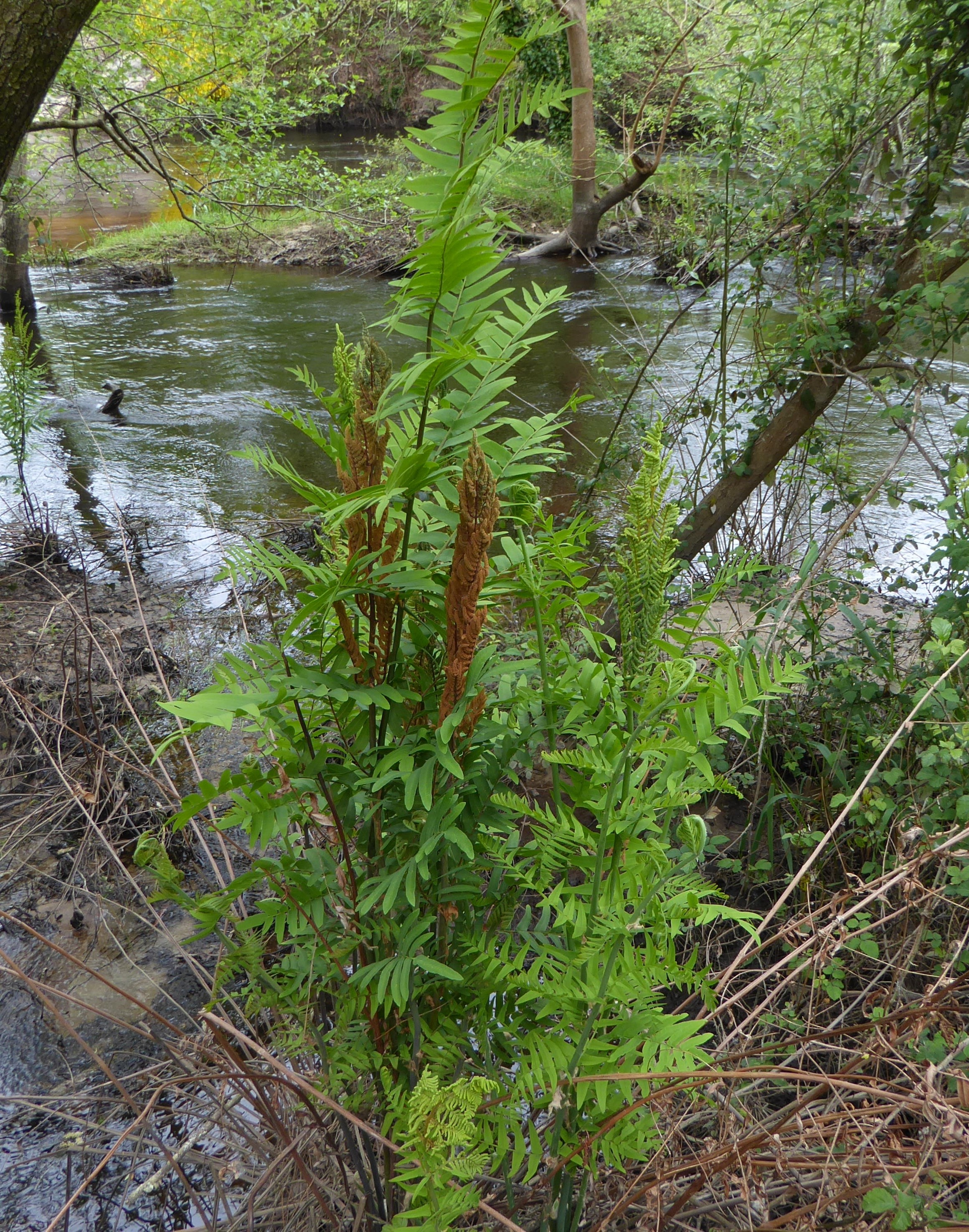

Conservation status
- Least Concern (IUCN 3.1)

Scientific classification
- Kingdom: Plantae
- Clade: Tracheophytes
- Division: Polypodiophyta
- Class: Polypodiopsida
- Order: Osmundales
- Family: Osmundaceae
- Genus: Osmunda
- Species: O. regalis

Binomial name
- Osmunda regalis L.
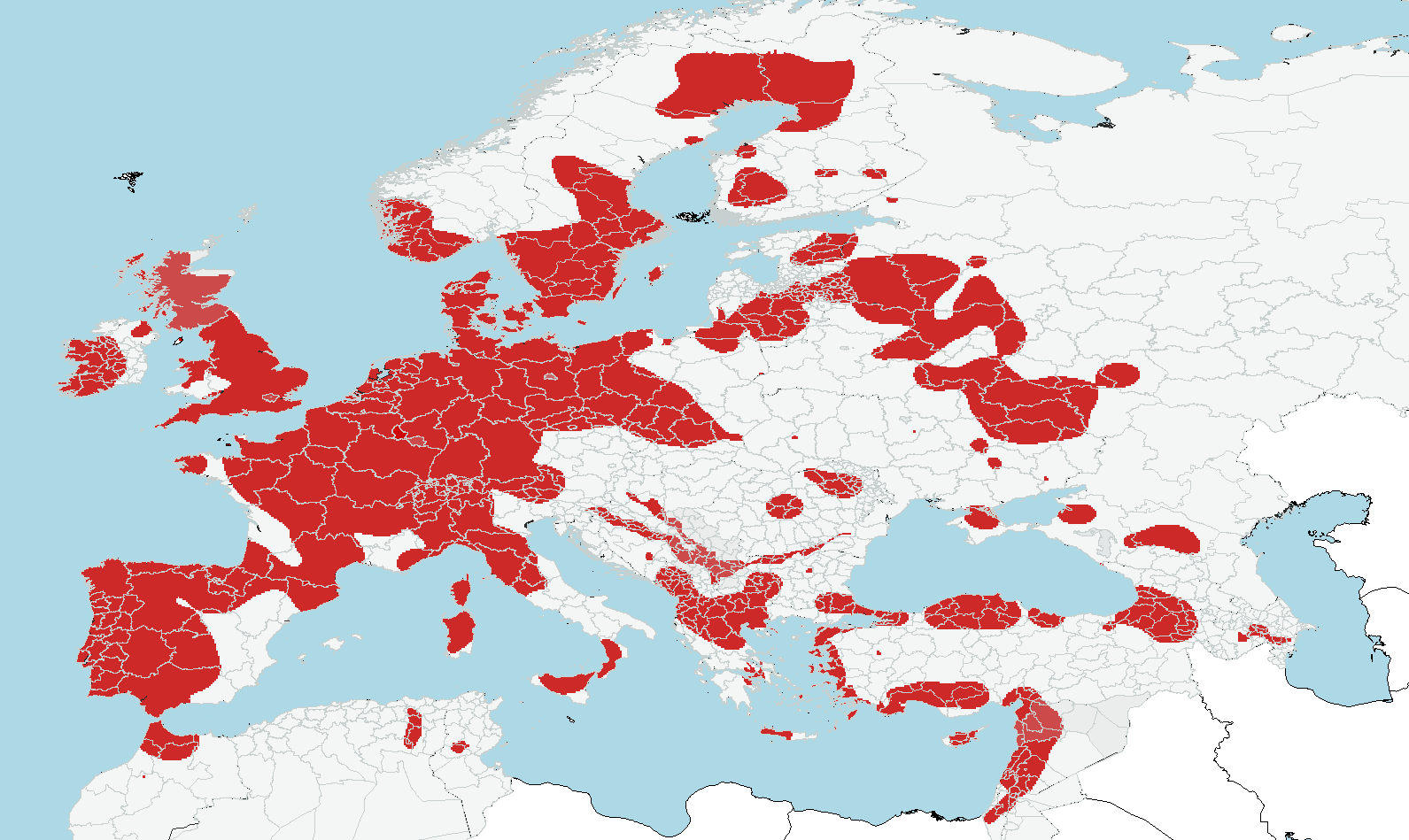
- Distribution map

= Osmunda regalis =

Species of fern

Osmunda regalis, or royal fern, is a species of deciduous fern, native to Europe, North Africa and West Asia, growing in woodland bogs and on the banks of streams. The species is sometimes known as flowering fern due to the appearance of its fertile fronds.

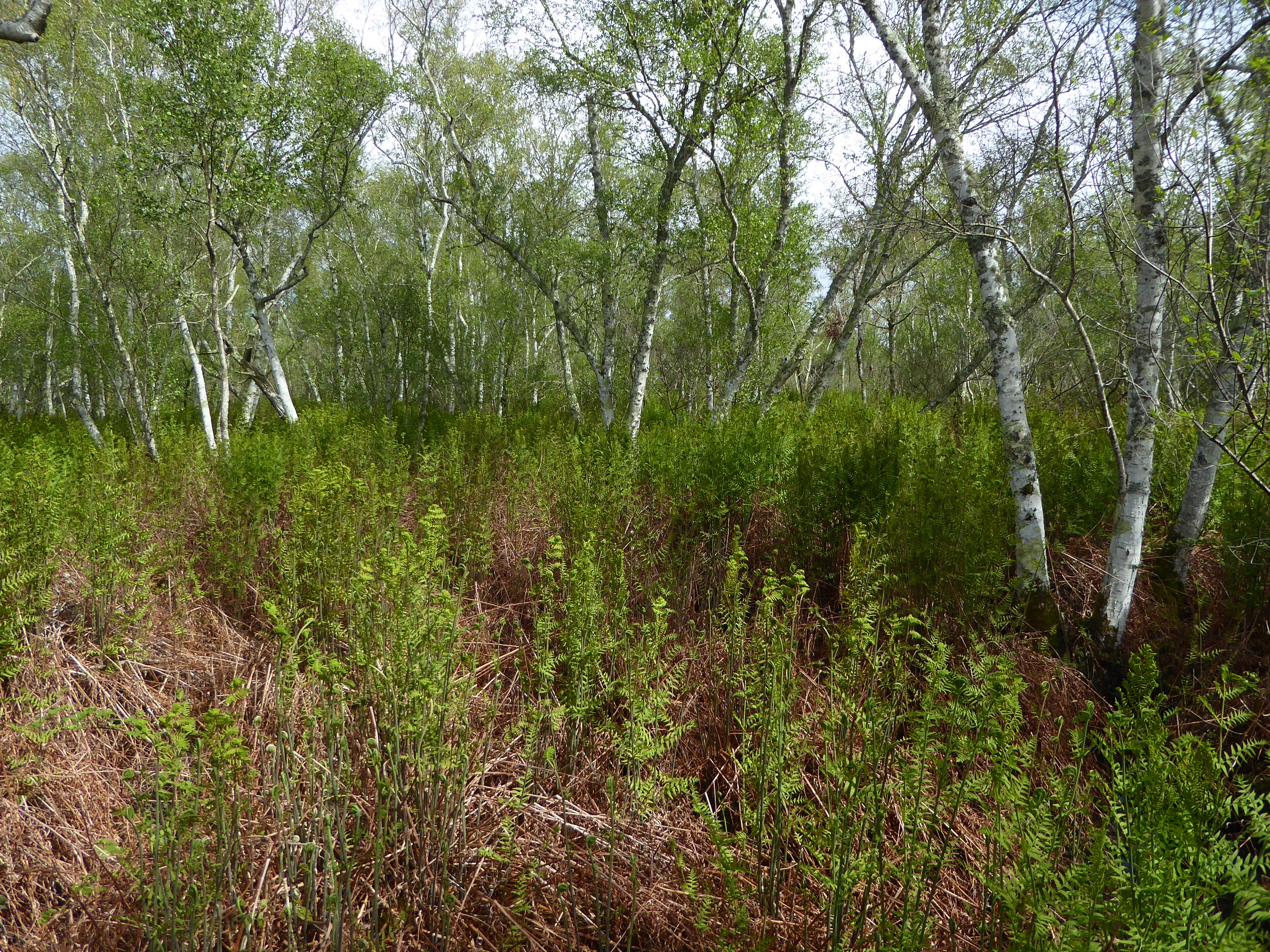
Royal fern swamp at Lagune de Contaut, Hourtin, France

== Description ==
Royal fern is a large perennial herb with stout ascending rhizomes that over many years build up a woody, trunk-like base covered by interwoven roots, 1 m or more high. The fronds, or leaves, arise directly from this rhizome and are very large, typically up to 120 cm but exceptionally as much as 400 cm long and 30-40 cm broad. Each frond is bipinnate, with 5–9 pairs of pinnae up to 30 cm (12 in) long, each pinna with 7–13 pairs of pinnules 2.5–6.5 cm (0.98–2.56 in) long and 1–2 cm (0.39–0.79 in) broad. Many of the fronds have a terminal fertile portion, where the blade is reduced almost to the midrib and densely covered with brown sporangia.

The fronds are at first covered with golden-brown hairs which quickly disappear, leaving a smooth, pale green surface to the leaves. Veins are prominent on both surfaces.

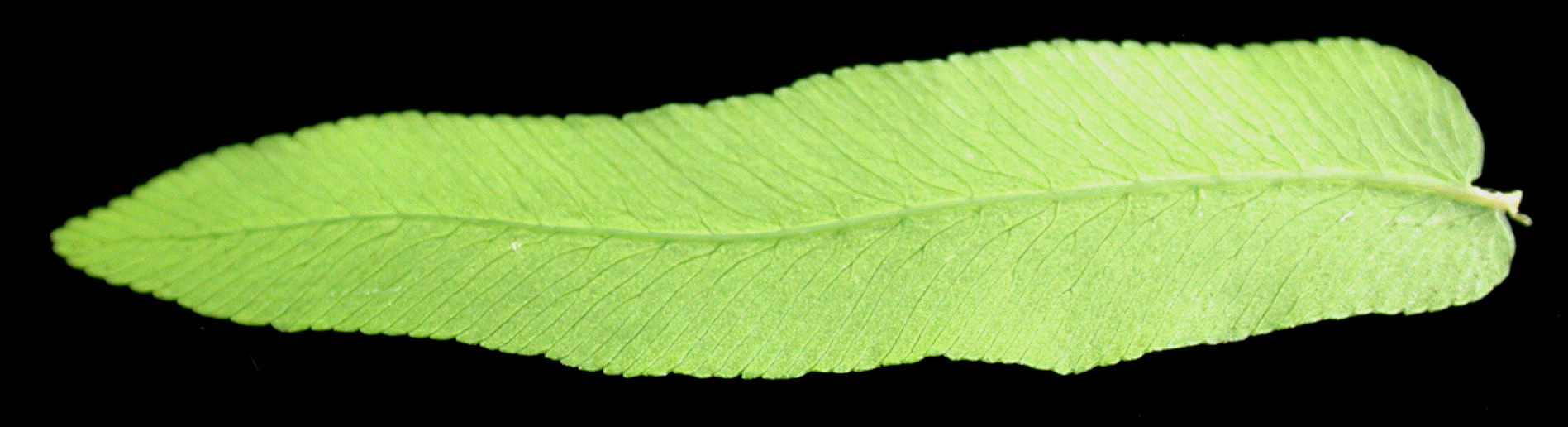
The leaves have prominent, branched veins.

In the gametophyte stage, the prothallus is a small, green, fleshy plant just a few millimetres in size.

== Distribution and status ==
The native range of royal fern is throughout Europe, North Africa and the Middle East as far as Iran, from Norway south to Algeria. It is listed as introduced in New Zealand, but its presence throughout North America is based on the taxonomic uncertainty about whether Osmunda spectabilis should be considered a separate species or not.

In many areas, O. regalis has become rare as a result of wetland drainage for agriculture.

== Taxonomy ==
The name Osmunda possibly derives from Osmunder, a Saxon name for the god Thor. The name "royal fern" derives from its being one of the largest and most imposing European ferns. The name has been qualified as "old world royal fern" in some American literature to distinguish it from the closely related American royal fern, O. spectabilis. However this terminology is not found in British literature.

== Evolution ==
The oldest known fossils of Osmunda date to the Paleocene, Osmunda likely derives from fossil species currently assigned to Claytosmunda.

== Varieties ==
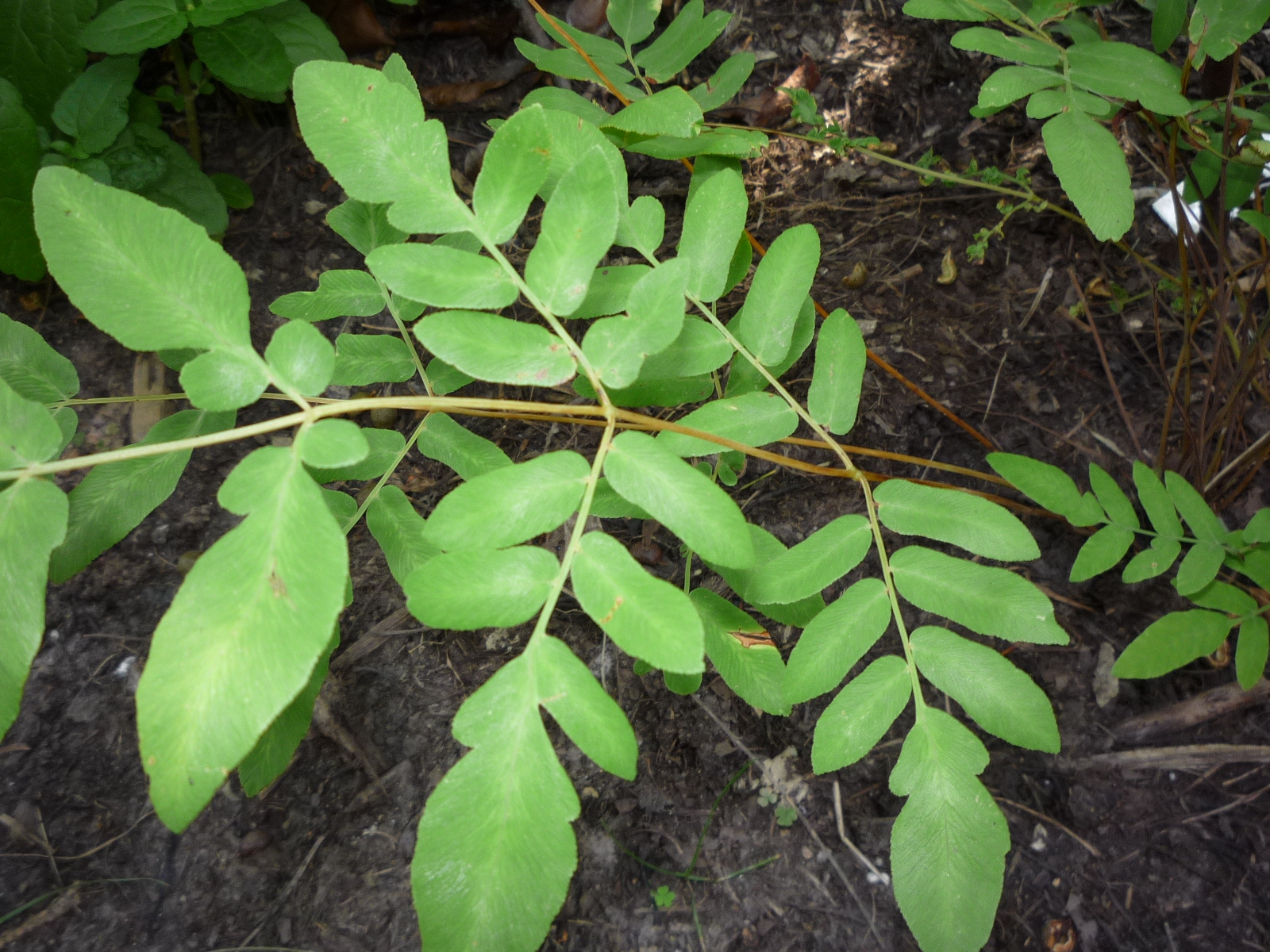
Closeup of sterile frond

There are three to four varieties as traditionally construed:

- Osmunda regalis var. regalis. Europe, Africa, southwest Asia. Sterile fronds to 160 cm tall.
- Osmunda regalis var. panigrahiana R.D.Dixit. Southern Asia (India).
- Osmunda regalis var. brasiliensis (Hook. & Grev.) Pic. Serm. Tropical regions of Central and South America; treated as a synonym of var. spectabilis by some authors.
- Osmunda regalis var. spectabilis (Willdenow) A.Gray. Eastern North America. Sterile fronds to 100 cm tall. Now accepted as a separate species, Osmunda spectabilis.

== Similar species ==
There are three very similar species, Osmunda spectabilis, Osmunda lancea and Osmunda japonica. Recent genetic analysis (Metzgar et al., 2008) has shown that the New World varieties are in a clade that is sister to the Old World varieties of Osmunda regalis. If this is true, then O. lancea and O. japonica should either be regarded as varieties of O. regalis, or, conversely, O. regalis var. spectabilis should be regarded as a separate species, Osmunda spectabilis Willdenow. The var. brasiliensis would then be Osmunda spectabilis Willdenow var. brasiliensis Hooker & Greville.

== Cultivation ==
Osmunda regalis is widely cultivated in temperate regions. The species and the cultivar 'Cristata' have both gained the Royal Horticultural Society's Award of Garden Merit. Osmunda plants should be planted in preferably acidic, moist soil, associating well with other large moisture-loving plants such as Rodgersia and Gunnera. However, it tolerates a range of soil and climatic conditions.

== Other uses ==
The roots, along with those of other species of Osmunda, are used for the production of osmunda fibre, used as a growing medium for cultivated orchids and other epiphytic plants.

According to Slavic mythology, the sporangia, called "Perun's flowers", have assorted magical powers, such as giving their holders the ability to defeat demons, fulfill wishes, unlock secrets, and understand the language of trees. However, collecting the sporangia is a difficult and frightening process. In earlier traditions, they must be collected on Kupala Night; later, after the arrival of Christianity, the date is changed to Easter eve. Either way, the person wanting to collect Perun's flowers must stand within a circle drawn around the plant and withstand the taunting or threats of demons.

The young shoots of the fern are, along with the similar shoots of many other fern species, known in some places as fiddleheads, and eaten as food, thought to have an asparagus-like taste.
