= Begonia rhoephila =

Scientific classification
- Kingdom: Plantae
- Clade: Tracheophytes
- Clade: Angiosperms
- Clade: Eudicots
- Clade: Rosids
- Order: Cucurbitales
- Family: Begoniaceae
- Genus: Begonia
- Species: B. rhoephila

Binomial name
- Begonia rhoephila Ridl.

Synonyms
- Begonia collina Irmsch.

Species of flowering plant

Begonia rhoephila, the stream begonia, or jungle stream begonia is a species of flowering plant in the family Begoniaceae, endemic to Peninsular Malaya.

== Habitat and ecology ==
Begonia rhoephila is endemic to Selangor, where it is only known in the foothills of the Titiwangsa Mountains.

B. rhoephila is rheophytic, and grows in or besides rocky streams about 15 mm above the normal water level and downstream on boulders.

== Etymology ==
In Greek, rhoe means "stream", and philos means "love". Like the common name, this species' binomial name refers to its habitat.
