= Osmunda vancouverensis =

Scientific classification
- Kingdom: Plantae
- Clade: Tracheophytes
- Division: Polypodiophyta
- Class: Polypodiopsida
- Order: Osmundales
- Family: Osmundaceae
- Genus: Osmunda
- Species: †O. vancouverensis

Binomial name
- †Osmunda vancouverensis Vavrek, Stockey et Rothwell

Extinct species of fern

Osmunda vancouverensis is an extinct species of Osmunda ferns. The name is used to refer to permineralized fertile frond segments found in the Lower Cretaceous of British Columbia (specifically, Vancouver Island).
