= Bucephalandra tetana =

Scientific classification
- Kingdom: Plantae
- Clade: Tracheophytes
- Clade: Angiosperms
- Clade: Monocots
- Order: Alismatales
- Family: Araceae
- Genus: Bucephalandra
- Species: B. tetana

Binomial name
- Bucephalandra tetana S.Y.Wong & P.C.Boyce

Species of plant

Bucephalandra tetana is a species of flowering plant in the family Araceae, native to Kalimantan on Borneo. It is a petite rheophyte, found on mossy granite rocks alongside rivers.
