= Osmunda × mildei =

Scientific classification
- Kingdom: Plantae
- Clade: Tracheophytes
- Division: Polypodiophyta
- Class: Polypodiopsida
- Order: Osmundales
- Family: Osmundaceae
- Genus: Osmunda
- Species: O. × mildei

Binomial name
- Osmunda × mildei C.Chr.

Species of fern

Osmunda × mildei is a rare fern, known only from a few locations in the area of Hong Kong. It is also a rarity in that it appears to be a species of hybrid origin within the Osmundaceae. Its putative parents are Osmunda japonica and Plenasium vachellii or P. angustifolium.

William Jackson Hooker published a sketch of this species in his Filices Exoticae (completed in 1859), plate 9. He designated it as Osmunda bipinnata, but his name was invalid because it had already been used by Linnaeus for another species, later reclassified as Anemia bipinnata.
