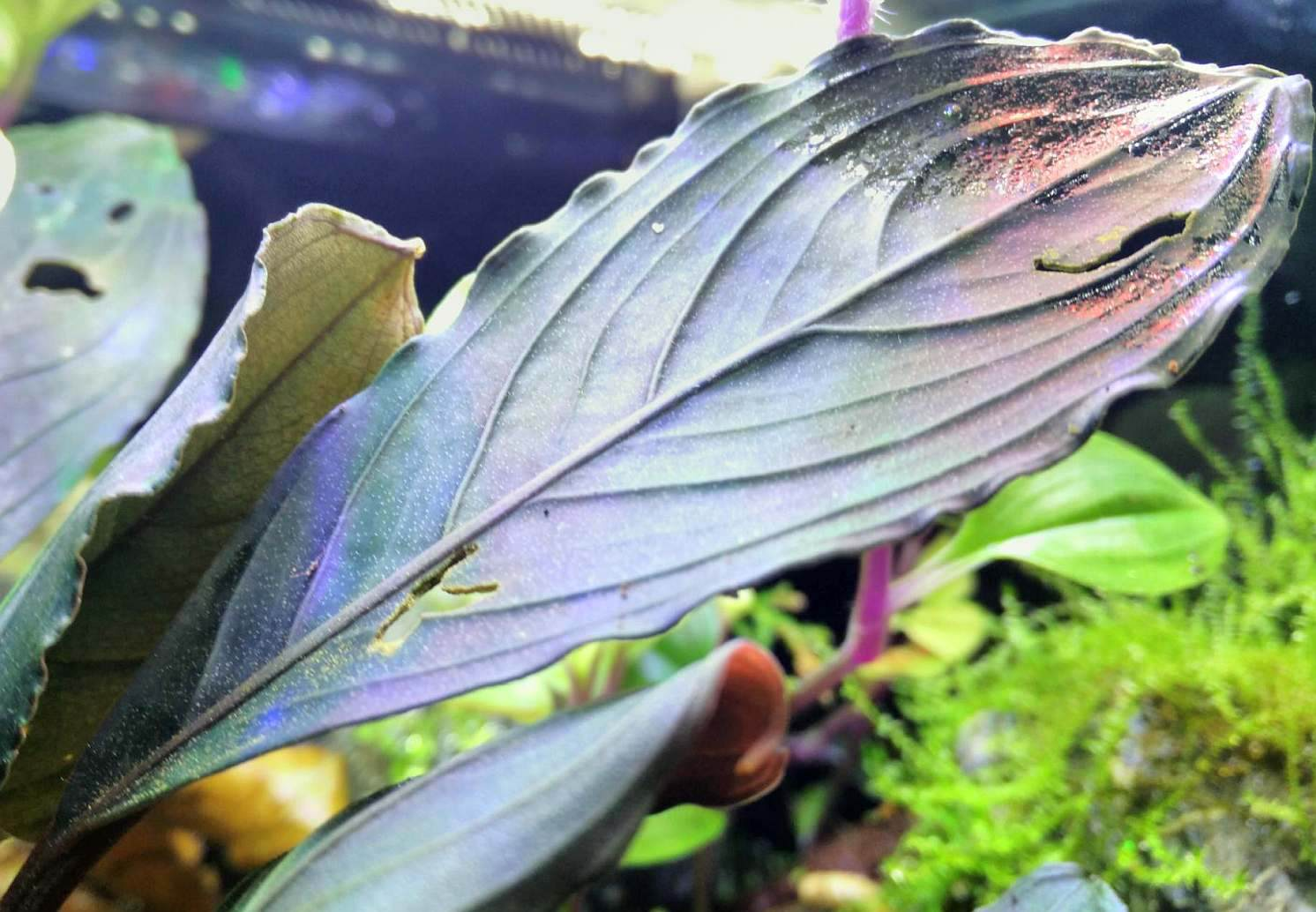
- Decorative leaf of a red-black Bucephalandra kishii

Scientific classification
- Kingdom: Plantae
- Clade: Tracheophytes
- Clade: Angiosperms
- Clade: Monocots
- Order: Alismatales
- Family: Araceae
- Genus: Bucephalandra
- Species: B. kishii

Binomial name
- Bucephalandra kishii S.Y.Wong & P.C.Boyce

= Bucephalandra kishii =

Species of plant

Bucephalandra kishii is a species of flowering plant in the family Araceae, native to Kalimantan on Borneo. It is a facultative rheophyte, found on granite along high altitude riversides.
