= Bucephalandra chrysokoupa =

Scientific classification
- Kingdom: Plantae
- Clade: Tracheophytes
- Clade: Angiosperms
- Clade: Monocots
- Order: Alismatales
- Family: Araceae
- Genus: Bucephalandra
- Species: B. chrysokoupa

Binomial name
- Bucephalandra chrysokoupa S.Y.Wong & P.C.Boyce

Species of plant

Bucephalandra chrysokoupa is a species of flowering plant in the family Araceae, native to Kalimantan on Borneo. It is an obligate rheophyte, found on granite boulders along riversides.
