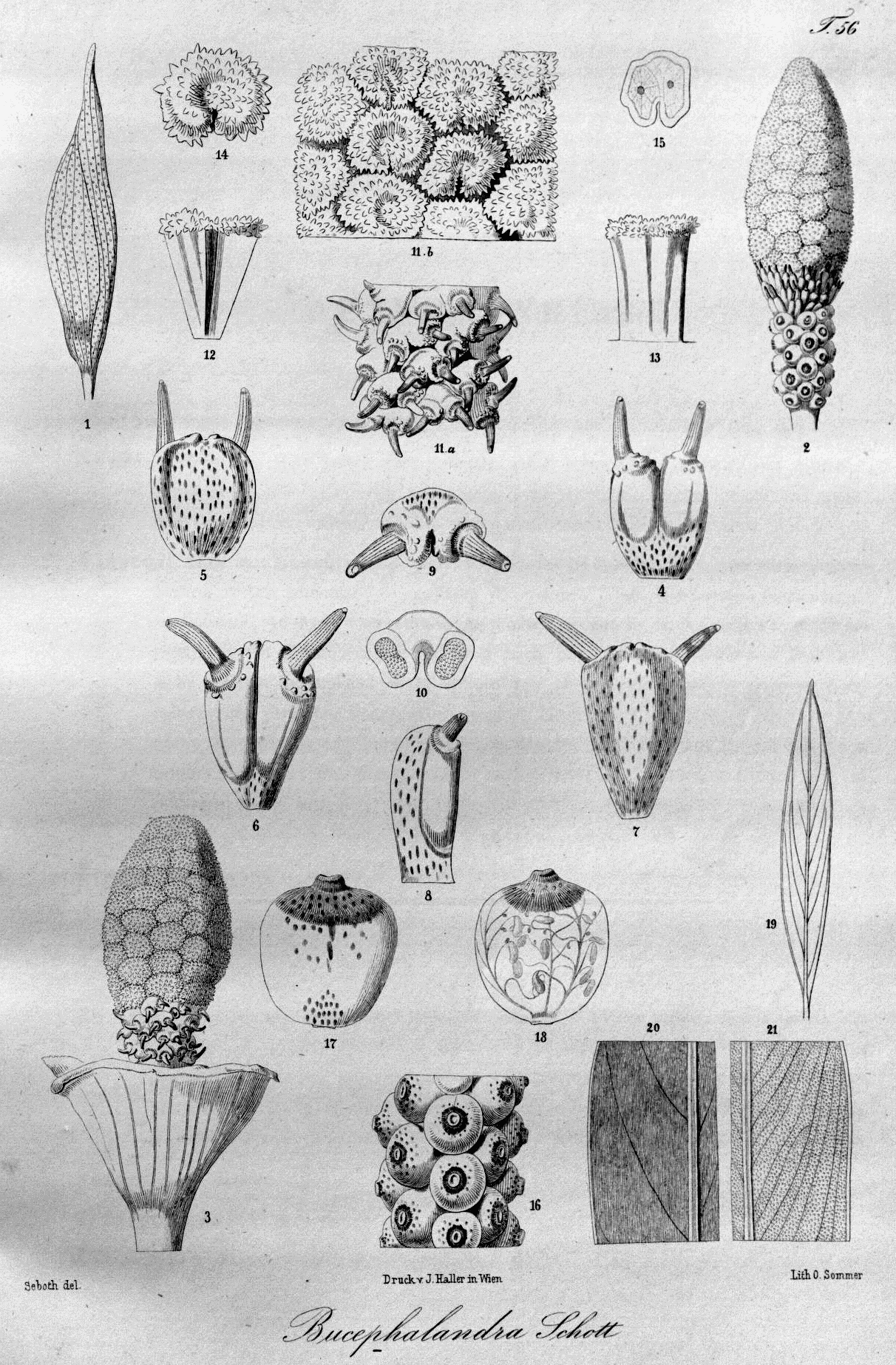
- 1858 illustration

Scientific classification
- Kingdom: Plantae
- Clade: Tracheophytes
- Clade: Angiosperms
- Clade: Monocots
- Order: Alismatales
- Family: Araceae
- Subfamily: Aroideae
- Tribe: Schismatoglottideae
- Genus: Bucephalandra; Schott 1858

Synonyms
- Microcasia Becc.

= Bucephalandra =

Genus of flowering plants

Bucephalandra is a genus of flowering plants in the family Araceae. As of 2026 there are 32 species of Bucephalandra which have been discovered in Borneo and have been formally described by S.Y. Wong and P.C. Boyce. So far, all described species have only been recorded from Borneo. Bucephalandra are usually found growing as dense mats over stones or rocks in streams or rivers in moist tropical forest.

== Etymology ==
Bucephalandra is derived from Greek words, βοῦς (bous; bull or cow), κεφαλή (kephalē; head) and ἀνήρ (anēr; man), referring to the shape of the single male (staminate) flowers.

== Description ==
These rheophytic (very seldom facultative) herbs can be minute to rather large, about 2 cm to 60 cm tall. Their stems are creeping and rooting, with a few or many leaves. The leaves can be quite delicate or tough and their shapes can be elliptic, oblong, linear, oblanceolate or obovate. Most of the leaf surfaces are rather glossy and the colours of the leaf range from dark blue-green to green, often with white to yellow to red tinges or spots on the back of the leaves.

The inflorescence can be solitary or in pair to several. Spathes are mostly white with flush (a few of them are yellow) and shapes can be ellipsoid to lanceolate, narrowing to a point. The limbs (upper part of spathes) drop off during staminate anthesis, leaving the persistent funnel-shaped lower part of the spathe. Spadix consist of a few or no pistillodes at the base, pistillate zone, a few rows of scale-like motile staminodes (interstice staminodes), staminate zone, and appendix. Pistils are depressed globose or depressed trapezoidal in shape, 1-locular and with many ovules. Stamens consist of short filaments with thecae at the tip, dehiscing by a pore. Pollens squeezed out from the theca pore like a droplet.

Fruits are berries with round to ellipsoidal shapes. The seeds of Bucephalandra are dispersed by splash-cup mechanism; water droplets splash into the funnel-shape lower spathe and this motion ejects the seeds. The seeds will then anchor on the mosses or tiny fissures on the surrounding rock.

== Anthesis and role of interstice staminodes ==
The scale-like motile staminodes sandwiched by pistillate and staminate flower zones are called interstice staminodes. These staminodes play a role in controlling pollinators' access to the pistillate flower zone and to protect the developing fruits.

During pistillate anthesis, the spathe inflates to create a slit in the limb, stigmas become sticky and emit odour to attract pollinators, and the interstice staminodes and thecae erect, allowing pollinators to access pistillate zone. When stigmas become non-receptive, the interstice staminodes begin to lower and seal off the lower spathe.

During staminate athesis, the staminate flower thecae point upward and emit odour. Shortly after that, the limb splits away from the lower spathe, coincidentally pollen droplet extrudes from the tips of the theca horns.

Once the fertilization is successful, the interstice staminodes become photosynthetic, thicken, and harden until the fruits are fully developed. The enlarged berries push the staminodes up and staminodes shed away. The fruits are exposed and quickly become gooey pulp embedded with seeds.

== Aquarist use ==
Bucephalandra, a relatively recent addition to the aquarium hobby, has quickly risen in popularity among aquarists. Native to the streams of Borneo, it was introduced to aquarium enthusiasts seeking new and unique plant options. Known for its slow growth, diverse leaf shapes, and striking colors, Bucephalandra offers a different aesthetic compared to traditional choices like Anubias or Java fern. Its iridescent leaves and ease of care have made it a favorite in the aquascaping community.

== Species ==
- Bucephalandra adei S.Y.Wong, Hii & P.C.Boyce
- Bucephalandra akantha S.Y.Wong & P.C.Boyce
- Bucephalandra aurantiitheca S.Y.Wong & P.C.Boyce
- Bucephalandra belindae S.Y.Wong & P.C.Boyce
- Bucephalandra bogneri S.Y.Wong & P.C.Boyce
- Bucephalandra catherineae P.C.Boyce, Bogner & Mayo
- Bucephalandra chimaera S.Y.Wong & P.C.Boyce
- Bucephalandra chrysokoupa S.Y.Wong & P.C.Boyce
- Bucephalandra danumensis S.Y.Wong, P.C.Boyce & Kartini
- Bucephalandra diabolica S.Y.Wong & P.C.Boyce
- Bucephalandra elliptica (Engl.) S.Y.Wong & P.C.Boyce
- Bucephalandra filiformis S.Y.Wong & P.C.Boyce
- Bucephalandra forcipula S.Y.Wong & P.C.Boyce
- Bucephalandra gigantea Bogner
- Bucephalandra goliath S.Y.Wong & P.C.Boyce
- Bucephalandra kerangas S.Y.Wong & P.C.Boyce
- Bucephalandra kishii S.Y.Wong & P.C.Boyce
- Bucephalandra magnifolia H. Okada & Y. Mori
- Bucephalandra micrantha S.Y.Wong & P.C.Boyce
- Bucephalandra minotaur S.Y.Wong & P.C.Boyce
- Bucephalandra motleyana Schott
- Bucephalandra muluensis (M. Hotta) S.Y.Wong & P.C.Boyce
- Bucephalandra oblanceolata (M. Hotta) S.Y.Wong & P.C.Boyce
- Bucephalandra oncophora S.Y.Wong & P.C.Boyce
- Bucephalandra pubes S.Y.Wong & P.C.Boyce
- Bucephalandra pygmaea (Becc.) P.C.Boyce & S.Y.Wong
- Bucephalandra sordidula S.Y.Wong & P.C.Boyce
- Bucephalandra spathulifolia Engl. ex S.Y.Wong & P.C.Boyce
- Bucephalandra tetana S.Y.Wong & P.C.Boyce
- Bucephalandra ultramafica S.Y.Wong & P.C.Boyce
- Bucephalandra vespula S.Y.Wong & P.C.Boyce
- Bucephalandra yengiae S.Y.Wong & P.C.Boyce
