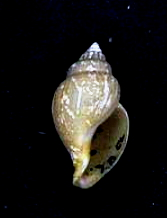
- Shell of Obesotoma gigantea (museum specimen from Naturalis Biodiversity Center)

Scientific classification
- Kingdom: Animalia
- Phylum: Mollusca
- Class: Gastropoda
- Subclass: Caenogastropoda
- Order: Neogastropoda
- Superfamily: Conoidea
- Family: Mangeliidae
- Genus: Obesotoma
- Species: O. gigantea

Binomial name
- Obesotoma gigantea (Mörch, 1869)

Synonyms
- Bela gigantea (Mörch, 1869); Pleurotoma (Bela) violacea var. gigantea Mörch, 1869; Pleurotoma gigantea Moerch, 1869 (original combination)

= Obesotoma gigantea =

Species of gastropod

Obesotoma gigantea is a species of sea snail, a marine gastropod mollusk in the family Mangeliidae.

== Description ==
The length varies between 12 mm and 25 mm. It differs from Obesotoma gigas (Verkrüzen, 1875) in a more produced, curved siphonal canal.

== Distribution ==
This marine species is found from Eastern Greenland to Severnaya Zemlya, Russia.
