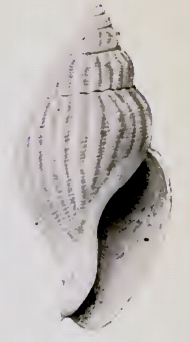
- Original image of a shell of Obesotoma cymata

Scientific classification
- Kingdom: Animalia
- Phylum: Mollusca
- Class: Gastropoda
- Subclass: Caenogastropoda
- Order: Neogastropoda
- Superfamily: Conoidea
- Family: Mangeliidae
- Genus: Obesotoma
- Species: O. cymata

Binomial name
- Obesotoma cymata (Dall, 1919)

Synonyms
- Lora tenuilirata var. cymata Dall, 1919 (basionym)

= Obesotoma cymata =

Species of gastropod

Obesotoma cymata is a species of sea snail, a marine gastropod mollusk in the family Mangeliidae.

== Description ==
The length of the shell attains 23 mm, its diameter 10.5 mm.

(Original description) The shell resembles typical Obesotoma tenuilirata (Dall, 1871, but with a higher and more acute spire, and with 20 or more narrow axial riblets on the body whorl, obsolete on the base, and a single spiral thread at the shoulder.

== Distribution ==
This marine species occurs from Nunivak Island, Bering Sea, to the Shumagin Islands, Alaska.
