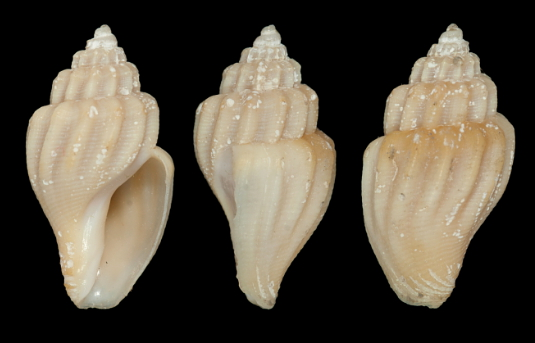
- Shell of Obesotoma solida (holotype at the Smithsonian Institution)

Scientific classification
- Kingdom: Animalia
- Phylum: Mollusca
- Class: Gastropoda
- Subclass: Caenogastropoda
- Order: Neogastropoda
- Superfamily: Conoidea
- Family: Mangeliidae
- Genus: Obesotoma
- Species: O. solida

Binomial name
- Obesotoma solida (Dall, 1887)

Synonyms
- Bela solida Dall, 1887

= Obesotoma solida =

Species of gastropod

Obesotoma solida is a species of sea snail, a marine gastropod mollusk in the family Mangeliidae.

== Description ==
There seems to be some confusion as to regards the synonyms of this species. Gastropods.com considers Lora quadra Dall, 1919 a synonym, while WoRMS considers Lora quadra a synonym of Oenopota quadra (Dall, 1919). Forster considers Bela solida Dall, 1887 (and Lora solida Dall, 1921) a synonym of Oenopota solida Dall, 1887, while WoRMS doesn't mention Oenopota solida.

== Distribution ==
This marine species occurs in the Sea of Japan and the Bering Sea to Puget Sound.
