= Obesotoma oyashio =

Scientific classification
- Kingdom: Animalia
- Phylum: Mollusca
- Class: Gastropoda
- Subclass: Caenogastropoda
- Order: Neogastropoda
- Superfamily: Conoidea
- Family: Mangeliidae
- Genus: Obesotoma
- Species: O. oyashio

Binomial name
- Obesotoma oyashio Shikama, 1962

Species of gastropod

Obesotoma oyashio is a species of sea snail, a marine gastropod mollusk in the family Mangeliidae.

== Description ==
The length of the shell attains 20 mm.

== Distribution ==
This species is found in the Sea of Japan.
