= Wessiea =

Wessiea Temporal range: Campanian - Langhian

Scientific classification
- Kingdom: Plantae
- Clade: Tracheophytes
- Division: Polypodiophyta
- Class: Polypodiopsida
- Order: Polypodiales
- Family: incertae sedis
- Genus: †Wessiea; Pigg & Rothwell, 2001

Species
- W. oroszii Rothwell, 2006; W. yakimaensis Pigg & Rothwell, 2001

Extinct genus of ferns

Wessiea is an extinct morphogenus of fern not placed in a specific family. Wessiea is known from Late Cretaceous and Middle Miocene age fossils found in Central Washington USA and Southern Alberta Canada. Two species are described in the morphogenus, W. oroszii and the type species W. yakimaensis.

== History and classification ==
The genus was first described from specimens of silicified rhizomes and frond bases in blocks of chert. The chert was recovered from the "Ho ho" site, one of the "county line hole" fossil localities north of Interstate 82 in Yakima County, Washington. The "Ho ho" site works strata which is part of the Museum Flow Package within the interbeds of the Sentinel Bluffs Unit of the central Columbia Plateau N_{2} Grande Ronde Basalt, Columbia River Basalt Group. The Museum Flow Package interbeds, designated the type locality, are dated to the middle Miocene and are approximately 15.6 million years old.

The holotype specimen, rhizomes and fronds #1–3 and 3 E2 #1–3, are preserved in chert block 3A1 and housed in the Burke Museum of Natural History and Culture as specimen number "UWBM 56441". The paratype, number 3F1 #2 top on specimen "UWBM 56441", is a rhizome which shows root gaps, roots and frond bases. The specimens of chert were studied by paleobotanists Kathleen B. Pigg of Arizona State University and Gar W. Rothwell of Ohio University. Pigg and Rothwell published their 2001 type description for Wessiea yakimaensis in the American Journal of Botany. In their type description they note the etymology for the generic name is in honor of Wesley C. Wehr for his numerous contributions to Tertiary paleobotany of western North America. The specific epithet yakimaensis, is a reference to the type locality in the Yakima Canyon. Pigg and Rothwell noted the similarity between Wessiea and both the modern genus Diplazium and the fossil genus Makotopteris.

The second species is known from ironstones of the Campanian age Horseshoe Canyon Formation, Alberta, recovered at the "Fred's site" locality. The fossils, housed in the Royal Tyrrell Museum of Palaeontology, were dissolved from the ironstone and embedded into a bioplastic for study. After embedding, the fossils were acid peeled by paleobotanists Rudolph Serbet and Gar W. Rothwell for study in thin section slides. Serbert and Rothell published the description of W. oroszii in a 2006 article. The specific epithet "oroszii" is a patronym honoring s Alfred Orosz, paleontologist for the Royal Tyrrell Museum, and discoverer of the species type locality.

== Description ==
The morphogenus is defined by the rhizomes and attached frond bases preserved by permineralization. The stipe shows the presence of two hippocampiform vascular bundles and the dictyostele is composed of forking meristeles.

=== W. oroszii ===
The rhizomes of W. oroszii are erect in positioning and grow up to 7 mm (0.28 in) in diameter, larger than W. yakimaensis. The dictyostele is made of five to seven oval meristeles and has a maximum diameter of 2.8 mm (0.11 in). The frond bases are flattened on the upper sides and generally produced by the rhizomes in groups of two to four in a helical arrangement.

=== W. yakimaensis ===
W. yakimaensis possesses rhizomes which are 1.5–3 mm (0.059–0.118 in) in diameter. The frond bases where preserved in the chert are in a distinct helical arrangement and diverge from the center of the arrangement in a recumbent positioning. The dictyostele is composed of four to five individual meristeles each being oval in outline. It is found in the chert blocks intertwined with the extinct Osmunda wehrii and anatomically preserved Anchistea virginica, which still lives in the forests of eastern coastal North America.
