= Osmunda claytoniites =

Scientific classification
- Kingdom: Plantae
- Clade: Tracheophytes
- Division: Polypodiophyta
- Class: Polypodiopsida
- Order: Osmundales
- Family: Osmundaceae
- Genus: Osmunda
- Species: †O. claytoniites

Binomial name
- †Osmunda claytoniites Carlie J.Phipps et al.

Extinct species of fern

Osmunda claytoniites is an extinct fern in the genus Osmunda, very similar to the extant fern Osmunda claytoniana. It has been found in the Upper Triassic of Antarctica.
