= Obesotoma tomiyaensis =

Scientific classification
- Kingdom: Animalia
- Phylum: Mollusca
- Class: Gastropoda
- Subclass: Caenogastropoda
- Order: Neogastropoda
- Superfamily: Conoidea
- Family: Mangeliidae
- Genus: Obesotoma
- Species: O. tomiyaensis

Binomial name
- Obesotoma tomiyaensis (Otuka, 1949)

Synonyms
- † Nematoma tomiyaensis (Otuka, 1949)

Species of gastropod

Obesotoma tomiyaensis is a species of sea snail, a marine gastropod mollusk in the family Mangeliidae.

== Description ==
The length of the shell attains 11 mm.

== Distribution ==
This species occurs from the Bering Strait to Cape Cod, Northeast USA.
