= Obesotoma iessoensis =

Scientific classification
- Kingdom: Animalia
- Phylum: Mollusca
- Class: Gastropoda
- Subclass: Caenogastropoda
- Order: Neogastropoda
- Superfamily: Conoidea
- Family: Mangeliidae
- Genus: Obesotoma
- Species: O. iessoensis

Binomial name
- Obesotoma iessoensis (E.A. Smith, 1875)

Synonyms
- Bela iessoensis E.A. Smith, 1875

Species of gastropod

Obesotoma iessoensis is a species of sea snail, a marine gastropod mollusk in the family Mangeliidae.

== Distribution ==
This species occurs in the Sea of Japan.
