= Obesotoma hokkaidoensis =

Scientific classification
- Kingdom: Animalia
- Phylum: Mollusca
- Class: Gastropoda
- Subclass: Caenogastropoda
- Order: Neogastropoda
- Superfamily: Conoidea
- Family: Mangeliidae
- Genus: Obesotoma
- Species: O. hokkaidoensis

Binomial name
- Obesotoma hokkaidoensis (Bartsch, 1941)

Synonyms
- Curtitoma hokkaidoensis (Barsch, 1941); Nematoma hokkaidoensis Bartsch, 1941

Species of gastropod

Obesotoma hokkaidoensis is a species of sea snail, a marine gastropod mollusk in the family Mangeliidae.

== Description ==
The length of the shell varies between 6.5 mm and 11.5 m.

== Distribution ==
This is a rare marine species occurring in low-boreal waters off Japan at depths between 167 m and 1600 m.
