= Obesotoma robusta =

Scientific classification
- Kingdom: Animalia
- Phylum: Mollusca
- Class: Gastropoda
- Subclass: Caenogastropoda
- Order: Neogastropoda
- Superfamily: Conoidea
- Family: Mangeliidae
- Genus: Obesotoma
- Species: O. robusta

Binomial name
- Obesotoma robusta (Packard, 1866)

Synonyms
- Bela robusta Packard, 1866; Oenopota raricostulata Golikov, A.N. in Golikov, A.N. & O.A. Skarlato, 1985

Species of gastropod

Obesotoma robusta is a species of sea snail, a marine gastropod mollusk in the family Mangeliidae.

== Description ==
The length of the shell varies between 8 mm and 16 mm.

== Distribution ==
Obesotoma robusta is found in the Sea of Japan, Sakhalin and off Northwest Canada.
