= Obesotoma starobogatovi =

Scientific classification
- Kingdom: Animalia
- Phylum: Mollusca
- Class: Gastropoda
- Subclass: Caenogastropoda
- Order: Neogastropoda
- Superfamily: Conoidea
- Family: Mangeliidae
- Genus: Obesotoma
- Species: O. starobogatovi

Binomial name
- Obesotoma starobogatovi Bogdanov, 1990

Species of gastropod

Obesotoma starobogatovi is a species of sea snail, a marine gastropod mollusk in the family Mangeliidae.

Gastropods.com considers this name a nomen nudum.

== Distribution ==
This marine species occurs in Arctic Russia.
