= Obesotoma pulcherrima =

Scientific classification
- Kingdom: Animalia
- Phylum: Mollusca
- Class: Gastropoda
- Subclass: Caenogastropoda
- Order: Neogastropoda
- Superfamily: Conoidea
- Family: Mangeliidae
- Genus: Obesotoma
- Species: O. pulcherrima

Binomial name
- Obesotoma pulcherrima Bogdanov & Ito, 1992

Species of gastropod

Obesotoma pulcherrima is a species of sea snail, a marine gastropod mollusk in the family Mangeliidae.

== Distribution ==
This species occurs in the Sea of Japan .
