= Obesotoma woodiana =

Scientific classification
- Kingdom: Animalia
- Phylum: Mollusca
- Class: Gastropoda
- Subclass: Caenogastropoda
- Order: Neogastropoda
- Superfamily: Conoidea
- Family: Mangeliidae
- Genus: Obesotoma
- Species: O. woodiana

Binomial name
- Obesotoma woodiana (Møller, 1842)

Synonyms
- Defrancia woodiana Moller, 1842

Species of gastropod

Obesotoma woodiana is a species of sea snail, a marine gastropod mollusk in the family Mangeliidae.

This species was named after William Wood, an English surgeon, zoologist and entomologist

== Description ==
The length of the shell varies between 12 mm and 17 mm.

== Distribution ==
This species occurs in European waters and in the Northwest Atlantic Ocean off Svalbard.
