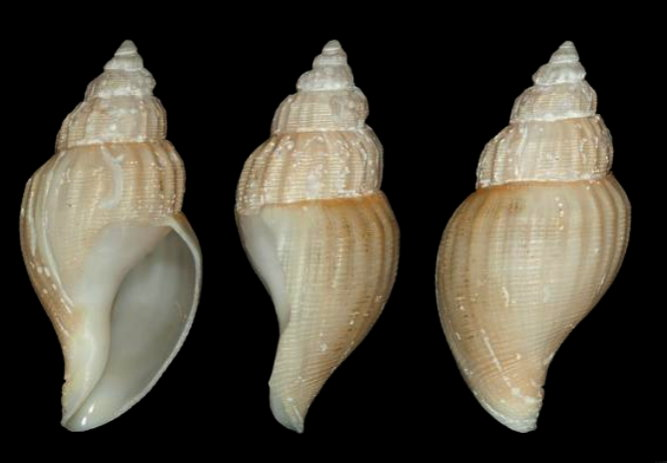
- Shell of Obesotoma tenuilirata (holotype at the Smithsonian Institution)

Scientific classification
- Kingdom: Animalia
- Phylum: Mollusca
- Class: Gastropoda
- Subclass: Caenogastropoda
- Order: Neogastropoda
- Superfamily: Conoidea
- Family: Mangeliidae
- Genus: Obesotoma
- Species: O. tenuilirata

Binomial name
- Obesotoma tenuilirata (Dall, 1871)

Synonyms
- Bela tenuilirata Dall, 1871; Lora tenuilirata (Dall, 1871); Obesotoma tenuilirata cymata Dall, 1919 (holotype)

= Obesotoma tenuilirata =

Species of gastropod

Obesotoma tenuilirata is a species of sea snail, a marine gastropod mollusk in the family Mangeliidae.

== Description ==
The length of the shell varies between 8 mm and 24 mm.

W.H. Dall considered this originally as perhaps a variety of Bela laevigata (synonym of synonym of Obesotoma laevigata (Dall, 1871)). It is pure white, with distinct revolving lines decussated by regular lines of growth. Only one specimen of this description was found, which is even more globular than the typical form, and has a deeper sinus and narrower aperture. It may be distinct.

== Distribution ==
This marine species occurs in the Sea of Japan, the Bering Sea and off Alaska (Point Barrow, Arctic Ocean, to the Shumagin Islands).
