= Obesotoma sachalinensis =

Scientific classification
- Kingdom: Animalia
- Phylum: Mollusca
- Class: Gastropoda
- Subclass: Caenogastropoda
- Order: Neogastropoda
- Superfamily: Conoidea
- Family: Mangeliidae
- Genus: Obesotoma
- Species: O. sachalinensis

Binomial name
- Obesotoma sachalinensis Bogdanov, 1989

Species of gastropod

Obesotoma sachalinensis is a species of sea snail, a marine gastropod mollusk in the family Mangeliidae.

== Description ==
The length of the shell varies between 16 mm and 21 mm.

== Distribution ==
This species occurs in the Sea of Okhotsk.
