= Obesotoma tumida =

Scientific classification
- Kingdom: Animalia
- Phylum: Mollusca
- Class: Gastropoda
- Subclass: Caenogastropoda
- Order: Neogastropoda
- Superfamily: Conoidea
- Family: Mangeliidae
- Genus: Obesotoma
- Species: O. tumida

Binomial name
- Obesotoma tumida (Posselt, 1898)

Synonyms
- Bela tumida Posselt, 1898

Species of gastropod

Obesotoma tumida is a species of sea snail, a marine gastropod mollusk in the family Mangeliidae.

== Description ==
The length of the shell varies between 10 mm and 13 mm.

== Distribution ==
This marine species occurs off Western Greenland; Eastern Siberia, and the Laptev Sea, Russia
