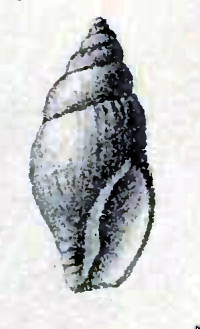
- Drawing of a shell of Obesotoma simplex

Scientific classification
- Kingdom: Animalia
- Phylum: Mollusca
- Class: Gastropoda
- Subclass: Caenogastropoda
- Order: Neogastropoda
- Superfamily: Conoidea
- Family: Mangeliidae
- Genus: Obesotoma
- Species: O. simplex

Binomial name
- Obesotoma simplex (Middendorf, 1849)

Synonyms
- Pleurotoma simplex Middendorf, 1849

= Obesotoma simplex =

Species of gastropod

Obesotoma simplex is a species of sea snail, a marine gastropod mollusk in the family Mangeliidae.

== Description ==
The length of the shell varies between 7 mm and 20 mm.

The shell is whitish or flesh-white, under a livid olivaceous epidermis. It is smooth, or with fine spiral striae. The aperture is violaceous to white.

== Distribution ==
This species occurs in European waters and in the Northwest Atlantic Ocean off Svalbard and in the Barents Sea; also in the Bering Strait and in the Sea of Okhotsk
