= Osmunda wehrii =

Osmunda wehrii Temporal range: Middle Miocene, 15.6 Ma

Scientific classification
- Kingdom: Plantae
- Clade: Tracheophytes
- Division: Polypodiophyta
- Class: Polypodiopsida
- Order: Osmundales
- Family: Osmundaceae
- Genus: Osmunda
- Species: †O. wehrii

Binomial name
- †Osmunda wehrii Miller, 1982

Extinct species of fern

Osmunda wehrii is an extinct species of fern in the modern genus Osmunda of the family Osmundaceae. Osmunda wehrii is known from Langhian age Miocene fossils found in Central Washington.

== History and classification ==
The species was described from specimens of silicified rhizomes and frond bases in blocks of chert. The cherts were recovered from sediments outcropping near the contact of the Roza Basalts and the overlying Priest Rapids Basalts, designated the type locality, near the town of Beverly, Washington by Fred Brinkman of Sunnyside, Washington. Further specimens of O. wehrii have been found at the "Ho ho" site, one of the "county line hole" fossil localities north of Interstate 82 in Yakima County, Washington. The "Ho ho" site works strata which is part of the Museum Flow Package within the interbeds of the Sentinel Bluffs Unit of the central Columbia Plateau N_{2} Grande Ronde Basalt, Columbia River Basalt Group. The Museum Flow Package interbeds are dated to the middle Miocene and are approximately 15.6 million years old.

The holotype specimens, two pieces of the same chert specimen containing rhizomes and frond bases, are preserved in the Burke Museum of Natural History and Culture as specimen numbers "4772" and "4773". The specimens of chert were studied by paleobotanists Charles N. Miller jr of University of Montana. Miller published his 1982 type description for Osmunda wehrii in the American Journal of Botany volume 69 article "Osmunda wehrii, a New Species Based on Petrified Rhizomes from the Miocene of Washington". In his type description he noted the etymology for the specific epithet wehrii, in honor of Wesley C. Wehr who made the type specimens available to Miller for study.

== Description ==
Wessiea possesses rhizomes which are approximately 4 centimetres (1.6 in) in diameter. The fossils have distinct stipular frond bases characteristic of the family Osmundaceae, while the interior of the fronds show distinct long fibers in the frond bases are both representative of the modern genus Osmunda. It is found in the chert blocks intertwined with the extinct genus Wessiea yakimaensis and anatomically preserved Woodwardia virginica, which still lives in the forests of eastern coastal North America.
