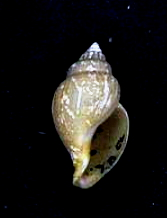
- Shell of Obesotoma gigantea

Scientific classification
- Kingdom: Animalia
- Phylum: Mollusca
- Class: Gastropoda
- Subclass: Caenogastropoda
- Order: Neogastropoda
- Superfamily: Conoidea
- Family: Mangeliidae
- Genus: Obesotoma; Bartsch, 1941

Type species
- Obesotoma japonica Bartsch, 1941

Species
- See text

= Obesotoma =

Genus of gastropods

Obesotoma is a genus of sea snails, marine gastropod mollusks in the family Mangeliidae.

== Species ==
Species within the genus Obesotoma include:

- Obesotoma cymata (Dall, 1919)
- Obesotoma gigantea (Mörch, 1869)
- Obesotoma gigas (Verkrüzen, 1875)
- Obesotoma hokkaidoensis (Bartsch, 1941)
- Obesotoma iessoensis (Smith E. A., 1875)
- Obesotoma japonica Bartsch, 1941
- Obesotoma laevigata (Dall, 1871)
- Obesotoma okutanii Bogdanov & Ito, 1992
- Obesotoma oyashio Shikama, 1962
- Obesotoma pulcherrima Bogdanov & Ito, 1992
- Obesotoma robusta (Packard, 1866)
- Obesotoma sachalinensis Bogdanov, 1989
- Obesotoma simplex (Middendorf, 1849)
- Obesotoma solida (Dall, 1887)
- Obesotoma starobogatovi Bogdanov, 1990
- Obesotoma tenuilirata (Dall, 1871)
- Obesotoma tomiyaensis (Otuka, 1949)
- Obesotoma tumida (Posselt, 1898)
- Obesotoma uchidai Habe, 1958
- Obesotoma woodiana (Møller, 1842)

Species brought into synonymy

- Obesotoma hanazakiensis Habe, 1958: synonym of Oenopota hanazakiensis (Habe, 1958)
- Obesotoma miona (Dall, W.H., 1919): synonym of Propebela miona (Dall, W.H., 1919)
- Obesotoma schantarica Middendorff, 1849: synonym of Oenopota schantaricum (Middendorf, 1849)
