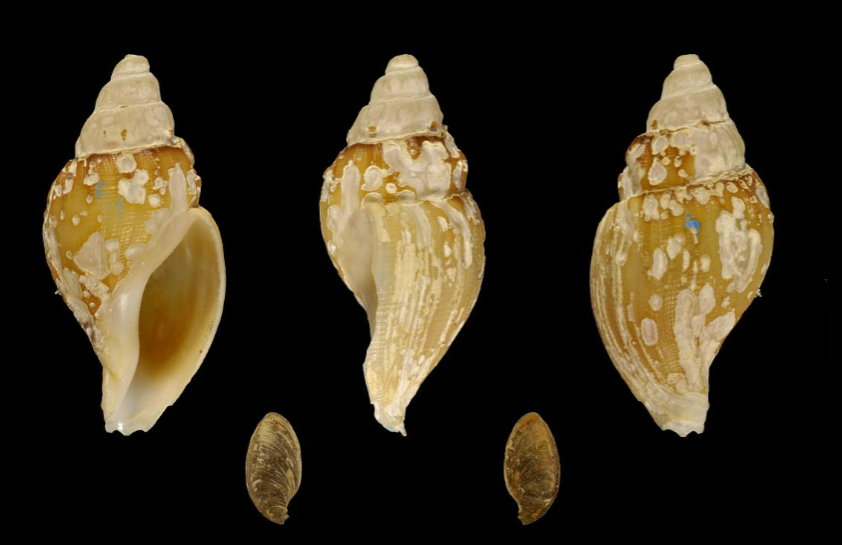
- Shell of Obesotoma japonica (holotype at the Smithsonian Institution)

Scientific classification
- Kingdom: Animalia
- Phylum: Mollusca
- Class: Gastropoda
- Subclass: Caenogastropoda
- Order: Neogastropoda
- Superfamily: Conoidea
- Family: Mangeliidae
- Genus: Obesotoma
- Species: O. japonica

Binomial name
- Obesotoma japonica Bartsch, 1941

= Obesotoma japonica =

Species of gastropod

Obesotoma japonica is a species of sea snail, a marine gastropod mollusk in the family Mangeliidae.

== Description ==
The length of the shell varies between 24 mm and 27 mm.

== Distribution ==
This species was found in the Sea of Japan off Hokkaido Island at a depth of 783 m.
