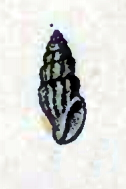
- Drawing of a shell of Obesotoma gigas

Scientific classification
- Kingdom: Animalia
- Phylum: Mollusca
- Class: Gastropoda
- Subclass: Caenogastropoda
- Order: Neogastropoda
- Superfamily: Conoidea
- Family: Mangeliidae
- Genus: Obesotoma
- Species: O. gigas

Binomial name
- Obesotoma gigas (Verkrüzen, 1875)

Synonyms
- Bela gigas (Verkrüzen, 1875); Pleurotoma gigas Verkrüzen, 1875

= Obesotoma gigas =

Species of gastropod

Obesotoma gigas is a species of sea snail, a marine gastropod mollusk in the family Mangeliidae.

== Description ==
The length of the shell attains 14 mm.

== Distribution ==
This species occurs off Svalbard and Arctic Russia.
