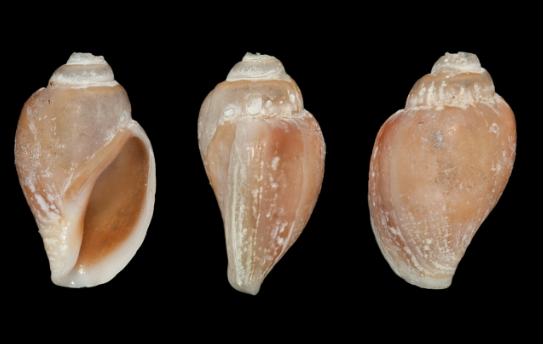
- Shell of Obesotoma laevigata (holotype at the Smithsonian Institution)

Scientific classification
- Kingdom: Animalia
- Phylum: Mollusca
- Class: Gastropoda
- Subclass: Caenogastropoda
- Order: Neogastropoda
- Superfamily: Conoidea
- Family: Mangeliidae
- Genus: Obesotoma
- Species: O. laevigata

Binomial name
- Obesotoma laevigata (Dall, 1871)

Synonyms
- Bela laevigata Dall, 1871; Oenopota simplex (Middendorff, 1849) (preoccupied name, synonym, currently in Obesotoma); Pleurotoma violacea var. moerchi Leche, 1878

= Obesotoma laevigata =

Species of sea snail in the family Mangeliidae

Obesotoma laevigata is a species of sea snail, a marine gastropod mollusk in the family Mangeliidae.

== Description ==
The length of the shell varies between 6 mm and 20 mm.

(Original description) The short, stout shell consists of four or five robust whorls. These are smooth, or with excessively fine revolving lines. The spire is short, usually one third or less of the total length, but varying somewhat. The suture is distinct but not channelled. The whorls are not turreted. The apex is rather obtuse. The protoconch is minute, whitish, smooth and consists of 1½ whorl . The wide aperture is about two-thirds as long as the shell. The outer lip is effuse. The sutural sinus is more or less marked. The wide siphonal canal is short and straight. The exterior is sometimes marked with rather rugged lines of growth, or is quite smooth, but not polished. The color of the shell is livid purple, with a superficial wash of white, a solid white line below the suture. The anterior extremity of the columella is white. The callus is evident but not conspicuous.

This very peculiar little shell is of a solid and rugged aspect, even living specimens looking as if beach-worn and dead. It varies in the roundness of the whorls and the elevation of the spire. Living specimens sometimes present no revolving lines, while others show excessively fine ones.

== Distribution ==
This marine species occurs off Greenland, Iceland and in the Western Mediterranean Sea.
