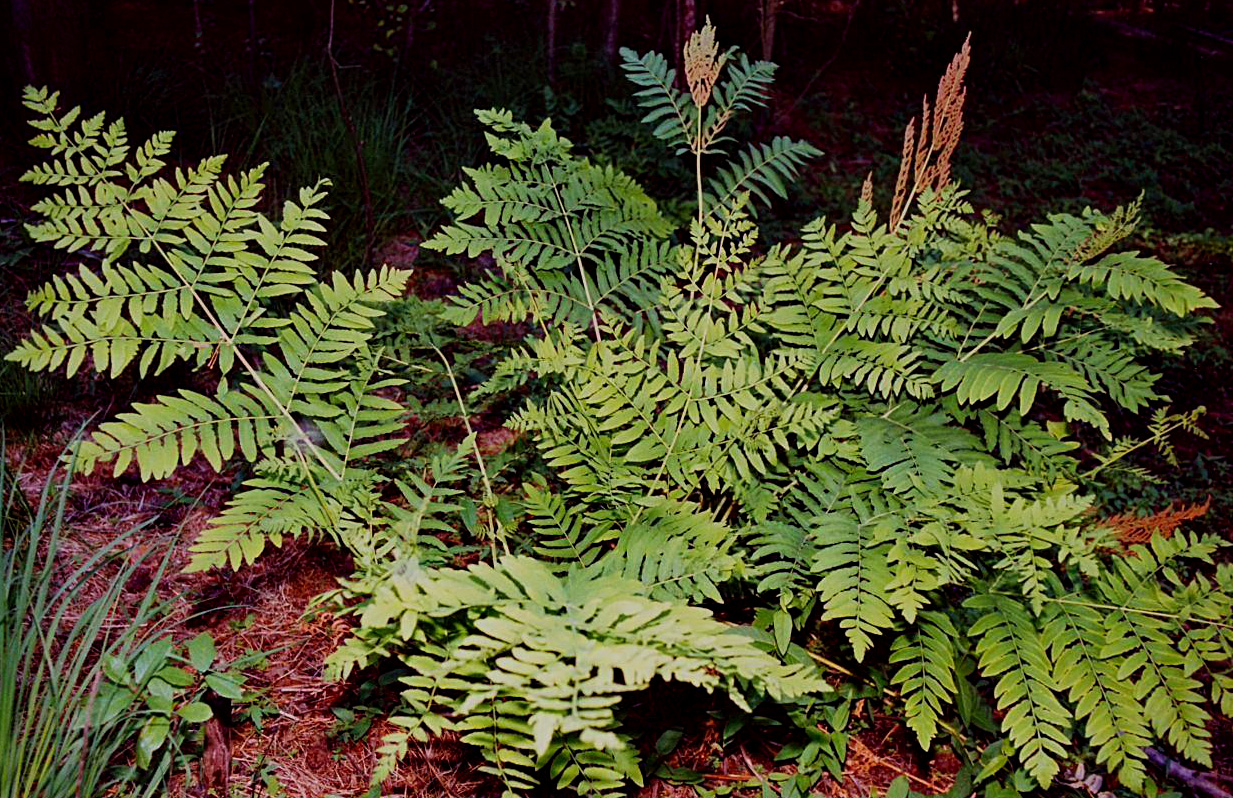
- Osmunda regalis

Scientific classification
- Kingdom: Plantae
- Clade: Tracheophytes
- Division: Polypodiophyta
- Class: Polypodiopsida
- Order: Osmundales
- Family: Osmundaceae
- Genus: Osmunda; L.

Type species
- Osmunda regalis L.

Species
- See text

Synonyms
- Aphyllocalpa Lagasca, Garcia & Clemente; Struthiopteris Bernhardi

= Osmunda =

Osmunda Temporal range: Valanginian–recent

Genus of ferns

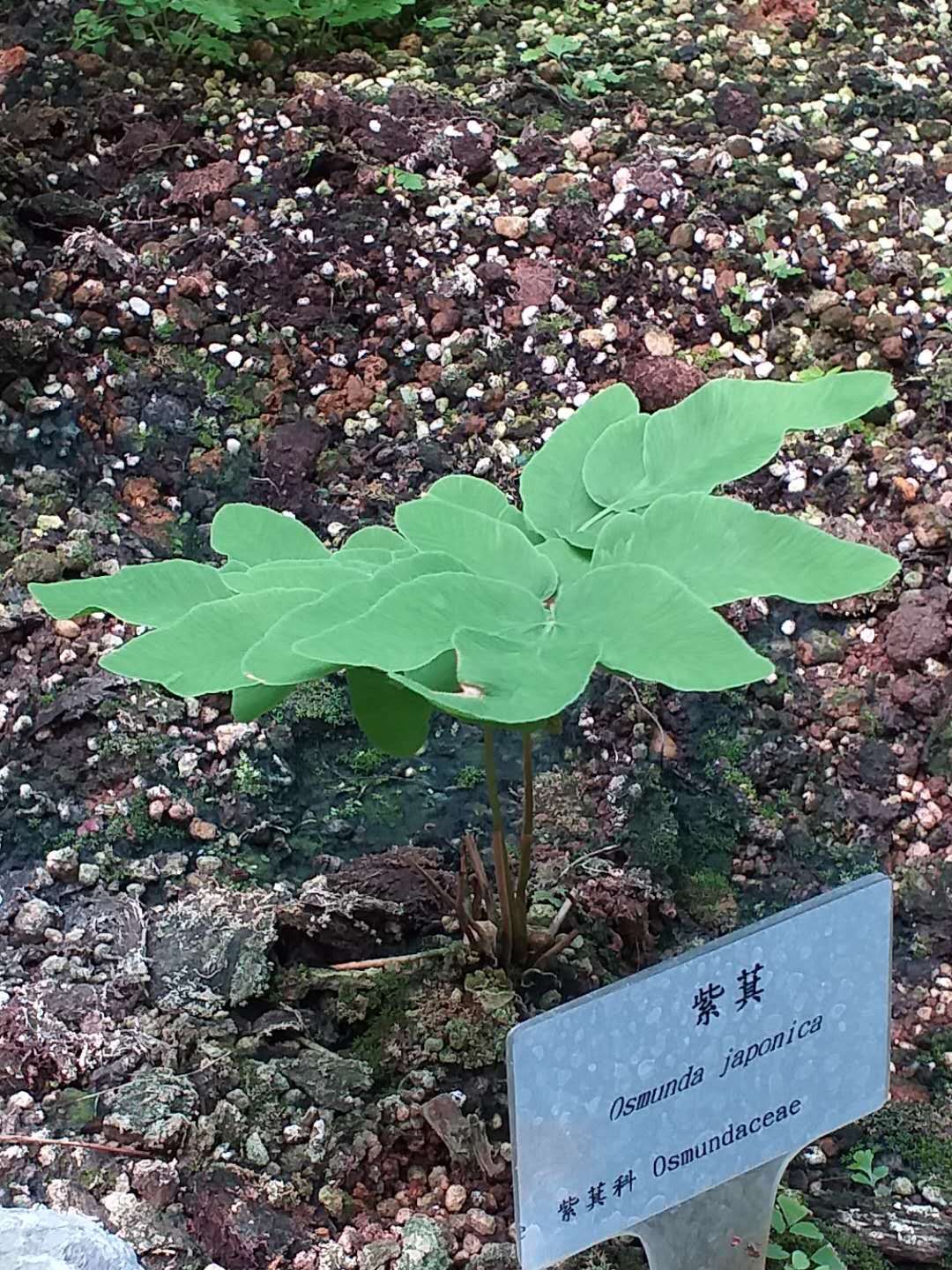
Young plant

Osmunda is a genus of primarily temperate-zone ferns of family Osmundaceae. Five to ten species have been listed for this genus. They have existed since the Early Cretaceous.

== Description ==
Completely dimorphic fronds or pinnae (hemidimorphic), green photosynthetic sterile fronds, and non-photosynthetic spore-bearing fertile pinnae, with large, naked sporangia. Because of the large mass of sporangia that ripen uniformly at the same time to a showy golden color, the ferns look as if they are in flower, and so this genus is sometimes called the "flowering ferns".

== Taxonomy ==
Osmunda, the type genus of the fern order Osmundales, has historically been the largest genus in the family Osmundaceae. Smith et al. (2006), who carried out the first higher-level pteridophyte classification published in the molecular phylogenetic era, described three genera in that family, namely Osmunda, Leptopteris, and Todea. The genus has also been treated historically as consisting of a number of subgroups, generally subgenera, Osmunda (3 species), Osmundastrum (2 species), and Plenasium (3–4 species). However, there was suspicion that the genus was not monophyletic.

The publication of a detailed phylogeny of the family by Metzgar et al. in 2008 showed that Osmunda as circumscribed was paraphyletic and that Osmunda cinnamomea, despite its morphological similarity to Osmunda claytoniana, was sister to the rest of the family, and resurrected the segregate genus Osmundastrum, by elevating it from subgenus, to contain it and render Osmunda monophyletic. The phylogeny of Osmunda is shown in the following cladograms.

External phylogeny

- Osmundaceae
  - Osmundastrum 1 species
  - - - Todea 2 species
      - Leptopteris 6 species
    - Osmunda
      - subgenus Claytosmunda 1 species
      - - subgenus Plenasium 4 species
        - subgenus Osmunda 4 species

Internal phylogeny

- Osmunda
  - - O. hybrida
    - O. regalis
  - - O. spectabilis
    - - O. japonica
      - O. lancea

A number of authors have proposed elevating the subgenera to separate genus level, In 2016 the Pteridophyte Phylogeny Group (PPG) classification split Osmunda further by elevating its subgenera to genera as Claytosmunda and Plenasium, leaving only the species originally included in subgenus Osmunda.

- O. abyssinica (Kuhn 1879) Bobrov
- O. acuta (Burm.fil. 1768) Fraser-Jenk.
- †O. chengii Bomfleur, Grimm & McLoughlin [Osmunda claytoniites Phipps, Taylor & Taylor non Graham 1963]
- O. herbacea Copeland
- O. hybrida Tsutsumi et al.
- O. × intermedia {O. lancea × O. japonica}
- O. japonica Thunberg (Japanese flowering fern)
- O. lancea Thunberg (Japanese lancea flowering fern)
- O. x mildei {O. angustifolia × O. japonica}
- O. piresii Brade 1965
- O. regalis L. (Old World royal fern)
- O. × ruggii {O. claytoniana × O. spectabilis}
- O. spectabilis Willdenow (American royal fern)
- †O. wehrii Miller (Middle Miocene, Washington state)

=== Etymology ===
The derivation of the genus name is uncertain. A common theory is that Osmunda derives from Osmunder, a Saxon name for the god Thor. Other explanations propose that it is from Middle English and Middle French words for a type of fern, or mention an English folk tale of a boatman named Osmund hiding his wife and children in a patch of royal fern during the Danish invasion.

== Ecology ==
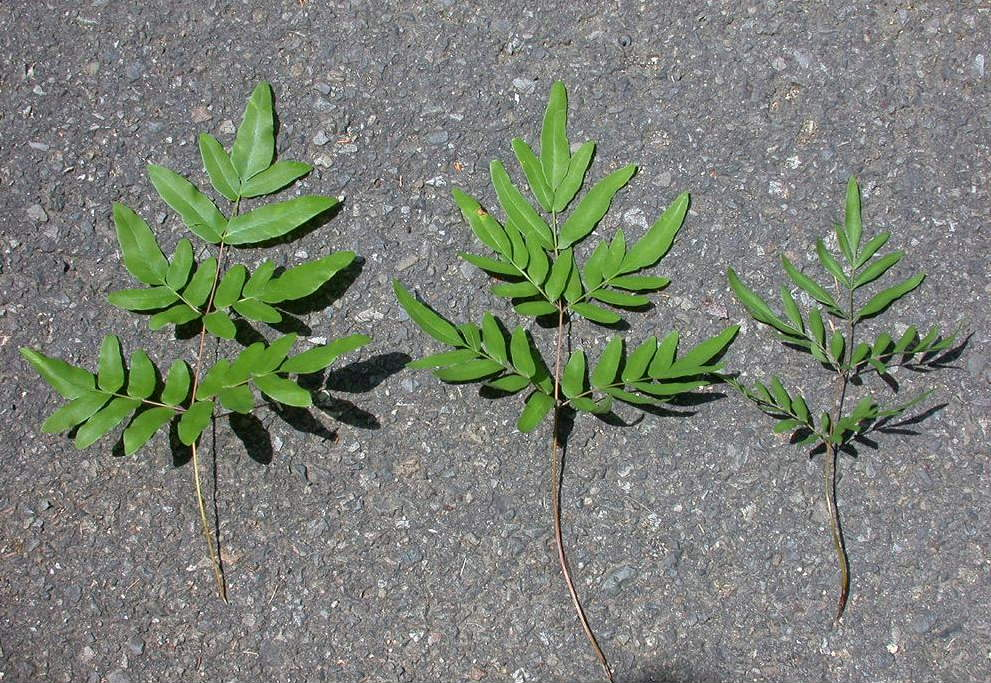
O. japonica, O. × intermedia, and O. lancea

Osmunda species are used as food plants by the larvae of some Lepidoptera species including the engrailed.

One of the species, the cinnamon fern (Osmundastrum cinnamomeum) forms huge clonal colonies in swamp areas. These ferns form massive rootstocks with densely matted, wiry roots. This root mass is an excellent substrate for many epiphytal plants. They are often harvested as osmundine and used horticulturally, especially in propagating and growing orchids.

== Bibliography ==
- Chase, Mark W.; Reveal, James L. (2009). "A phylogenetic classification of the land plants to accompany APG III". Botanical Journal of the Linnean Society. 161 (2): 122–127. doi:10.1111/j.1095-8339.2009.01002.x.
- Christenhusz, M. J. M.; Zhang, X. C.; Schneider, H. (18 February 2011). "A linear sequence of extant families and genera of lycophytes and ferns". Phytotaxa. 19 (1): 7. Bibcode:2011Phytx..19....7C. doi:10.11646/phytotaxa.19.1.2. hdl:10138/28042.
- Christenhusz, Maarten J.M.; Chase, Mark W. (2014). "Trends and concepts in fern classification". Annals of Botany. 113 (4): 571–594. doi:10.1093/aob/mct299. PMC 3936591. PMID 24532607.
- Christenhusz, Maarten JM & Byng, J. W. (2016). "The number of known plants species in the world and its annual increase". Phytotaxa. 261 (3): 201–217. Bibcode:2016Phytx.261..201C. doi:10.11646/phytotaxa.261.3.1.
- Lehtonen, Samuli (2011). "Towards Resolving the Complete Fern Tree of Life". PLoS ONE. 6 (10) e24851. Bibcode:2011PLoSO...624851L. doi:10.1371/journal.pone.0024851. PMC 3192703. PMID 22022365.
- Metzgar, Jordan S.; Skog, Judith E.; Zimmer, Elizabeth A.; Pryer, Kathleen M. (1 March 2008). "The Paraphyly of Osmunda is Confirmed by Phylogenetic Analyses of Seven Plastid Loci". Systematic Botany. 33 (1): 31–36. Bibcode:2008SysBo..33...31M. doi:10.1600/036364408783887528. S2CID 6180706.
- Pryer, Kathleen M.; Schneider, Harald; Smith, Alan R.; Cranfill, Raymond; Wolf, Paul G.; Hunt, Jeffrey S.; Sipes, Sedonia D. (2001). "Horsetails and ferns are a monophyletic group and the closest living relatives to seed plants". Nature. 409 (6820): 618–622. Bibcode:2001Natur.409..618S. doi:10.1038/35054555. PMID 11214320. S2CID 4367248.
- Pteridophyte Phylogeny Group (November 2016). "A community-derived classification for extant lycophytes and ferns". Journal of Systematics and Evolution. 54 (6): 563–603. Bibcode:2016JSyEv..54..563.. doi:10.1111/jse.12229. S2CID 39980610.
- Ranker, Tom A.; Haufler, Christopher H., eds. (2008). Biology and Evolution of Ferns and Lycophytes. Cambridge University Press. ISBN 978-0-521-87411-3.
- Schneider, Harald; Smith, Alan R.; Pryer, Kathleen M. (1 July 2009). "Is Morphology Really at Odds with Molecules in Estimating Fern Phylogeny?". Systematic Botany. 34 (3): 455–475. Bibcode:2009SysBo..34..455S. doi:10.1600/036364409789271209. S2CID 85855934.
- Smith, Alan R.; Kathleen M. Pryer; Eric Schuettpelz; Petra Korall; Harald Schneider; Paul G. Wolf (2006). "A classification for extant ferns" (PDF). Taxon. 55 (3): 705–731. Bibcode:2006Taxon..55..705S. doi:10.2307/25065646. JSTOR 25065646.
- Smith, Alan R.; Pryer, Kathleen M.; Schuettpelz, Eric; Korall, Petra; Schneider, Harald; Wolf, Paul G. (24 April 2022). Fern classification (PDF). pp. 417–467., in Ranker & Haufler (2008)
- Phipps, C.J., Taylor, T.N., Taylor, E.L., Cuneo, N.R., Boucher, L.D., and Yao, X. (1998). Osmunda (Osmundaceae) from the Triassic of Antarctica: An example of evolutionary stasis. American Journal of Botany 85: 888-895
