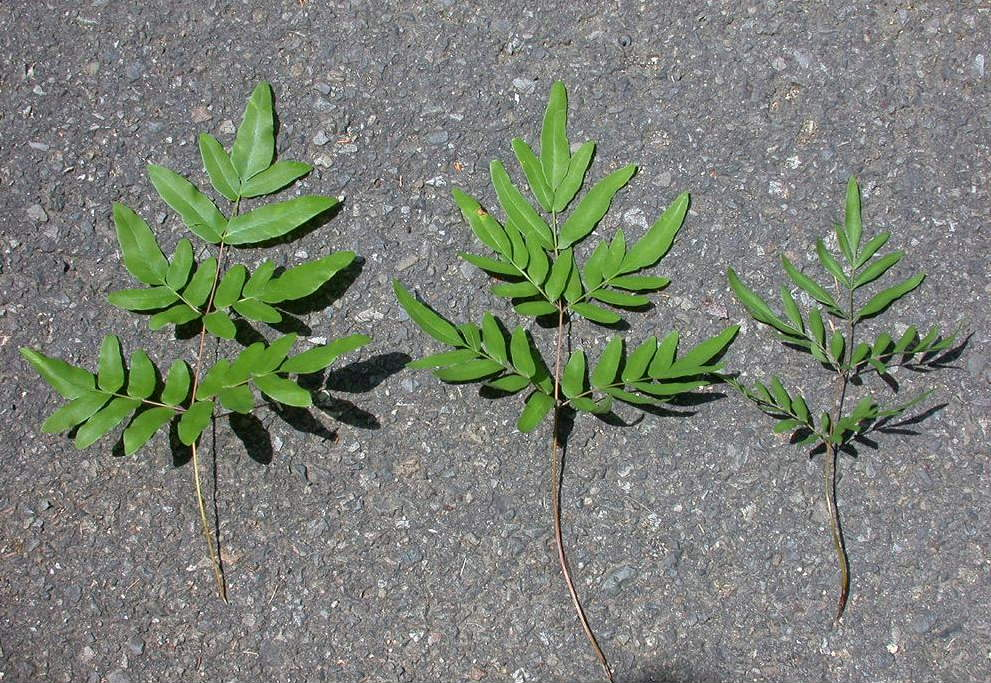
- Osmunda lancea on the right

Scientific classification
- Kingdom: Plantae
- Clade: Tracheophytes
- Division: Polypodiophyta
- Class: Polypodiopsida
- Order: Osmundales
- Family: Osmundaceae
- Genus: Osmunda
- Species: O. lancea

Binomial name
- Osmunda lancea Thunb

= Osmunda lancea =

Osmunda lancea Japanese lancea flowering fern

Species of fern

Osmunda lancea is a fern in the genus Osmunda, section Euosmunda. It is found in Japan.

It often hybridizes with Osmunda japonica to produce O. × intermedia.
