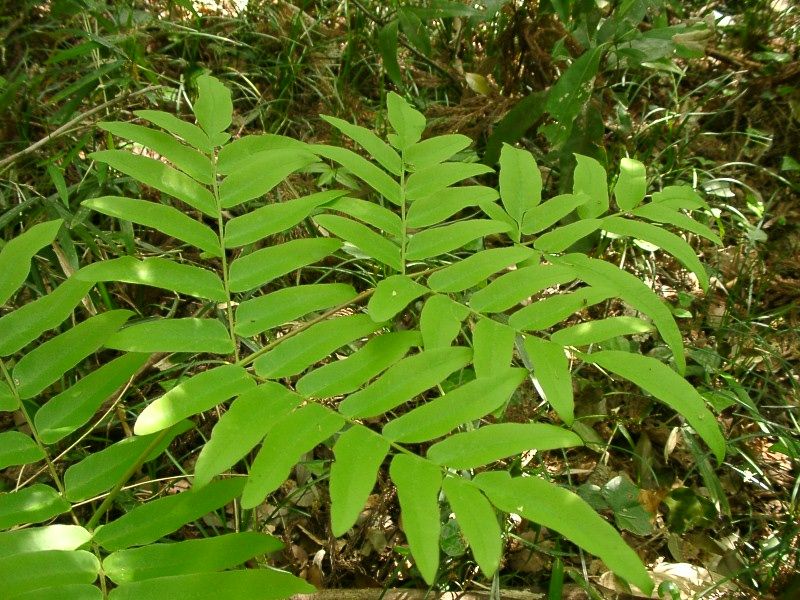
- Sterile frond

Scientific classification
- Kingdom: Plantae
- Clade: Tracheophytes
- Division: Polypodiophyta
- Class: Polypodiopsida
- Order: Osmundales
- Family: Osmundaceae
- Genus: Osmunda
- Species: O. japonica

Binomial name
- Osmunda japonica Thunb.

= Osmunda japonica =

Species of fern

Osmunda japonica (syn. Osmunda nipponica Makino), also called Asian royal fern or fiddlehead, is a fern in the genus Osmunda native to east Asia, including Japan, China, Korea, Taiwan, and the far east of Russia on the island of Sakhalin. It is called gobi (고비) in Korean, zenmai (ゼンマイ; 薇) in Japanese, and zǐqí or juécài (紫萁 or 蕨菜) in Chinese.

It is a deciduous herbaceous plant which produces separate fertile and sterile fronds. The sterile fronds are spreading, up to 80–100 cm tall, bipinnate, with pinnae 20–30 cm long and pinnules 4–6 cm long and 1.5–2 cm broad; the fertile fronds are erect and shorter, 20–50 cm tall.

It grows in moist woodlands and can tolerate open sunlight only if in very wet soil. Like other ferns, it has no flowers, but rather elaborate sporangia, that very superficially might suggest a flower, from which the alternative name derives.

Like its relative Osmundastrum cinnamomeum ("cinnamon fern"), the fertile fronds become brown-colored and contain spores. The sterile (vegetative) fronds resemble those of Osmunda regalis ("royal fern"), another relative of O. japonica.

In some parts of China, Tibet, and Japan, the young fronds or fiddleheads of O. japonica are used as a vegetable. In Korea too, these young shoots are commonly used to make dishes like namul.

O. japonica has also been shown to improve indoor air quality by significantly reducing of air toxins, specifically formaldehydes.

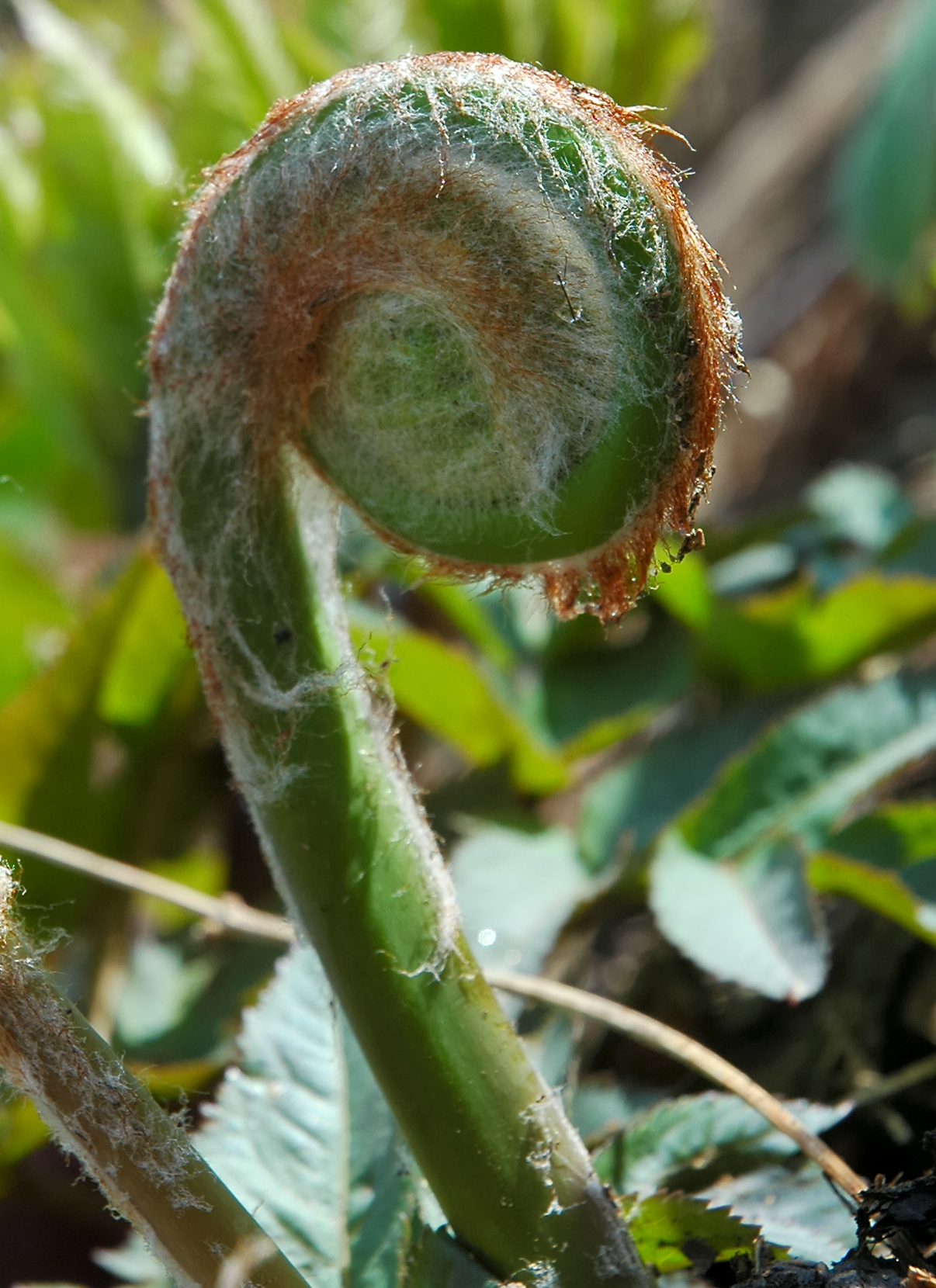
Young frond in spring

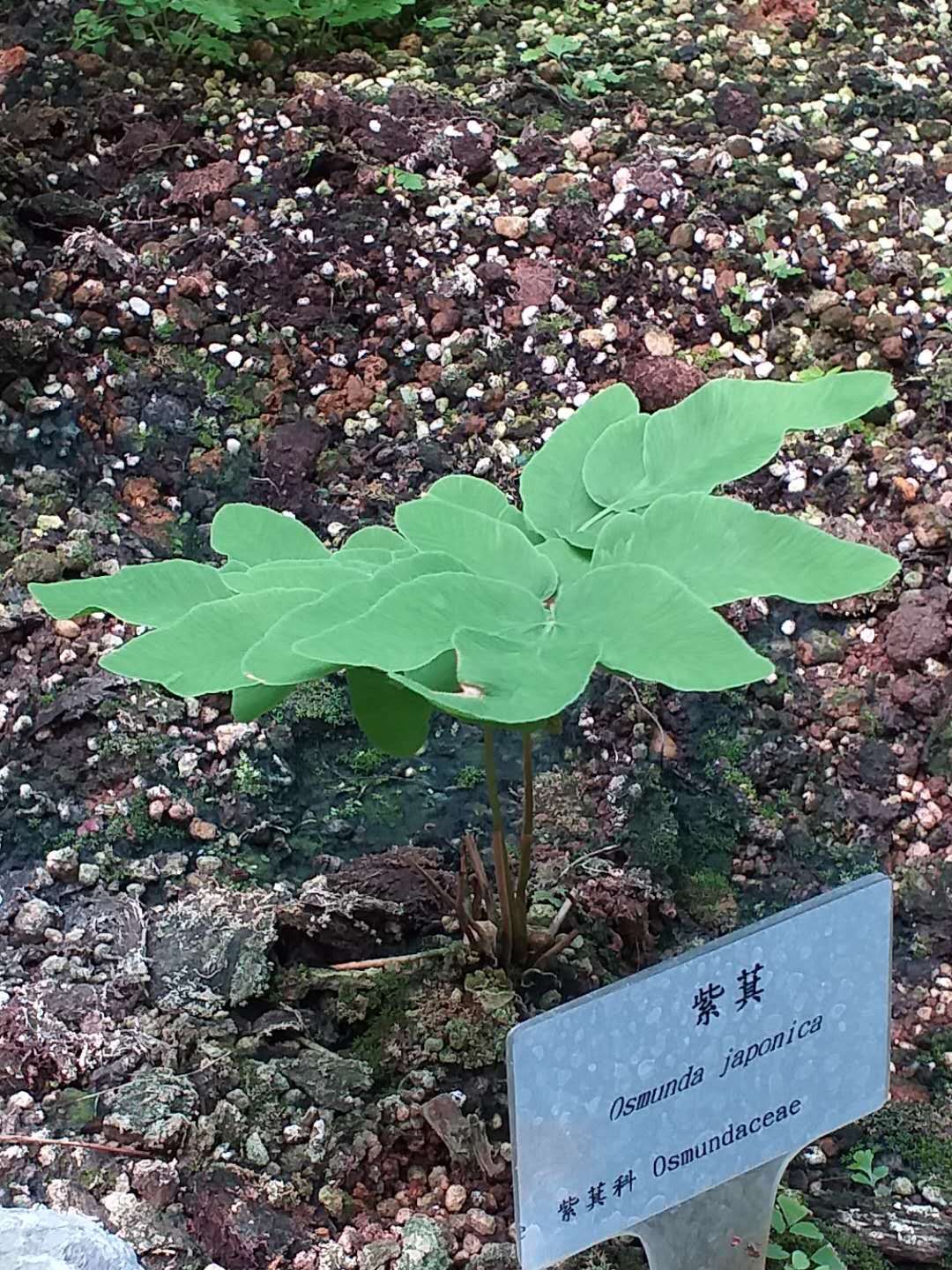
Young plant
