= Rheophyte =

Plant adapted to flowing water

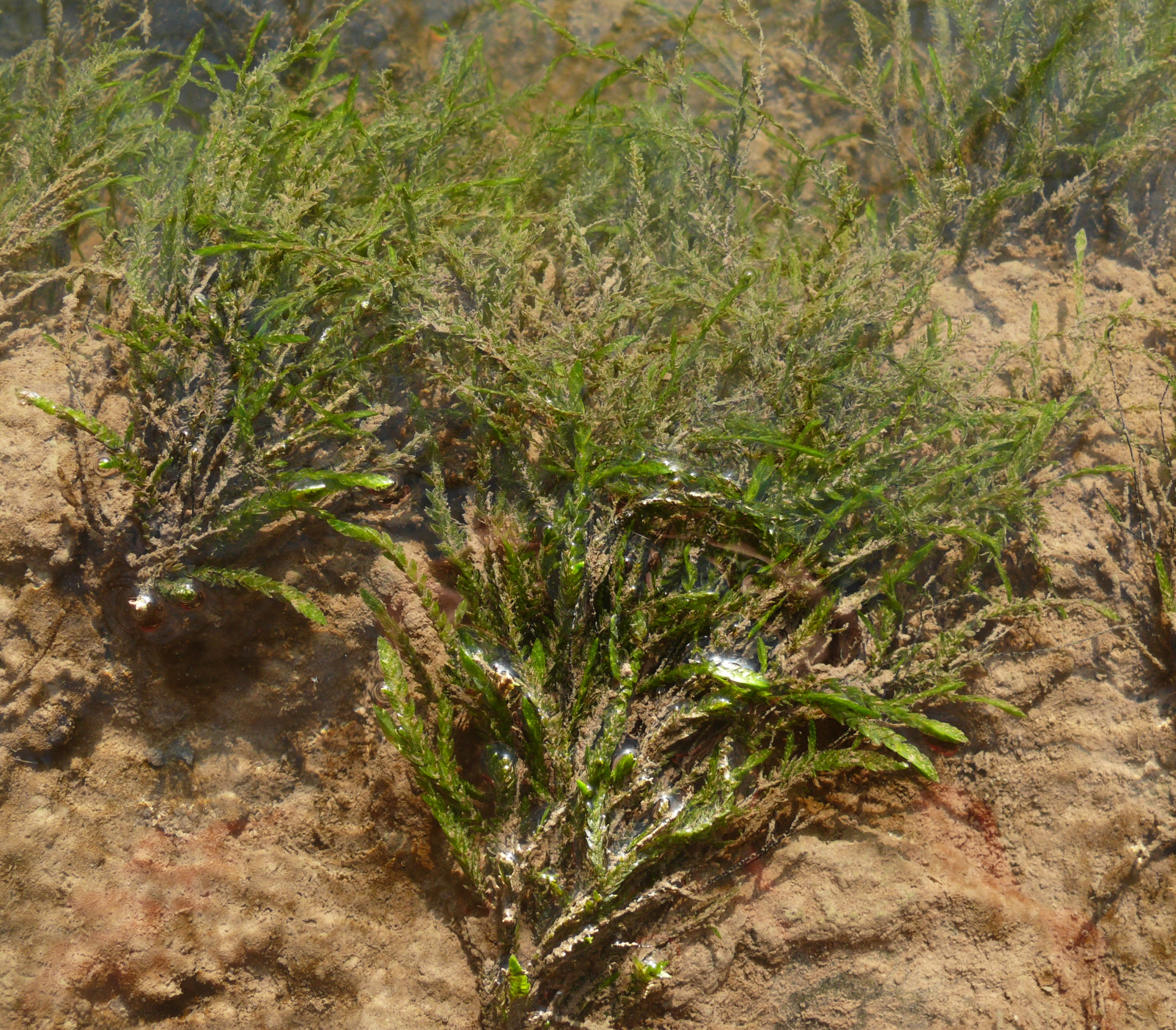
Fontinalis antipyretica, Hohenlohe, Germany

A rheophyte is a plant that lives in fast moving water currents in an environment where few other organisms can survive. Rheophytes tend to be found in currents that move at rates of one to two meters per second and that are up to 1 to 2 m deep. The amount of force produced by these currents, and the damaging debris they can carry, makes this environment inhospitable to most plants. Rheophytes are able to live in such environments because their leaves are streamlined so as put up little resistance to the flow of water. The leaves tend to be quite narrow and flexible as well. Simply being an aquatic plant with narrow leaves is not a sufficient condition for being a rheophyte. In order to prevent being uprooted by the rushing currents, rheophytes have an extremely strong wide spreading root system.

Rheophytes comprise two main groups - obligate rheophytes (or 'true' rheophytes) and facultative rheophytes. Apart from being adapted for fast currents, the survival of obligate rheophytes are dependent on the oxygenated water brought along with fast currents for survival. Facultative rheophytes are just as adapted to survive in areas where fast currents run through, but are not dependent on these fast currents to survival.

When low water levels occur, obligate rheophytes often quickly begin to flower to take advantage of these occurrences.

Examples of rheophytic plants are Asplenium obtusifolium, Osmunda lancea, and Tectaria lobbii (ferns) and Gosong brevipedunculata (an aroid). Aiphanes argos is a rheophytic palm.
