= Fossil =

Preserved remains or traces of organisms from a past geological age

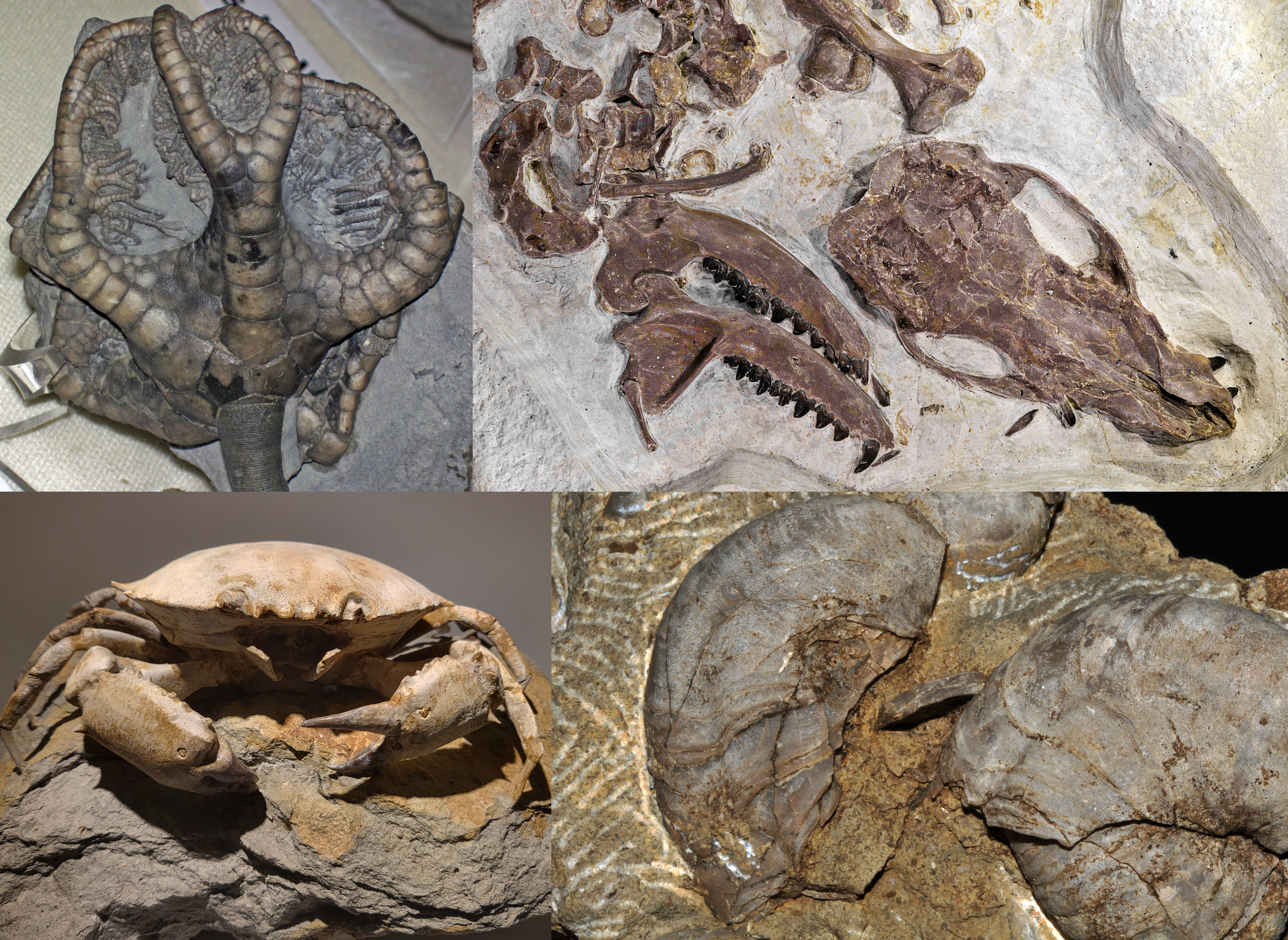
Examples of animal fossils. Clockwise from top left: Onychocrinus, Palaeosinopa, Gryphaea, and Harpactocarcinus

A fossil (from Classical Latin fossilis, lit. 'obtained by digging') is any preserved remains, impression, or trace of any once-living thing from a past geological age. Examples include bones, shells, exoskeletons, stone imprints of animals or microbes, objects preserved in amber, hair, petrified wood and DNA remnants. The totality of fossils is known as the fossil record. Though the fossil record is incomplete, numerous studies have demonstrated that there is enough information available to give a good understanding of the pattern of diversification of life on Earth, and it can fill gaps in our understanding of the sequence of evolution on earth.

Paleontology includes the study of fossils: their age, method of formation, and evolutionary significance. Specimens are sometimes considered to be fossils if they are over 10,000 years old. The oldest fossils are around 3.48 billion years to 4.1 billion years old. The observation in the 19th century that certain fossils were associated with certain rock strata led to the recognition of a geological timescale and the relative ages of different fossils. The development of radiometric dating techniques in the early 20th century allowed scientists to quantitatively measure the absolute ages of rocks and the fossils they host.

There are many processes that lead to fossilization, including permineralization, casts and molds, authigenic mineralization, replacement and recrystallization, adpression, carbonization, and bioimmuration.

Fossils vary in size from one-micrometre (1 μm) bacteria to dinosaurs and trees, many meters long and weighing many tons. The largest presently known is a Sequoia sp. measuring 88 m (289 ft) in length at Coaldale, Nevada. A fossil normally preserves only a portion of the deceased organism, usually that portion that was partially mineralized during life, such as the bones and teeth of vertebrates, or the chitinous or calcareous exoskeletons of invertebrates. Fossils may also consist of the marks left behind by the organism while it was alive, such as animal tracks or feces (coprolites). These types of fossil are called trace fossils or ichnofossils, as opposed to body fossils. Some fossils are biochemical and are called chemofossils or biosignatures.

== History of study ==
Gathering fossils dates at least to the beginning of recorded history. The fossils themselves are referred to as the fossil record. The fossil record was one of the early sources of data underlying the study of evolution and continues to be relevant to the history of life on Earth. Paleontologists examine the fossil record to understand the process of evolution and the way particular species have evolved.

=== Ancient civilizations ===
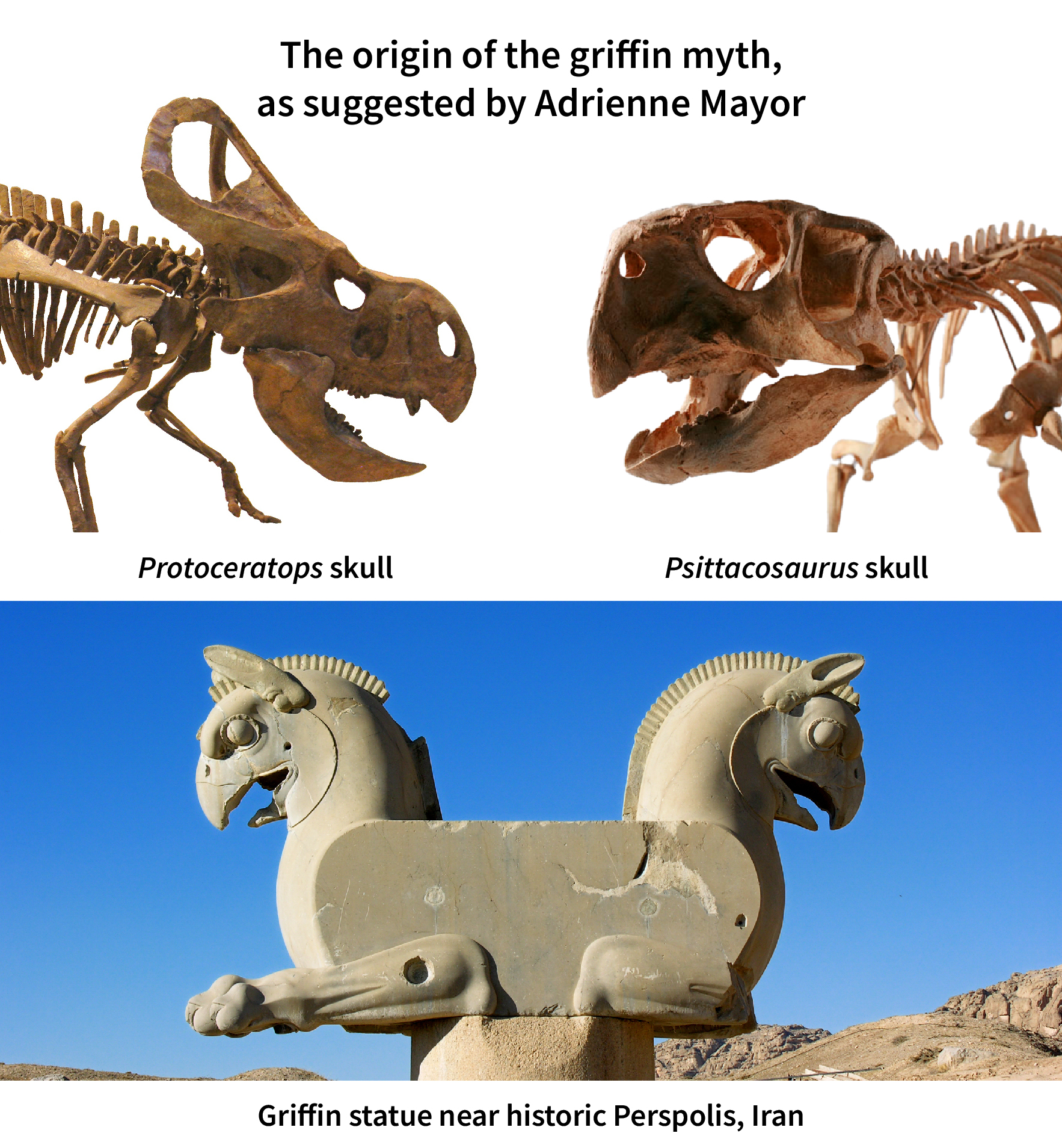
Ceratopsian skulls are common in the Dzungarian Gate mountain pass in Asia, an area once famous for gold mines and cold winds. This has been attributed to legends of both gryphons and the land of Hyperborea.

Fossils have been visible and common throughout most of natural history, and so documented human interaction with them goes back as far as recorded history, or earlier.

There are many examples of Paleolithic stone knives in Europe, with fossil echinoderms set precisely at the hand grip, dating back to Homo heidelbergensis and Neanderthals. These ancient peoples also drilled holes through the center of those round fossil shells, apparently using them as beads for necklaces.

The ancient Egyptians gathered fossils of species that resembled the bones of modern species they worshipped. The god Set was associated with the hippopotamus, therefore fossilized bones of hippo-like species were kept in that deity's temples. Five-rayed fossil sea urchin shells were associated with the deity Sopdu, the Morning Star, equivalent of Venus in Roman mythology.

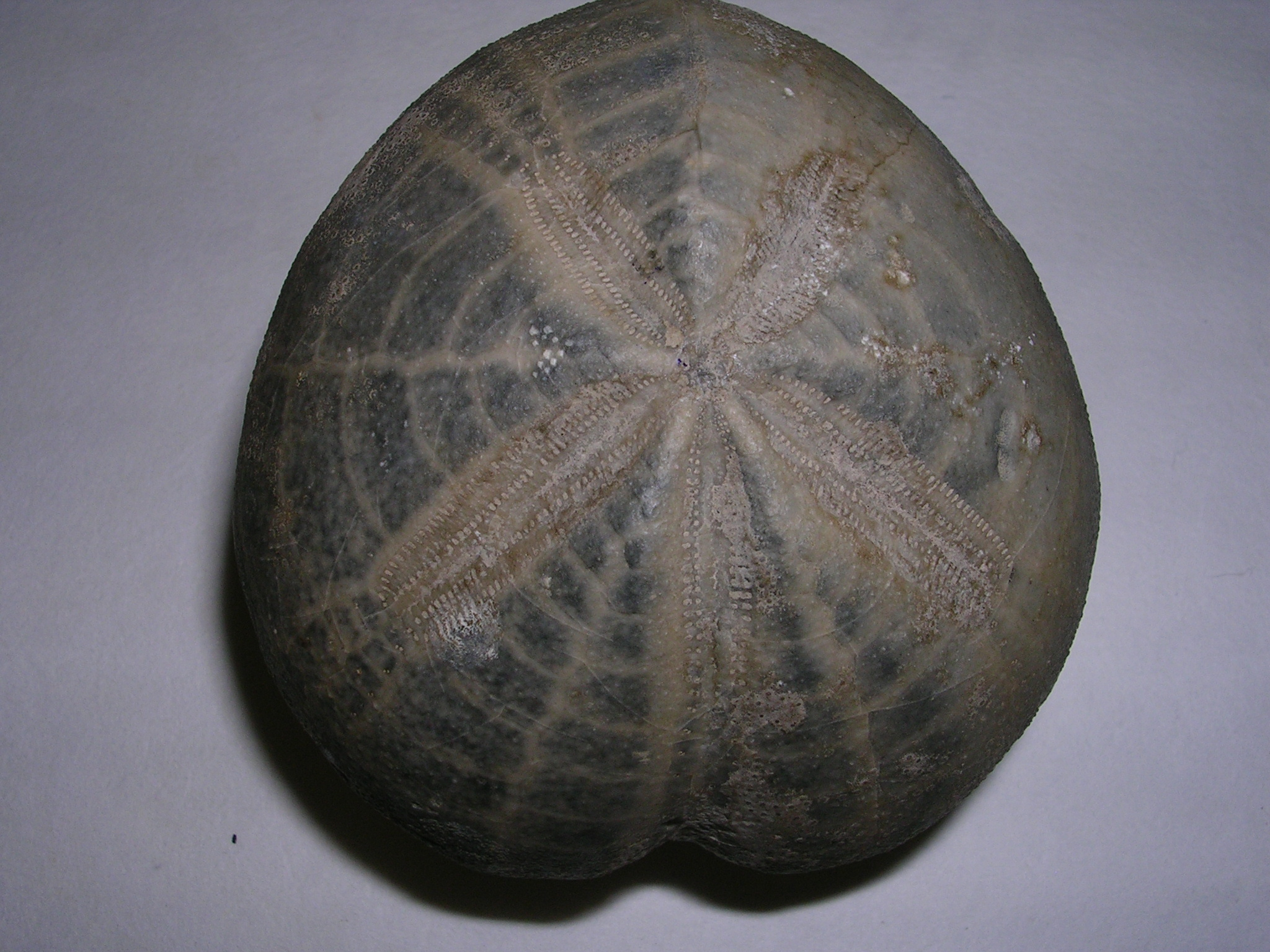
Fossil shells from the cretaceous era sea urchin, Micraster, were used in medieval times as both shepherd's crowns to protect houses, and as painted fairy loaves by bakers to bring luck to their bread-making.

Fossils appear to have directly contributed to the mythology of many civilizations, including the ancient Greeks. Adrienne Mayor suggests that Protoceratops skulls inspired legends about the griffin; this hypothesis has been contested by paleontologists like Mark P. Witton and Richard Hing.

In his treatise On Stones, Theophrastus of Eresus speaks of the fossilized remains of organic life. A previous Greek scholar, Aristotle, eventually realized that fossil seashells from rocks were similar to those found on the beach, indicating the fossils were once living animals. He had previously explained them in terms of vaporous exhalations, which Persian polymath Avicenna modified into the theory of petrifying fluids (succus lapidificatus). Recognition of fossil seashells as originating in the sea was built upon in the 14th century by Albert of Saxony, and accepted in some form by most naturalists by the 16th century.

Roman naturalist Pliny the Elder wrote of "tongue stones", which he called glossopetra. These were fossil shark teeth, thought by some classical cultures to look like the tongues of people or snakes. He also wrote about the horns of Ammon, which are fossil ammonites, whence the group of shelled octopus-cousins ultimately draws its modern name. Pliny also makes one of the earlier known references to toadstones, thought until the 18th century to be a magical cure for poison originating in the heads of toads, but which are fossil teeth from Lepidotes, a Cretaceous ray-finned fish.

The Plains tribes of North America are thought to have similarly associated fossils, such as the many intact pterosaur fossils naturally exposed in the region, with their own mythology of the thunderbird.

There is no such direct mythological connection known from prehistoric Africa, but there is considerable evidence of tribes there excavating and moving fossils to ceremonial sites, apparently treating them with some reverence.

In Japan, fossil shark teeth were associated with the mythical tengu, thought to be the razor-sharp claws of the creature, documented some time after the 8th century AD.

In medieval China, the fossil bones of ancient mammals including Homo erectus were often mistaken for "dragon bones" and used as medicine and aphrodisiacs. In addition, some of these fossil bones are collected as "art" by scholars, who left scripts on various artifacts, indicating the time they were added to a collection. One good example is the famous scholar Huang Tingjian of the Song dynasty during the 11th century, who kept a specific seashell fossil with his own poem engraved on it. In his Dream Pool Essays published in 1088, Song dynasty Chinese scholar-official Shen Kuo hypothesized that marine fossils found in a geological stratum of mountains located hundreds of miles from the Pacific Ocean was evidence that a prehistoric seashore had once existed there and shifted over centuries of time. His observation of petrified bamboos in the dry northern climate zone of what is now Yan'an, Shaanxi province, China, led him to advance early ideas of gradual climate change due to bamboo naturally growing in wetter climate areas.

In medieval Christendom, fossilized sea creatures on mountainsides were seen as proof of the biblical deluge of Noah's Ark. After observing the existence of seashells in mountains, the ancient Greek philosopher Xenophanes (c. 570 – 478 BC) speculated that the world was once inundated in a great flood that buried living creatures in drying mud.

In 1027, the Persian Avicenna explained fossils' stoniness in The Book of Healing:

If what is said concerning the petrifaction of animals and plants is true, the cause of this (phenomenon) is a powerful mineralizing and petrifying virtue which arises in certain stony spots, or emanates suddenly from the earth during earthquake and subsidences, and petrifies whatever comes into contact with it. As a matter of fact, the petrifaction of the bodies of plants and animals is not more extraordinary than the transformation of waters.

From the 1300s to the present day, scholars pointed out that the fossil skulls of Deinotherium giganteum, found in Crete and Greece, might have been interpreted as being the skulls of the Cyclopes of Greek mythology, and are possibly the origin of that Greek myth. Their skulls appear to have a single eye-hole in the front, just like their modern elephant cousins, though in fact it's actually the opening for their trunk.

In Norse mythology, echinoderm shells (the round five-part button left over from a sea urchin) were associated with the god Thor, not only being incorporated in thunderstones, representations of Thor's hammer and subsequent hammer-shaped crosses as Christianity was adopted, but also kept in houses to garner Thor's protection.

These grew into the shepherd's crowns of English folklore, used for decoration and as good luck charms, placed by the doorway of homes and churches. In Suffolk, a different species was used as a good-luck charm by bakers, who referred to them as fairy loaves, associating them with the similarly shaped loaves of bread they baked.

=== Early modern explanations ===
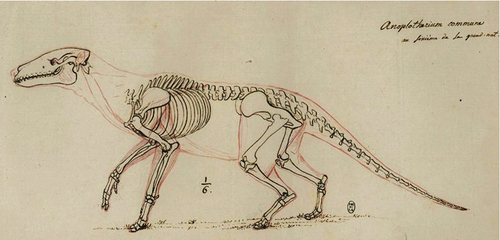
Georges Cuvier's 1812 skeletal reconstruction of Anoplotherium commune based on fossil remains of the extinct artiodactyl from Montmartre in Paris, France

More scientific views of fossils emerged during the Renaissance. Leonardo da Vinci concurred with Aristotle's view that fossils were the remains of ancient life. For example, Leonardo noticed discrepancies with the biblical flood narrative as an explanation for fossil origins:

If the Deluge had carried the shells for distances of three and four hundred miles from the sea it would have carried them mixed with various other natural objects all heaped up together; but even at such distances from the sea we see the oysters all together and also the shellfish and the cuttlefish and all the other shells which congregate together, found all together dead; and the solitary shells are found apart from one another as we see them every day on the sea-shores.

And we find oysters together in very large families, among which some may be seen with their shells still joined together, indicating that they were left there by the sea and that they were still living when the strait of Gibraltar was cut through. In the mountains of Parma and Piacenza multitudes of shells and corals with holes may be seen still sticking to the rocks....

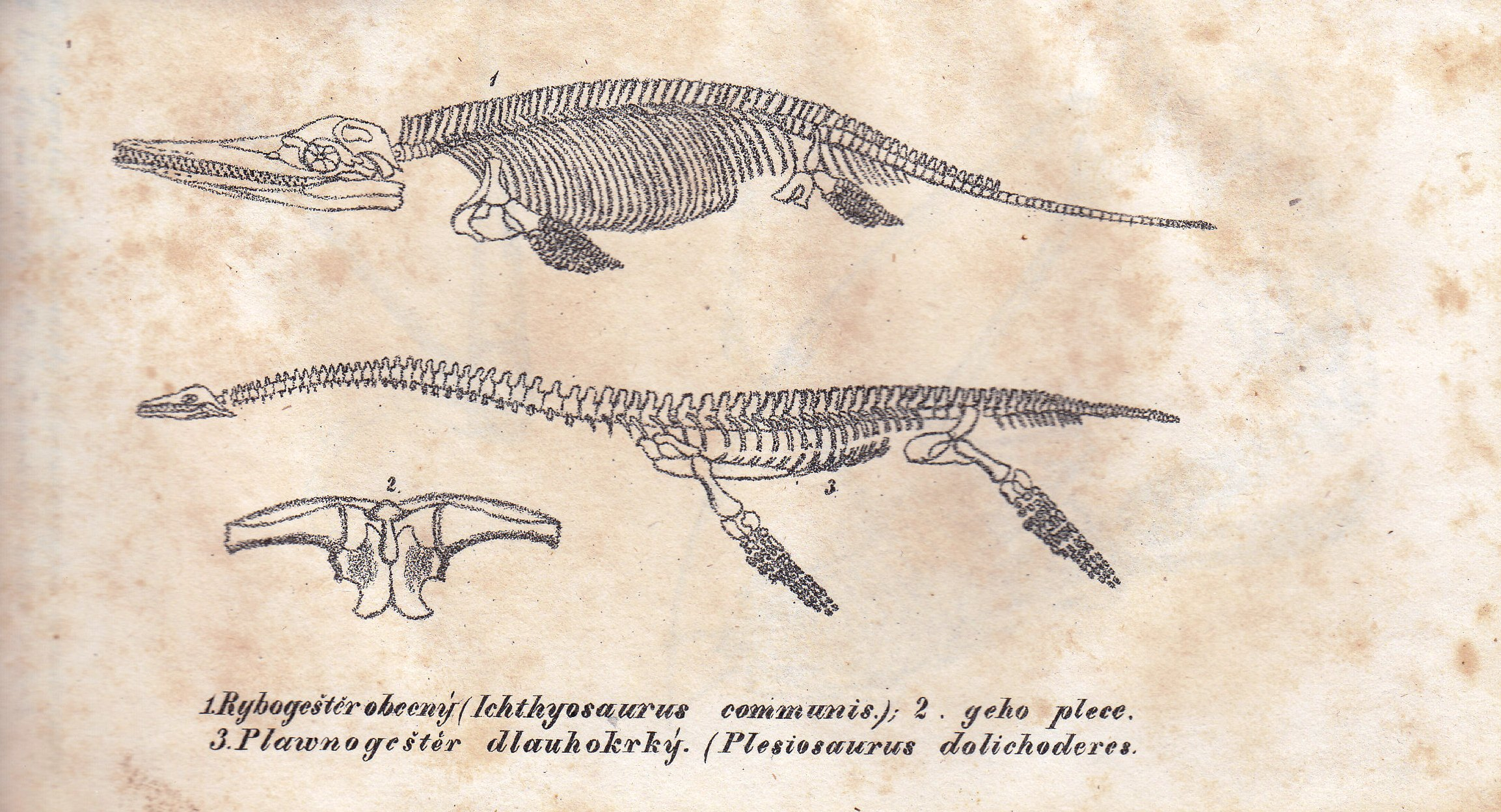
Ichthyosaurus and Plesiosaurus from the 1834 Czech edition of Cuvier's Discours sur les revolutions de la surface du globe

In 1666, Nicholas Steno examined a shark, and made the association of its teeth with the "tongue stones" of ancient Greco-Roman mythology, concluding that those were not in fact the tongues of venomous snakes, but the teeth of some long-extinct species of shark.

Robert Hooke (1635–1703) included micrographs of fossils in his Micrographia and was among the first to observe fossil forams. His observations on fossils, which he stated to be the petrified remains of creatures some of which no longer existed, were published posthumously in 1705.

William Smith (1769–1839), an English canal engineer, observed that rocks of different ages (based on the law of superposition) preserved different assemblages of fossils, and that these assemblages succeeded one another in a regular and determinable order. He observed that rocks from distant locations could be correlated based on the fossils they contained. He termed this the principle of faunal succession. This principle became one of Darwin's chief pieces of evidence that biological evolution was real.

Georges Cuvier came to believe that most if not all the animal fossils he examined were remains of extinct species. This led Cuvier to become an active proponent of the geological school of thought called catastrophism. Near the end of his 1796 paper on living and fossil elephants he said:

All of these facts, consistent among themselves, and not opposed by any report, seem to me to prove the existence of a world previous to ours, destroyed by some kind of catastrophe.

Interest in fossils, and geology more generally, expanded during the early nineteenth century. In Britain, Mary Anning's discoveries of fossils, including the first complete ichthyosaur and a complete plesiosaurus skeleton, sparked both public and scholarly interest.

=== Linnaeus and Darwin ===
Early naturalists well understood the similarities and differences of living species leading Linnaeus to develop a hierarchical classification system still in use today. Darwin and his contemporaries first linked the hierarchical structure of the tree of life with the then very sparse fossil record. Darwin eloquently described a process of descent with modification, or evolution, whereby organisms either adapt to natural and changing environmental pressures, or they perish.

When Darwin wrote On the Origin of Species by Means of Natural Selection, or the Preservation of Favoured Races in the Struggle for Life, the oldest animal fossils were those from the Cambrian Period, now known to be about 540 million years old. He worried about the absence of older fossils because of the implications on the validity of his theories, but he expressed hope that such fossils would be found, noting that: "only a small portion of the world is known with accuracy." Darwin also pondered the sudden appearance of many groups (i.e. phyla) in the oldest known Cambrian fossiliferous strata.

=== After Darwin ===
Since Darwin's time, the fossil record has been extended to between 2.3 and 3.5 billion years. Most of these Precambrian fossils are microscopic bacteria or microfossils. However, macroscopic fossils are now known from the late Proterozoic. The Ediacara biota (also called Vendian biota) dating from 575 million years ago collectively constitutes a richly diverse assemblage of early multicellular eukaryotes.

The fossil record and faunal succession form the basis of the science of biostratigraphy or determining the age of rocks based on embedded fossils. For the first 150 years of geology, biostratigraphy and superposition were the only means for determining the relative age of rocks. The geologic time scale was developed based on the relative ages of rock strata as determined by the early paleontologists and stratigraphers.

Since the early years of the twentieth century, absolute dating methods, such as radiometric dating (including potassium/argon, argon/argon, uranium series, and, for very recent fossils, radiocarbon dating) have been used to verify the relative ages obtained by fossils and to provide absolute ages for many fossils. Radiometric dating has shown that the earliest known stromatolites are over 3.4 billion years old.

=== Modern era ===
The fossil record is life's evolutionary epic that unfolded over four billion years as environmental conditions and genetic potential interacted in accordance with natural selection.

— The Virtual Fossil Museum

Paleontology has joined with evolutionary biology to share the interdisciplinary task of outlining the tree of life, which inevitably leads backwards in time to Precambrian microscopic life when cell structure and functions evolved. Earth's deep time in the Proterozoic and deeper still in the Archean is only "recounted by microscopic fossils and subtle chemical signals." Molecular biologists, using phylogenetics, can compare protein amino acid or nucleotide sequence homology (i.e., similarity) to evaluate taxonomy and evolutionary distances among organisms, with limited statistical confidence. The study of fossils, on the other hand, can more specifically pinpoint when and in what organism a mutation first appeared. Phylogenetics and paleontology work together in the clarification of science's still dim view of the appearance of life and its evolution.

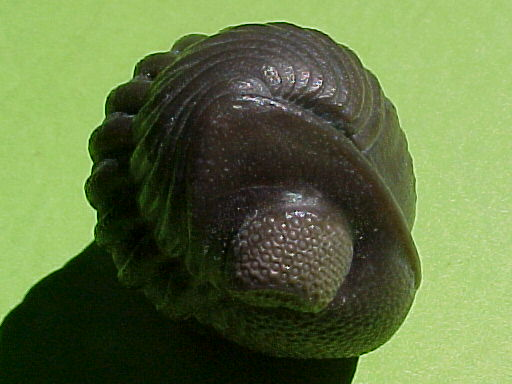
Phacopid trilobite Eldredgeops rana crassituberculata. The genus is named after Niles Eldredge

Niles Eldredge's study of the Phacops trilobite genus supported the hypothesis that modifications to the arrangement of the trilobite's eye lenses proceeded by fits and starts over millions of years during the Devonian. Eldredge's interpretation of the Phacops fossil record was that the aftermaths of the lens changes, but not the rapidly occurring evolutionary process, were fossilized. This and other data led Stephen Jay Gould and Niles Eldredge to publish their seminal paper on punctuated equilibrium in 1971.

Synchrotron X-ray tomographic analysis of early Cambrian bilaterian embryonic microfossils yielded new insights of metazoan evolution at its earliest stages. The tomography technique provides previously unattainable three-dimensional resolution at the limits of fossilization. Fossils of two enigmatic bilaterians, the worm-like Markuelia and a putative, primitive protostome, Pseudooides, provide a peek at germ layer embryonic development. These 543-million-year-old embryos support the emergence of some aspects of arthropod development earlier than previously thought in the late Proterozoic. The preserved embryos from China and Siberia were rapidly replaced by phosphates after burial, preserving minute cellular structures. This research is a notable example of how knowledge encoded by the fossil record continues to contribute otherwise unattainable information on the emergence and development of life on Earth. For example, the research suggests Markuelia has closest affinity to priapulid worms, and is also close to nematodes and arthropods.

Despite significant advances in uncovering and identifying paleontological specimens, it is generally accepted that the fossil record is vastly incomplete. Approaches for measuring the completeness of the fossil record have been developed for numerous subsets of species, including those grouped taxonomically, temporally, environmentally/geographically, or in sum. This encompasses the subfield of taphonomy and the study of biases in the paleontological record.

== Dating/Age ==
=== Stratigraphy and estimations ===
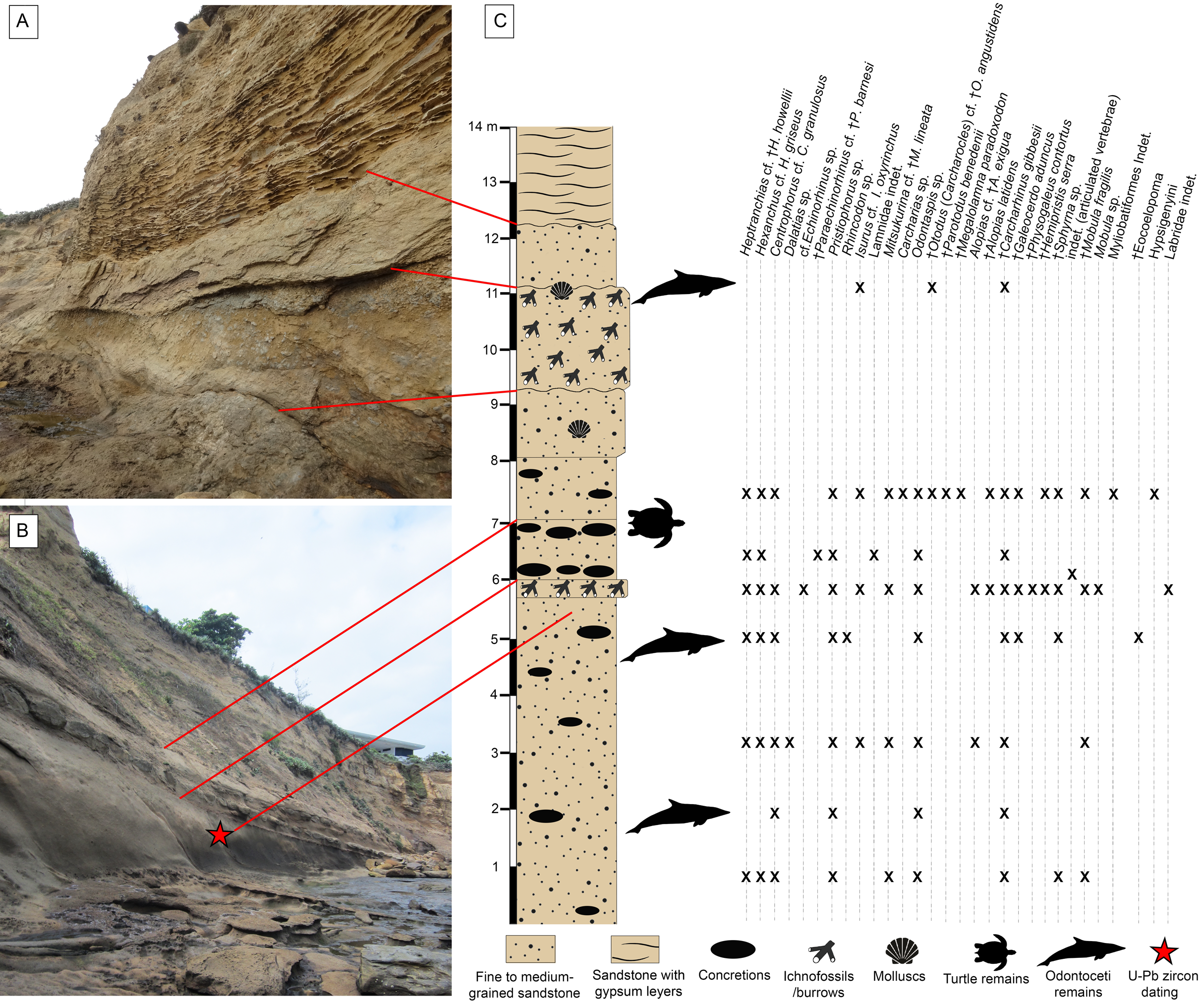
Stratigraphy of the Montañita-Olón locality of the Dos Bocas Formation. Stratigraphy is a useful branch when it comes to the understanding of the successive layers of rock and their fossiliferous content, giving insight into the relative age of fossils

Paleontology seeks to map out how life evolved across geologic time. A substantial hurdle is the difficulty of working out fossil ages. Beds that preserve fossils typically lack the radioactive elements needed for radiometric dating. This technique is our only means of giving rocks greater than about 50 million years old an absolute age, and can be accurate to within 0.5% or better. Although radiometric dating requires careful laboratory work, its basic principle is simple: the rates at which various radioactive elements decay are known, and so the ratio of the radioactive element to its decay products shows how long ago the radioactive element was incorporated into the rock. Radioactive elements are common only in rocks with a volcanic origin, and so the only fossil-bearing rocks that can be dated radiometrically are volcanic ash layers, which may provide termini for the intervening sediments.

Consequently, palaeontologists rely on stratigraphy to date fossils. Stratigraphy is the science of deciphering the "layer-cake" that is the sedimentary record. Rocks normally form relatively horizontal layers, with each layer younger than the one underneath it. If a fossil is found between two layers whose ages are known, the fossil's age is claimed to lie between the two known ages. Because rock sequences are not continuous, but may be broken up by faults or periods of erosion, it is very difficult to match up rock beds that are not directly adjacent. However, fossils of species that survived for a relatively short time can be used to match isolated rocks: this technique is called biostratigraphy. For instance, the conodont Eoplacognathus pseudoplanus has a short range in the Middle Ordovician period. If rocks of unknown age have traces of E. pseudoplanus, they have a mid-Ordovician age. Such index fossils must be distinctive, be globally distributed and occupy a short time range to be useful. Misleading results are produced if the index fossils are incorrectly dated. Stratigraphy and biostratigraphy can in general provide only relative dating (A was before B), which is often sufficient for studying evolution. However, this is difficult for some time periods, because of the problems involved in matching rocks of the same age across continents. Family-tree relationships also help to narrow down the date when lineages first appeared. For instance, if fossils of B or C date to X million years ago and the calculated "family tree" says A was an ancestor of B and C, then A must have evolved earlier.

It is also possible to estimate how long ago two living clades diverged (i.e., the age of their last common ancestor) by assuming that mutations accumulate at a constant rate for a given gene. These "molecular clocks", however, are fallible, and provide only approximate timing: for example, they are not sufficiently precise and reliable for estimating when the groups that feature in the Cambrian explosion first evolved, and estimates produced by different techniques may vary by a factor of two.

=== Limitations ===
Organisms are only rarely preserved as fossils in the best of circumstances, and only a fraction of such fossils have been discovered. This is illustrated by the fact that the number of species known through the fossil record is less than 5% of the number of known living species, suggesting that the number of species known through fossils must be far less than 1% of all the species that have ever lived. Because of the specialized and rare circumstances required for a biological structure to fossilize, only a small percentage of life-forms can be expected to be represented in discoveries, and each discovery represents only a snapshot of the process of evolution. The transition itself can only be illustrated and corroborated by transitional fossils, which are never guaranteed to demonstrate a convenient half-way point.

The fossil record is strongly biased toward organisms with hard parts, leaving most groups of soft-bodied organisms with little to no presence. It is replete with mollusks, vertebrates, echinoderms, brachiopods, and some groups of arthropods.

== Sites ==
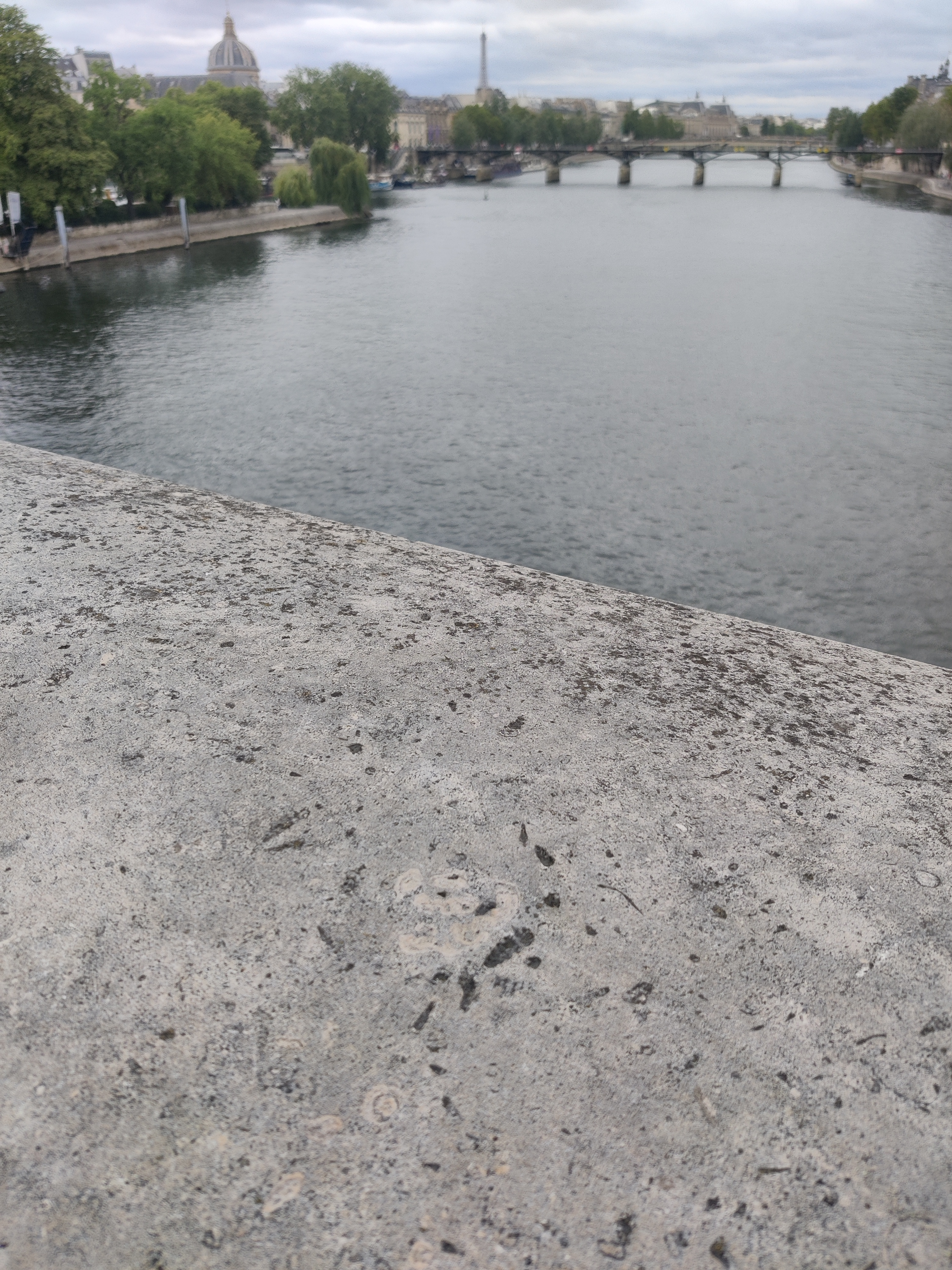
Quarried stone used for building can often include small fossils - as seen here on Pont Neuf, Paris

=== Lagerstätten ===
Fossil sites with exceptional preservation—sometimes including preserved soft tissues—are known as Lagerstätten (German for "storage places"). These formations may have resulted from carcass burial in an anoxic environment with minimal bacteria, thus slowing decomposition. Lagerstätten span geological time from the Cambrian period to the present. Worldwide, some of the best examples of near-perfect fossilization are the Cambrian Maotianshan Shales and Burgess Shale, the Devonian Hunsrück Slates, the Jurassic Solnhofen Limestone, and the Carboniferous Mazon Creek localities.

== Fossilization processes ==
=== Recrystallization ===
A fossil is said to be recrystallized when the original skeletal compounds are still present but in a different crystal form, such as from aragonite to calcite.

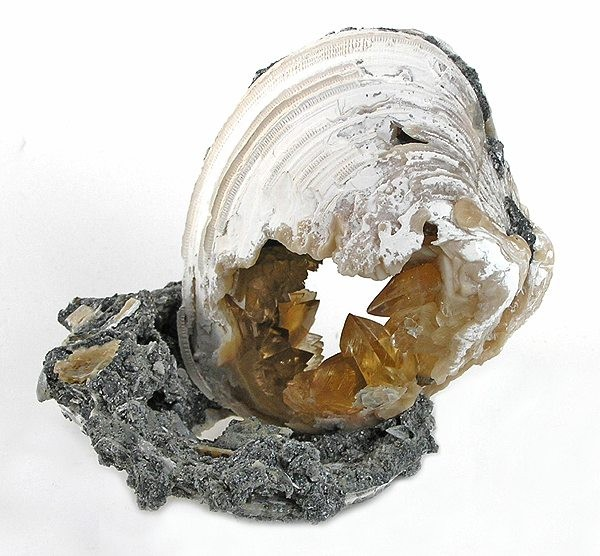
Calcite-recrystallized fossil shell of Mercenaria permagna from Fort Drum, Florida

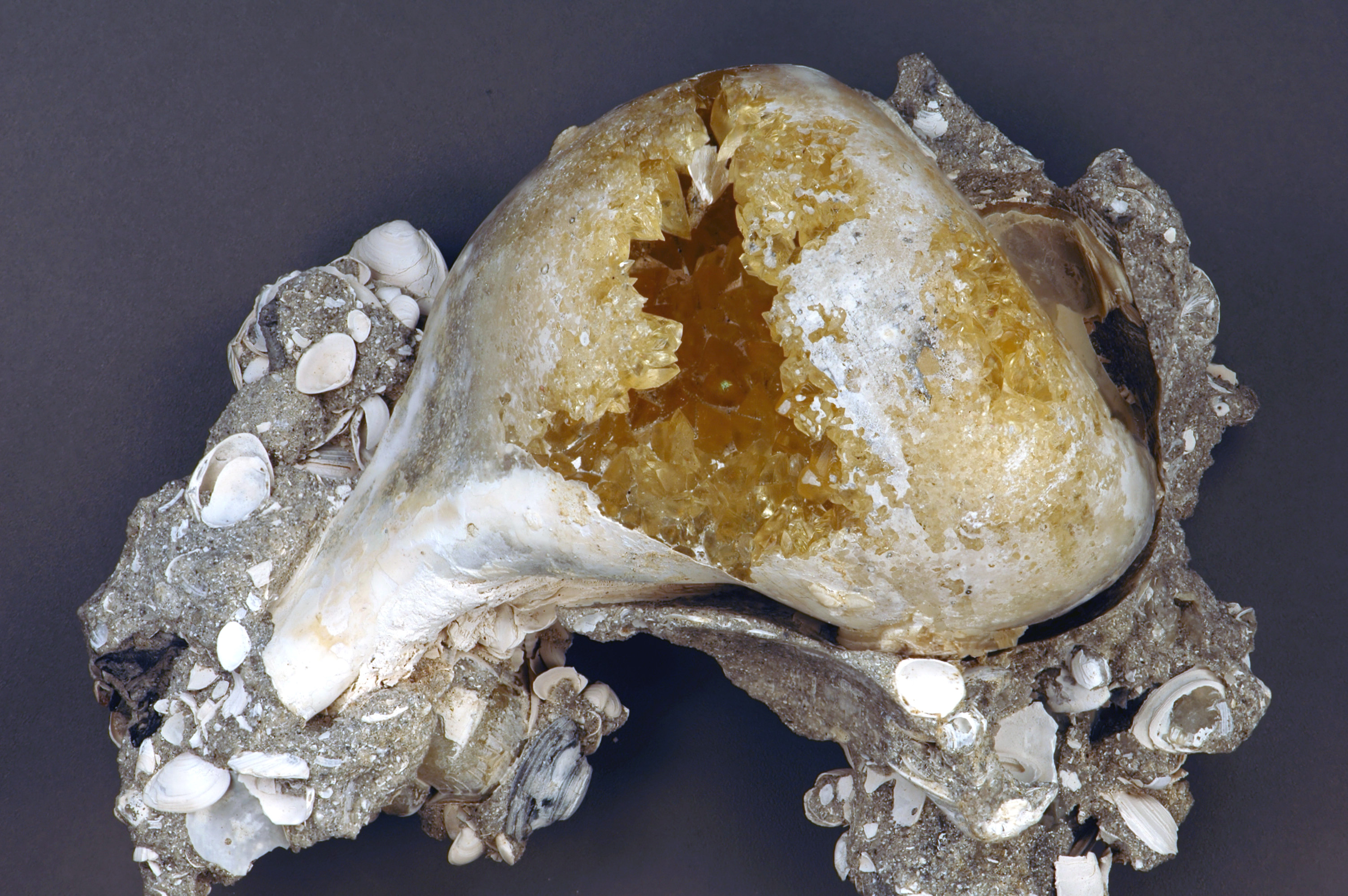
Calcite-recrystallized fossil shell of Busycon sp. from Indrio Pit

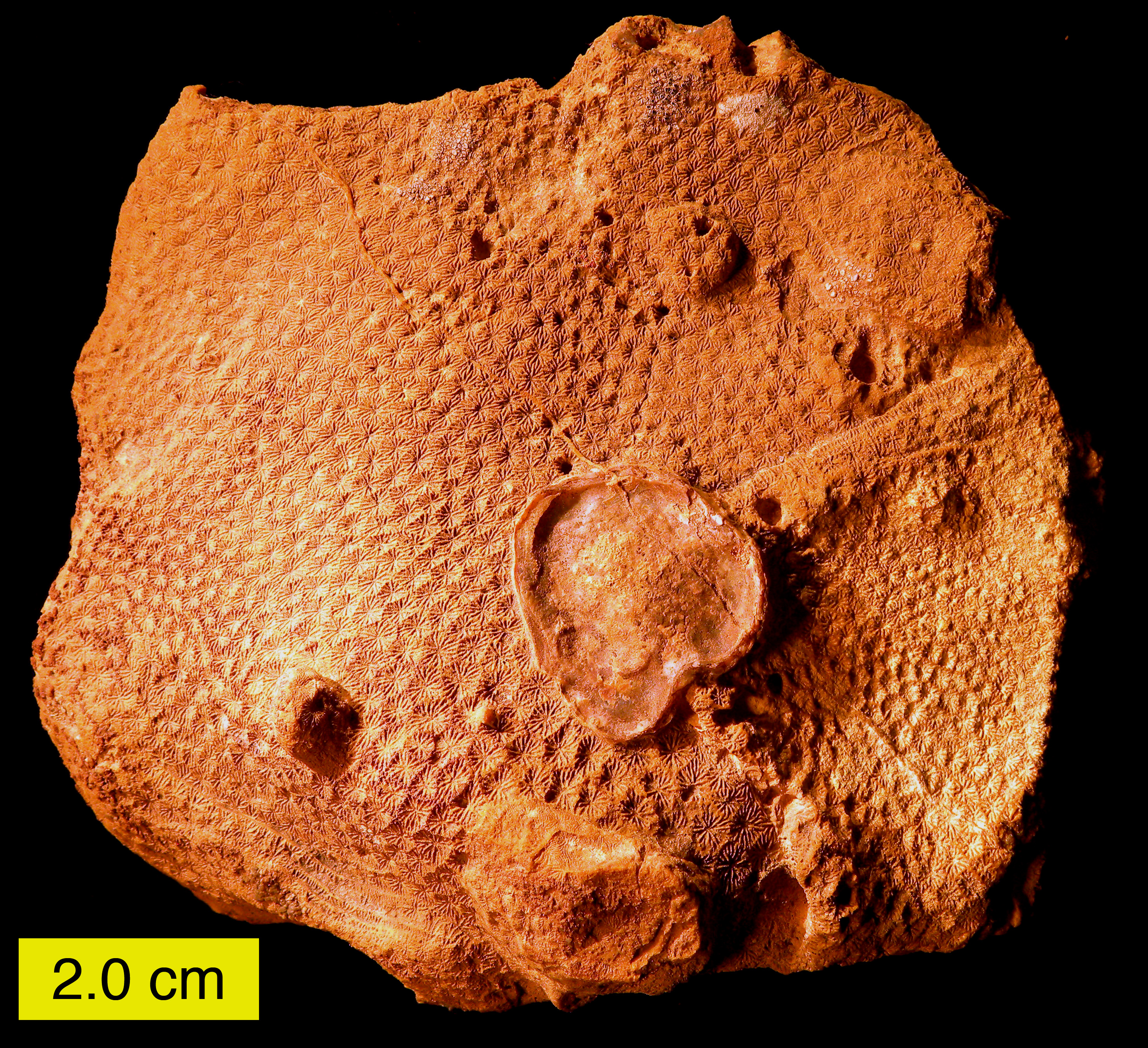
Recrystallized scleractinian coral (aragonite to calcite) from the Jurassic of southern Israel

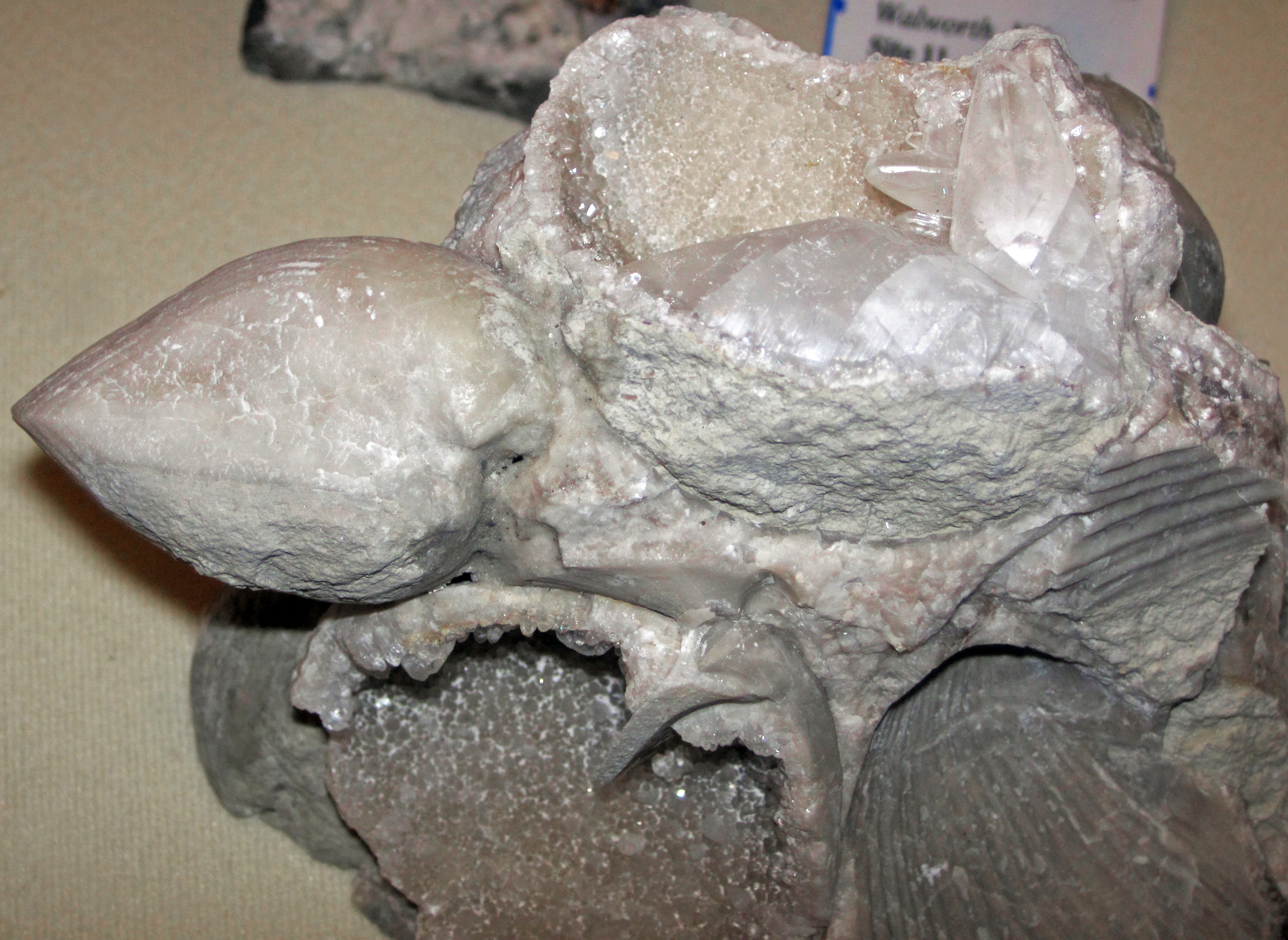
Calcite-recrystallized fossil shell of pentamerid brachiopods from Indiana

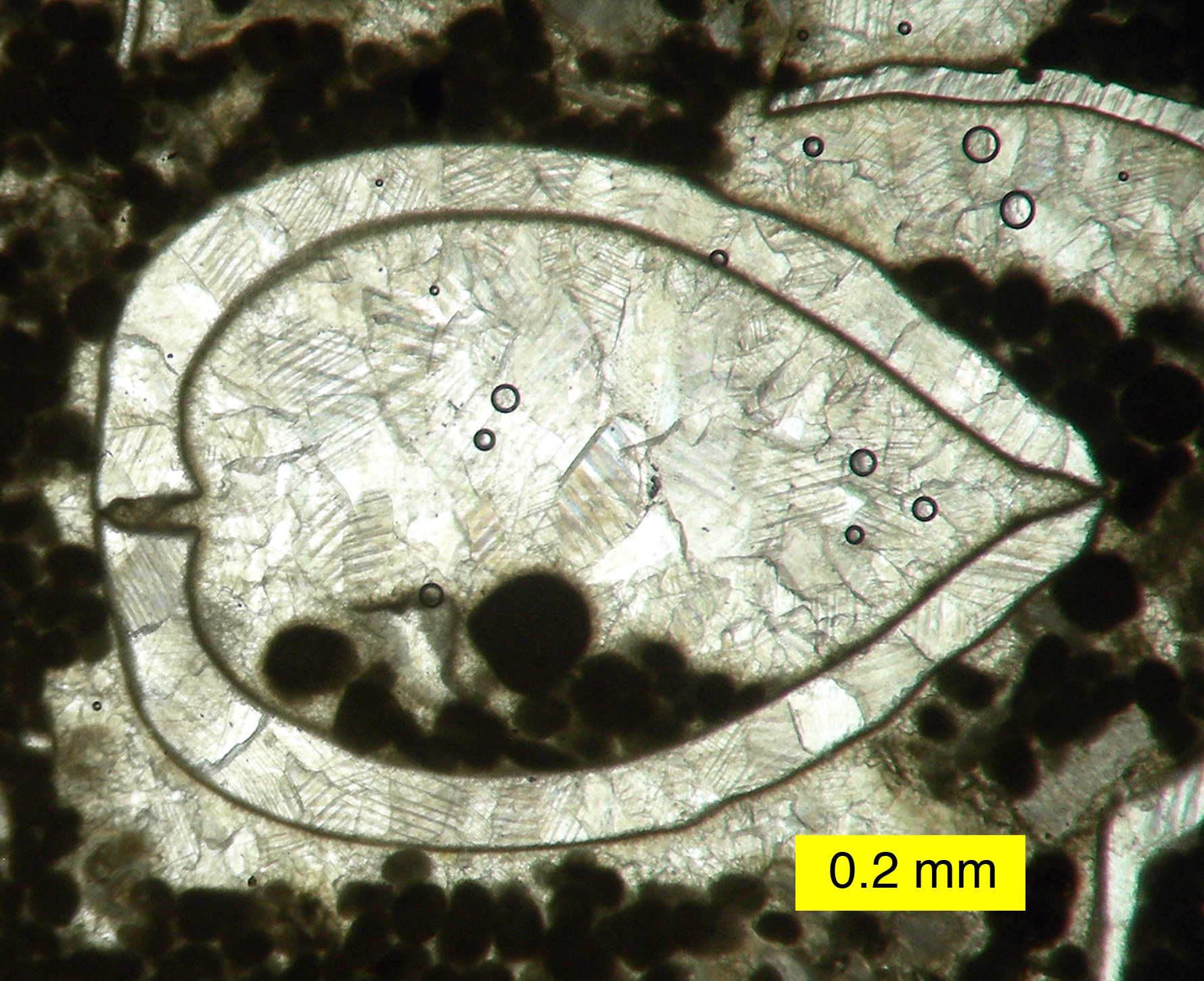
Recrystallized bivalve shell with sparry calcite from Bird Spring Formation

=== Replacement ===
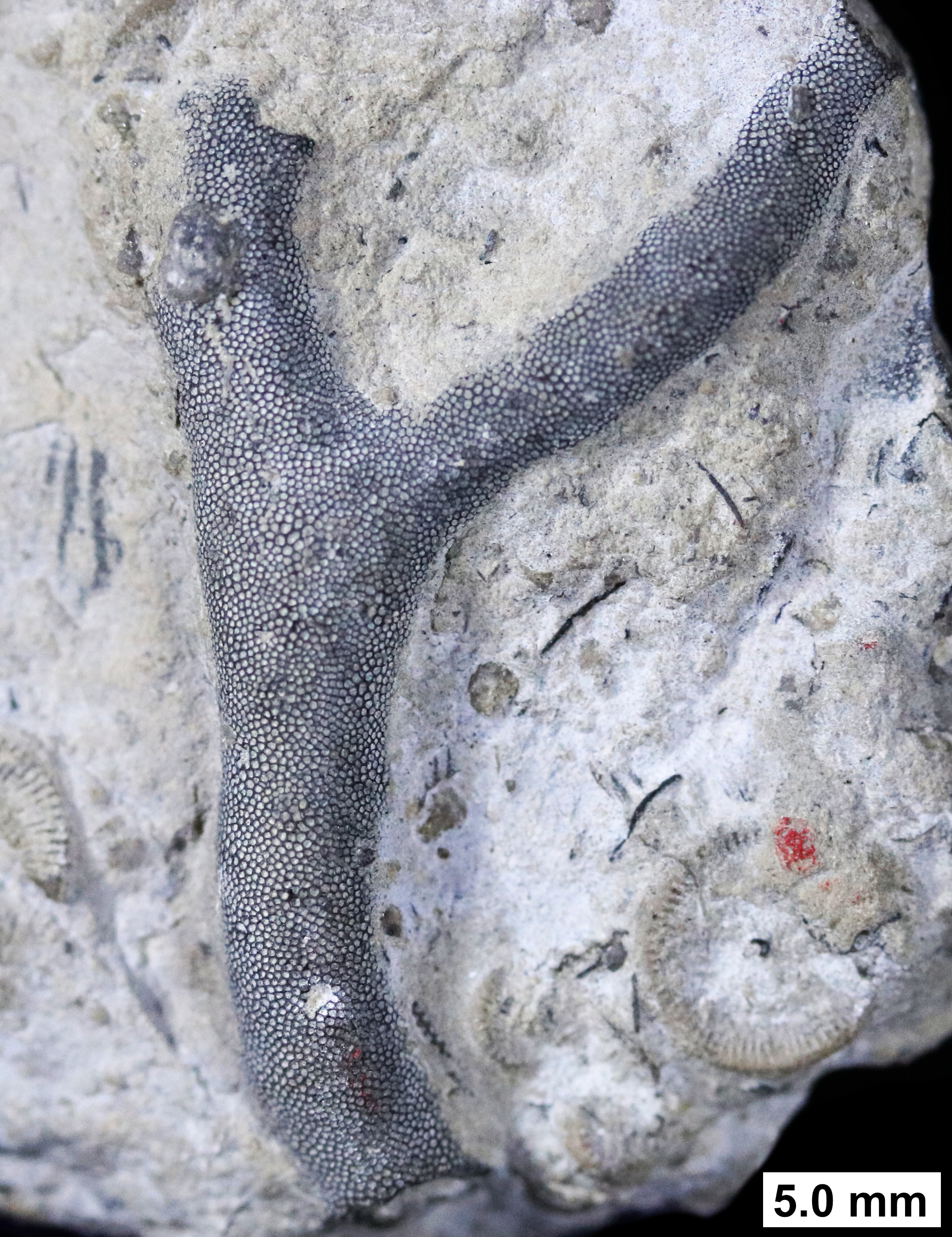
Permineralized bryozoan from the Devonian of Wisconsin

Replacement occurs when the shell, bone, or other tissue is replaced with another mineral. In some cases mineral replacement of the original shell occurs so gradually and at such fine scales that microstructural features are preserved despite the total loss of original material. Scientists can use such fossils when researching the anatomical structure of ancient species. Several species of saurids have been identified from mineralized dinosaur fossils.

==== Permineralization ====
Permineralization is a process of fossilization that occurs when an organism is buried. The empty spaces within an organism (spaces filled with liquid or gas during life) become filled with mineral-rich groundwater. Minerals precipitate from the groundwater, occupying the empty spaces. This process can occur in very small spaces, such as within the cell wall of a plant cell, and can produce very detailed fossils at small scales. For permineralization to occur, the organism must become covered by sediment soon after death, otherwise the remains are destroyed by scavengers or decomposition. The degree to which the remains are decayed when covered determines the later details of the fossil. Some fossils consist only of skeletal remains or teeth; other fossils contain traces of skin, feathers or even soft tissues. This is a form of diagenesis.

==== Phosphatization ====
Phosphatization refers to a process of fossilization where organic matter is replaced by abundant calcium-phosphate minerals. The produced fossils tend to be particularly dense and have a dark coloration that ranges from dark orange to black.

==== Pyritization ====
This fossil preservation involves the elements sulfur and iron. Organisms may become pyritized when they are in marine sediments saturated with iron sulfides. As organic matter decays, it releases sulfide which reacts with dissolved iron in the surrounding waters, forming pyrite. Pyrite replaces carbonate shell material due to an undersaturation of carbonate in the surrounding waters. Some plants become pyritized when they are in a clay terrain, but to a lesser extent than in a marine environment. Some pyritized fossils include Precambrian microfossils, marine arthropods, and plants.

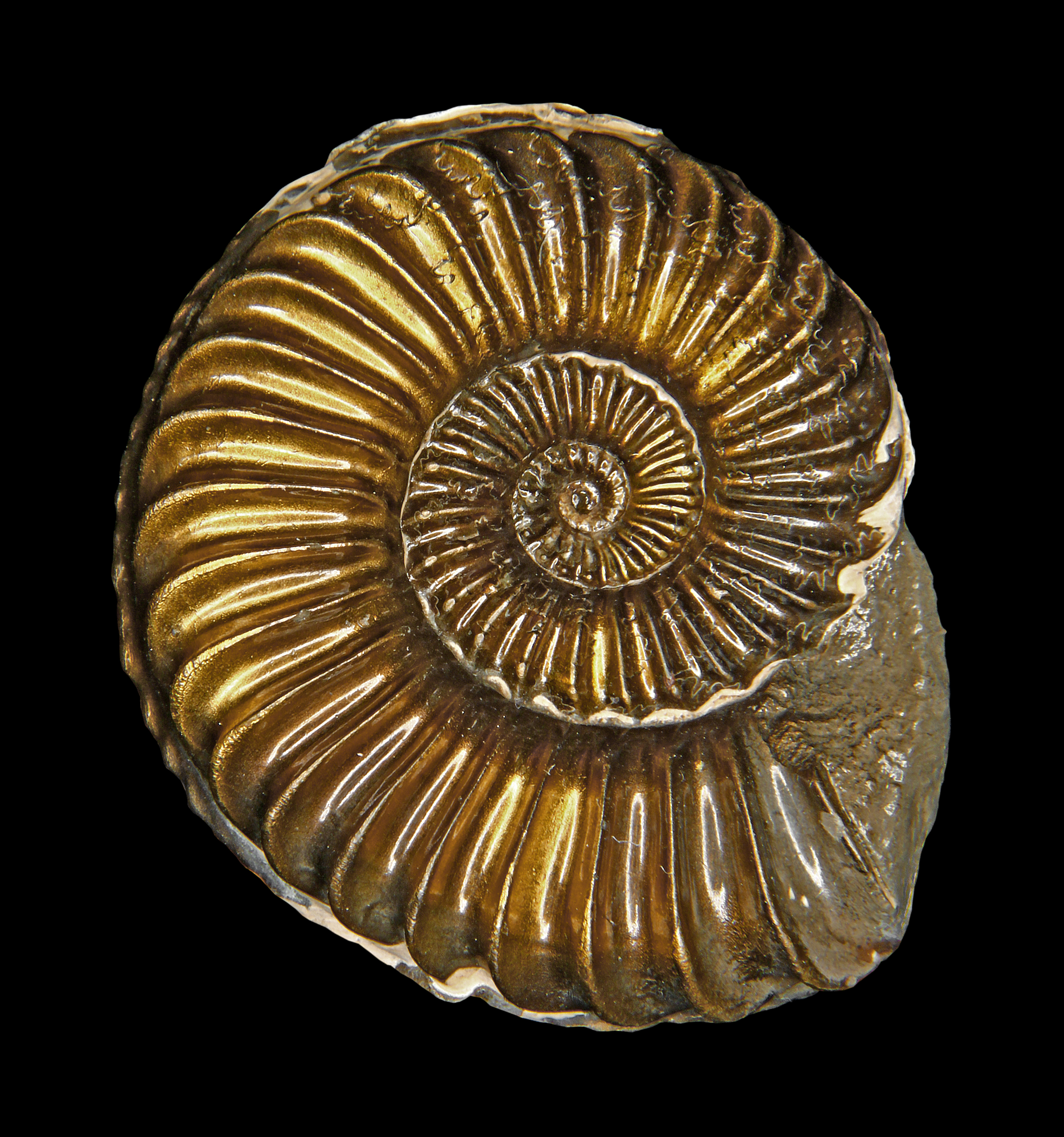
Pyritized ammonoid Pleuroceras solare fossil specimen

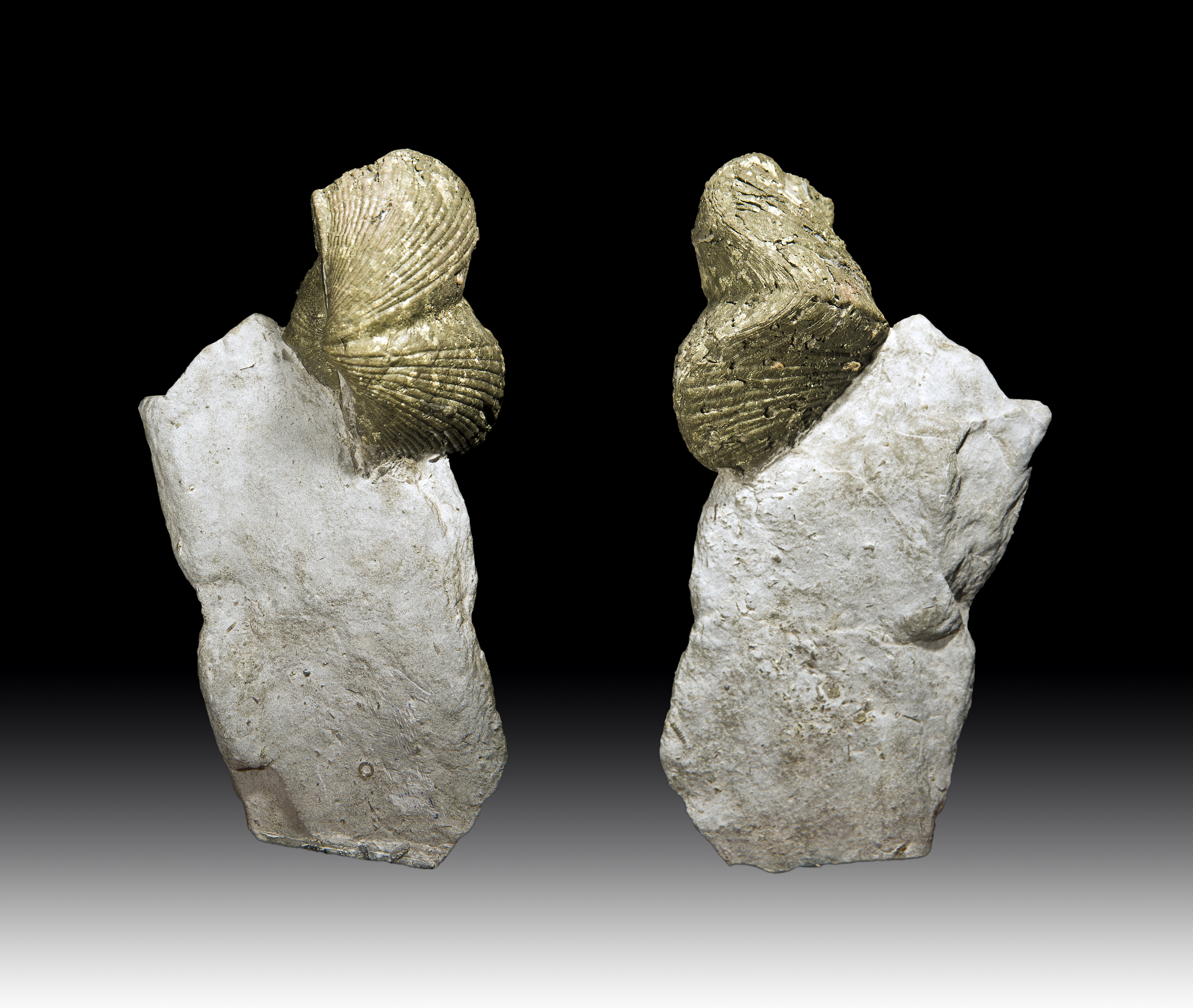
Pyritized specimen of the brachiopod Paraspirifer bownockeri

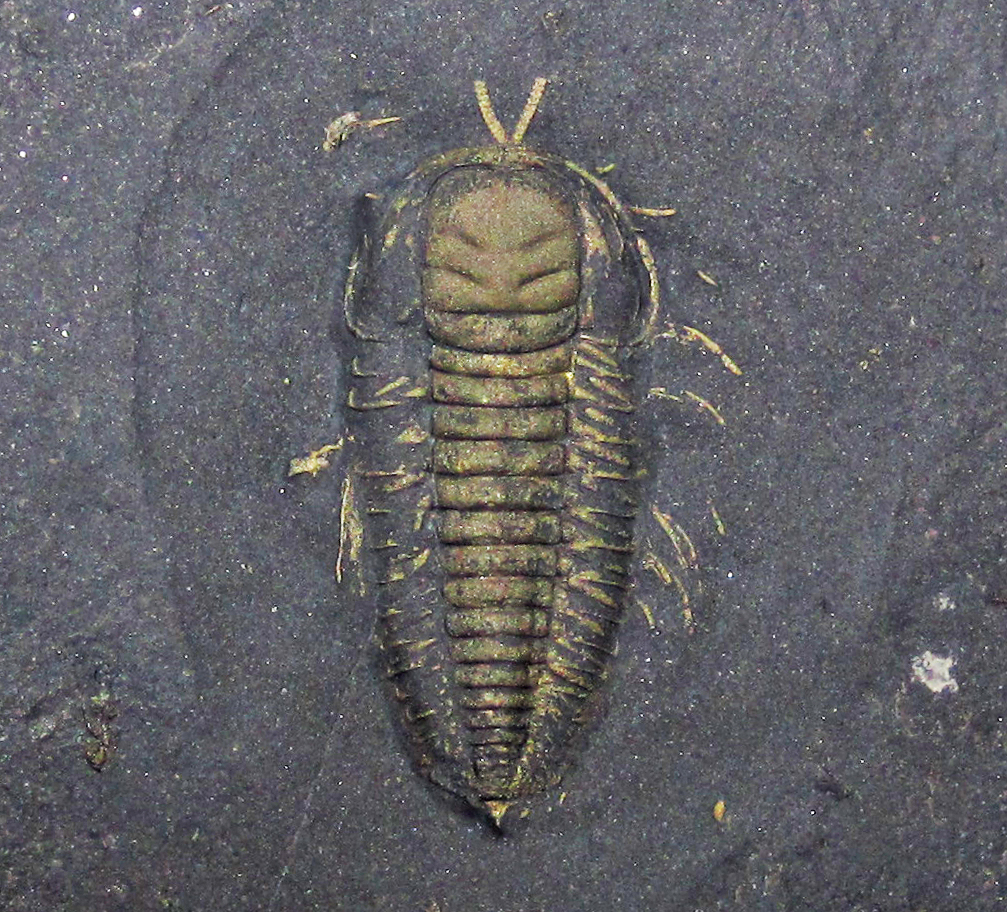
Pyritized Triarthrus eatoni from Whetstone Gulf Formation

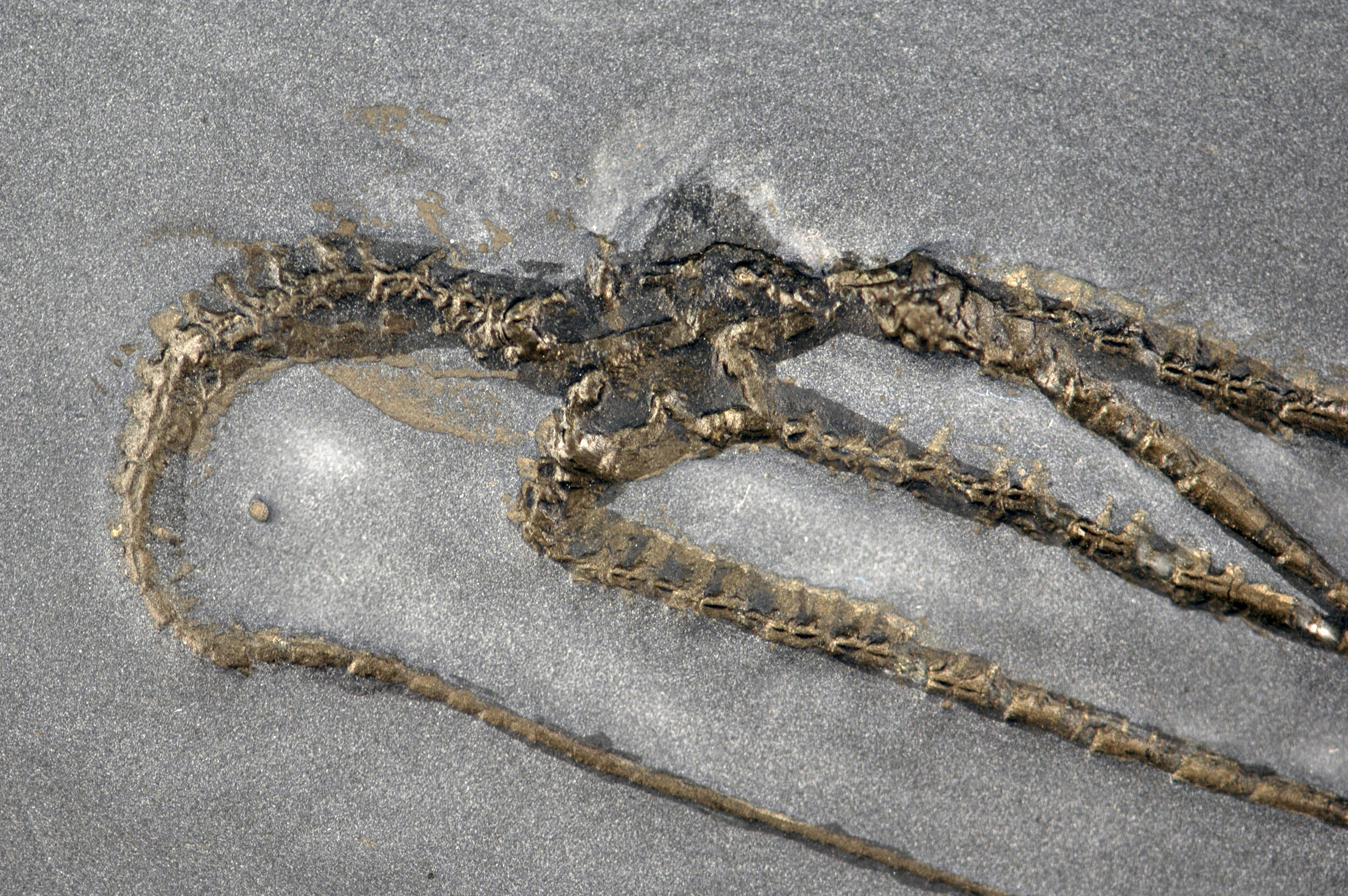
Pyritized Furcaster paleozoicus from Hunsrück Slate

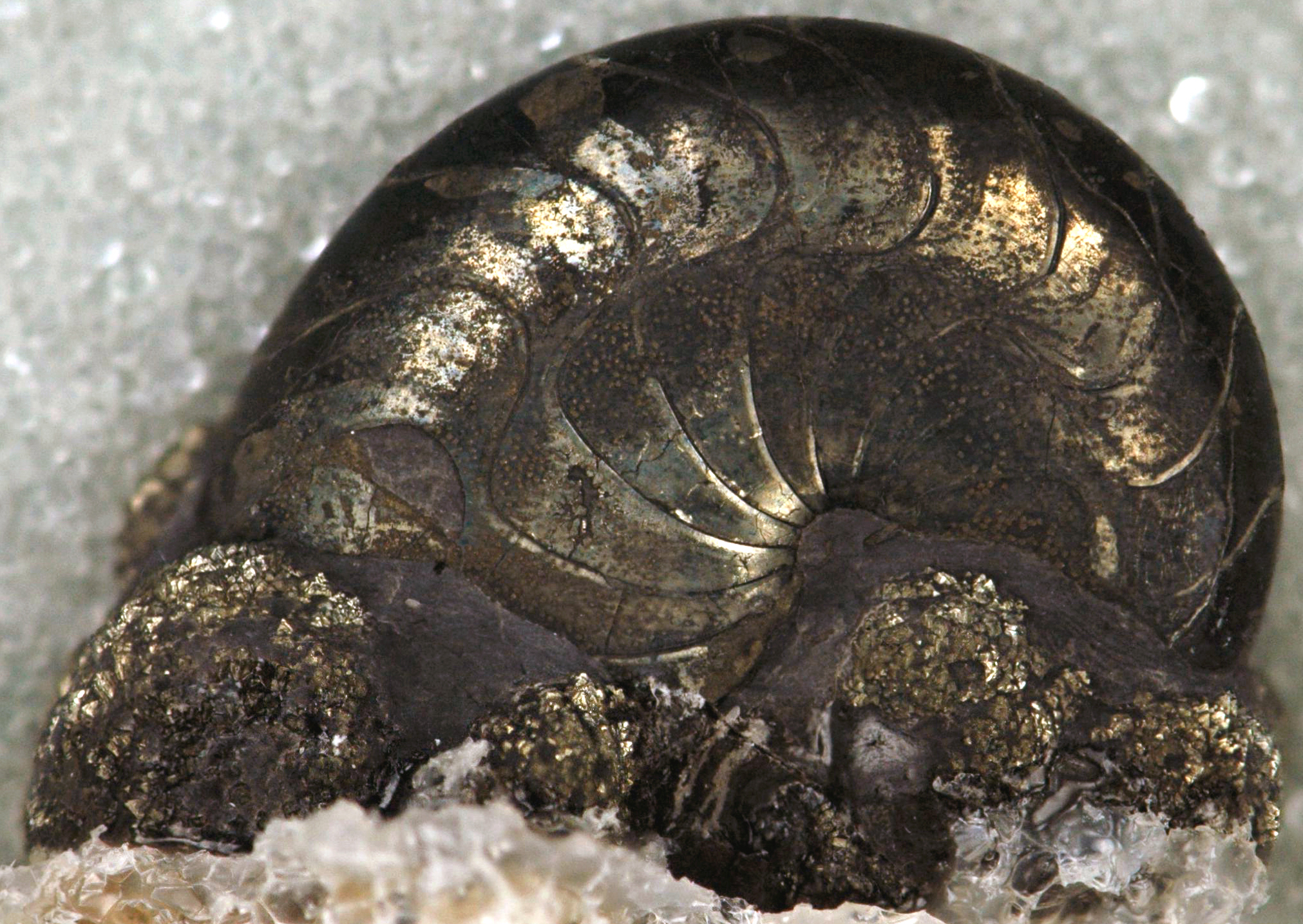
Pyritized Tornoceras uniangulare from Ludlowville Formation

==== Silicification ====
In silicification, the precipitation of silica from saturated water bodies is responsible for the fossil's formation and preservation. The mineral-laden water permeates the pores and cells of some dead organism, where it becomes a gel. Over time, the gel will dehydrate, forming a silica-rich crystal structure, which can be expressed in the form of quartz, chalcedony, agate, opal, among others, with the shape of the original remain.

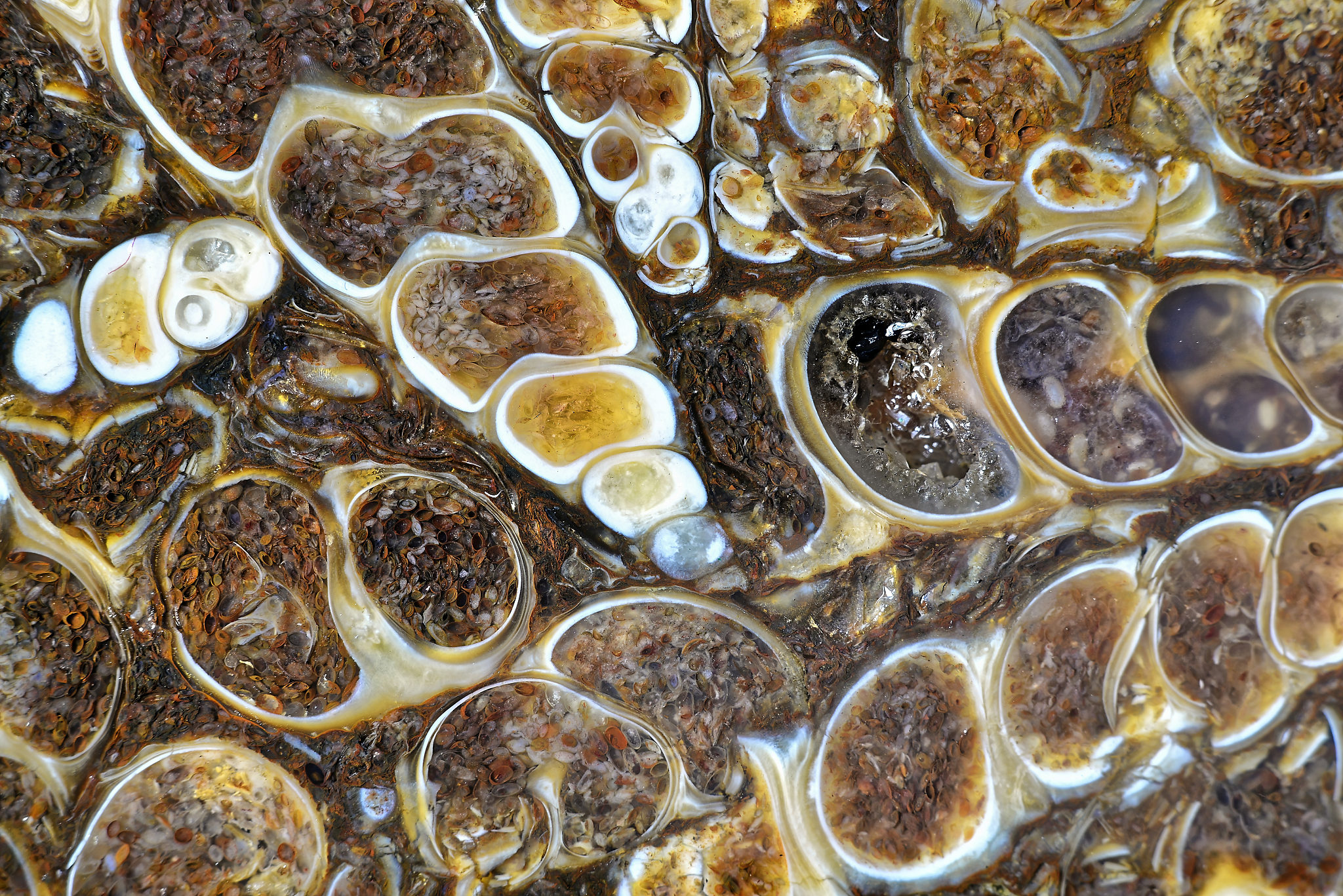
Chalcedony replaced fossil shells of Elimia tenera with inclusions of ostracods

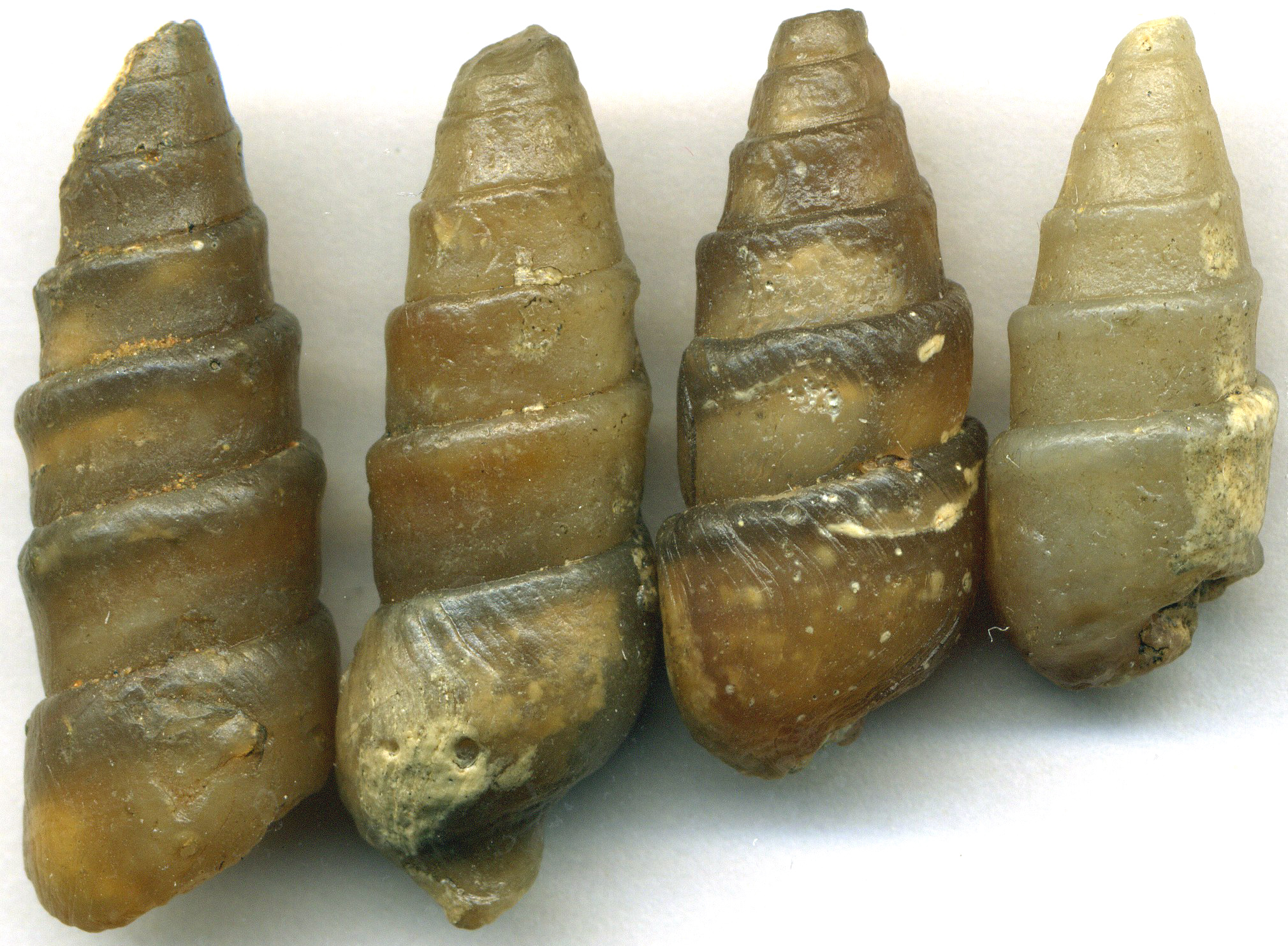
Chalcedonized gastropods internal molds

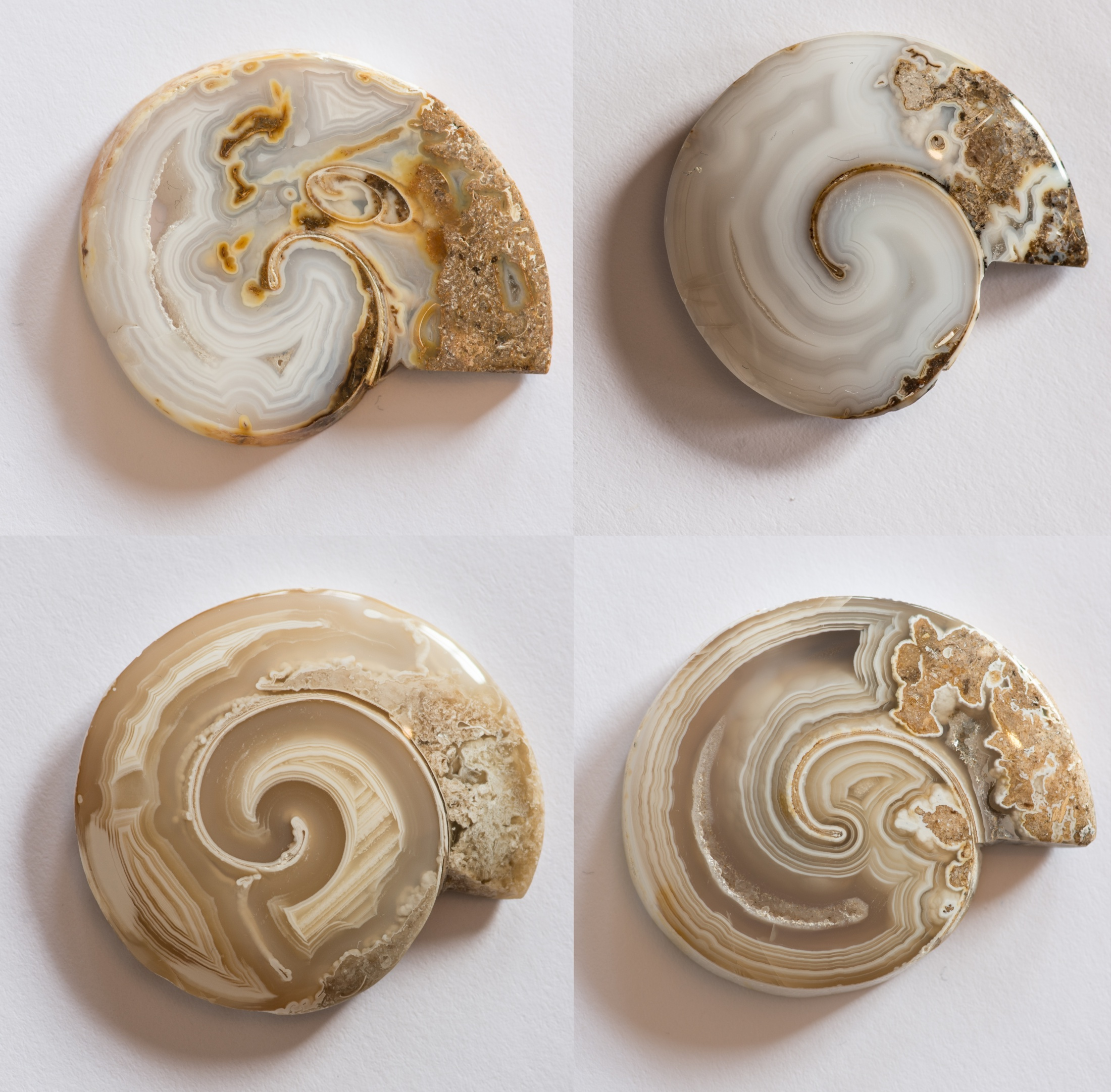
Agatized internal molds of gastropods from Deccan Traps

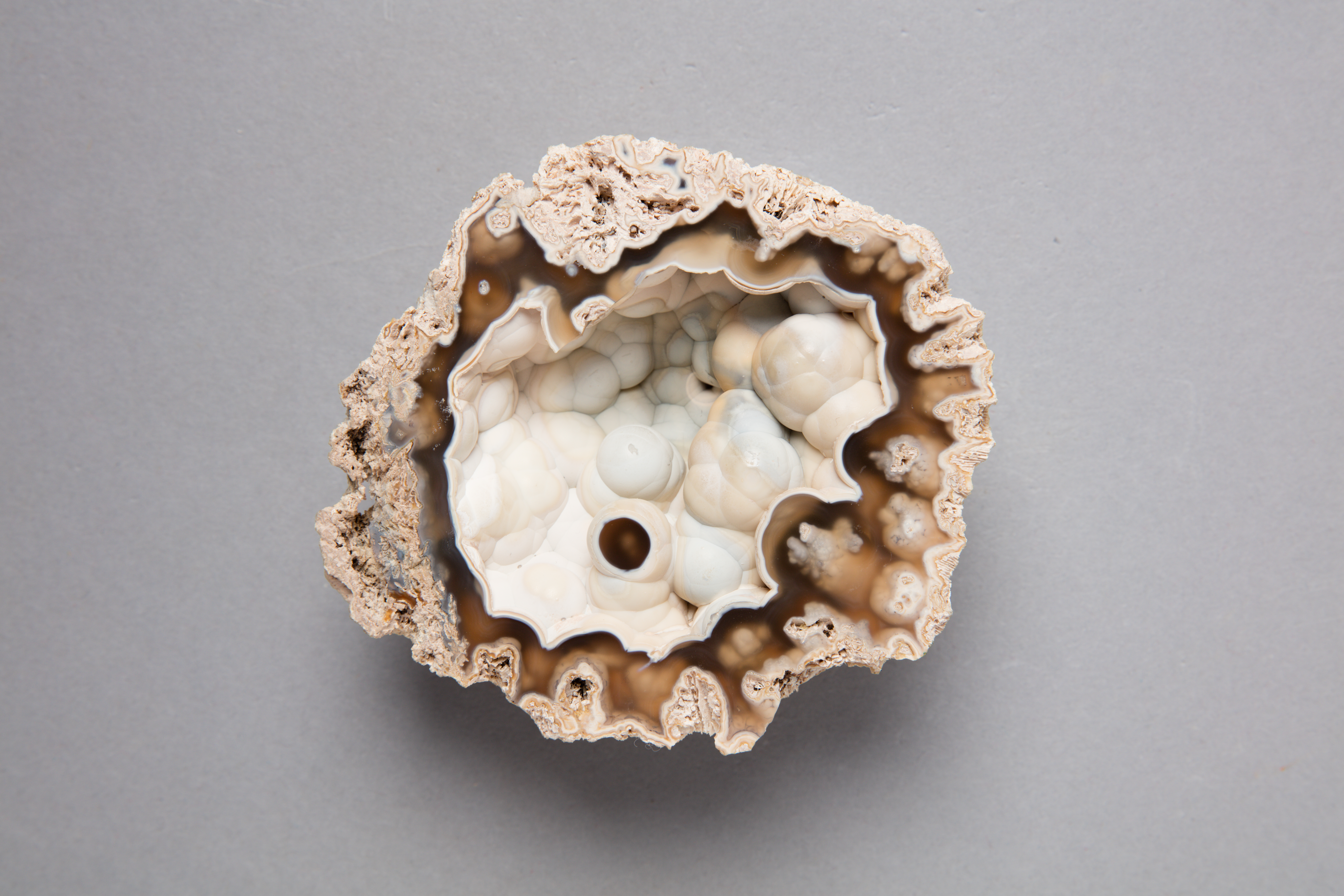
Agatized fossil coral from Florida

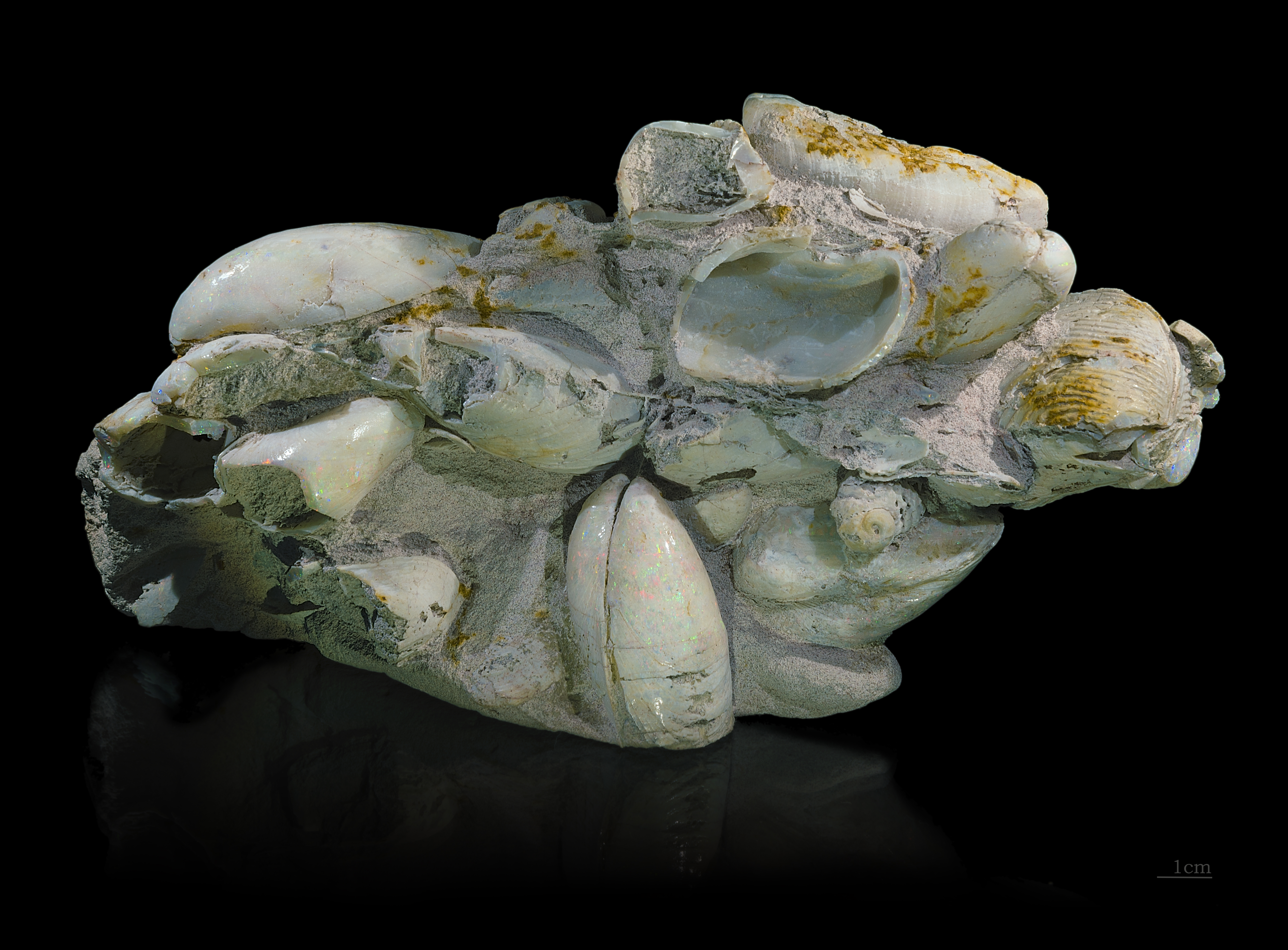
Fossil bivalves replaced by opal, from Queensland

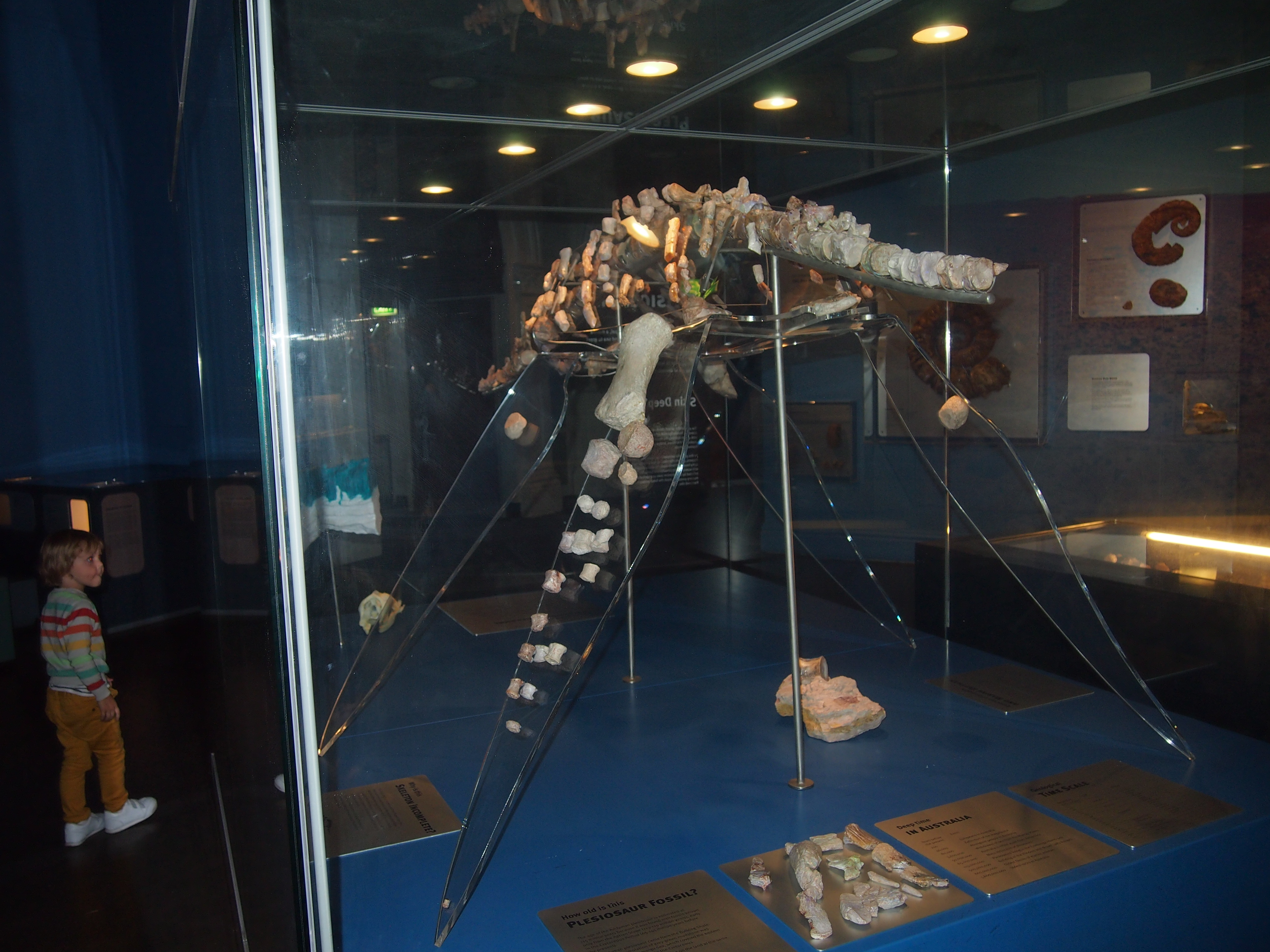
Rear view of an opalized Addyman Plesiosaur fossil at the South Australian Museum

=== Casts and molds ===
In some cases, the original remains of the organism completely dissolve or are otherwise destroyed. The remaining organism-shaped hole in the rock is called an external mold. If this void is later filled with sediment, the resulting cast resembles what the organism looked like. An endocast, or internal mold, is the result of sediments filling an organism's interior, such as the inside of a bivalve or snail or the hollow of a skull. Endocasts are sometimes termed Steinkerns, especially when bivalves are preserved this way.

The term "cast" is also used in a different context for human-made replicas of fossils. A cast-maker pours silicone rubber over an original fossil to capture its form. Once removed, the silicone acts as a mold to be refilled with a liquid such as plaster, which hardens into a plaster cast. Many fossils are too fragile to safely display or transport, and casts allow their anatomical details to become available to other museums or public exhibits. More recent technologies such as 3D printing serve a similar purpose.

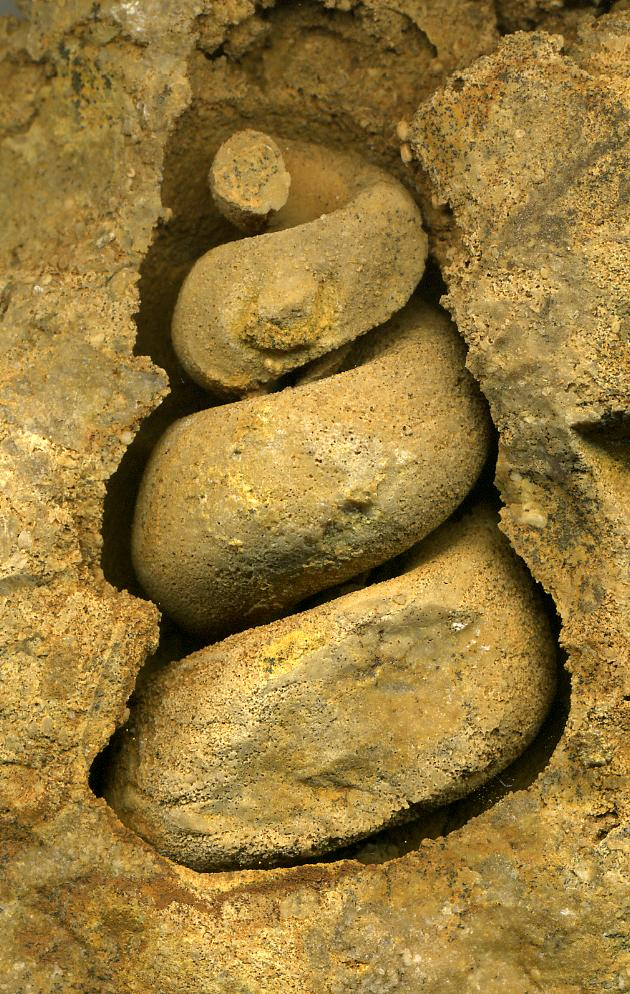
Internal mold (steinkern) of Hormotoma sp. from Galena Formation

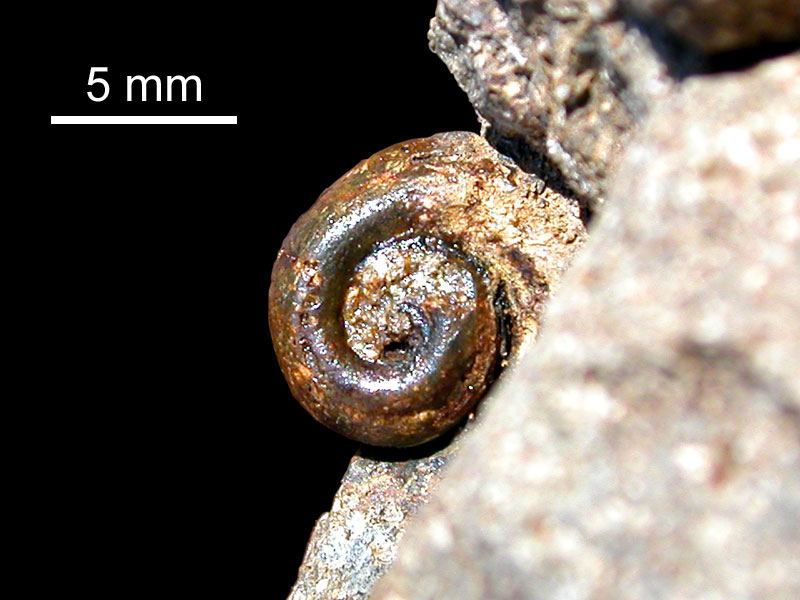
Gastropod internal mold (steinkern) from Ventana Formation

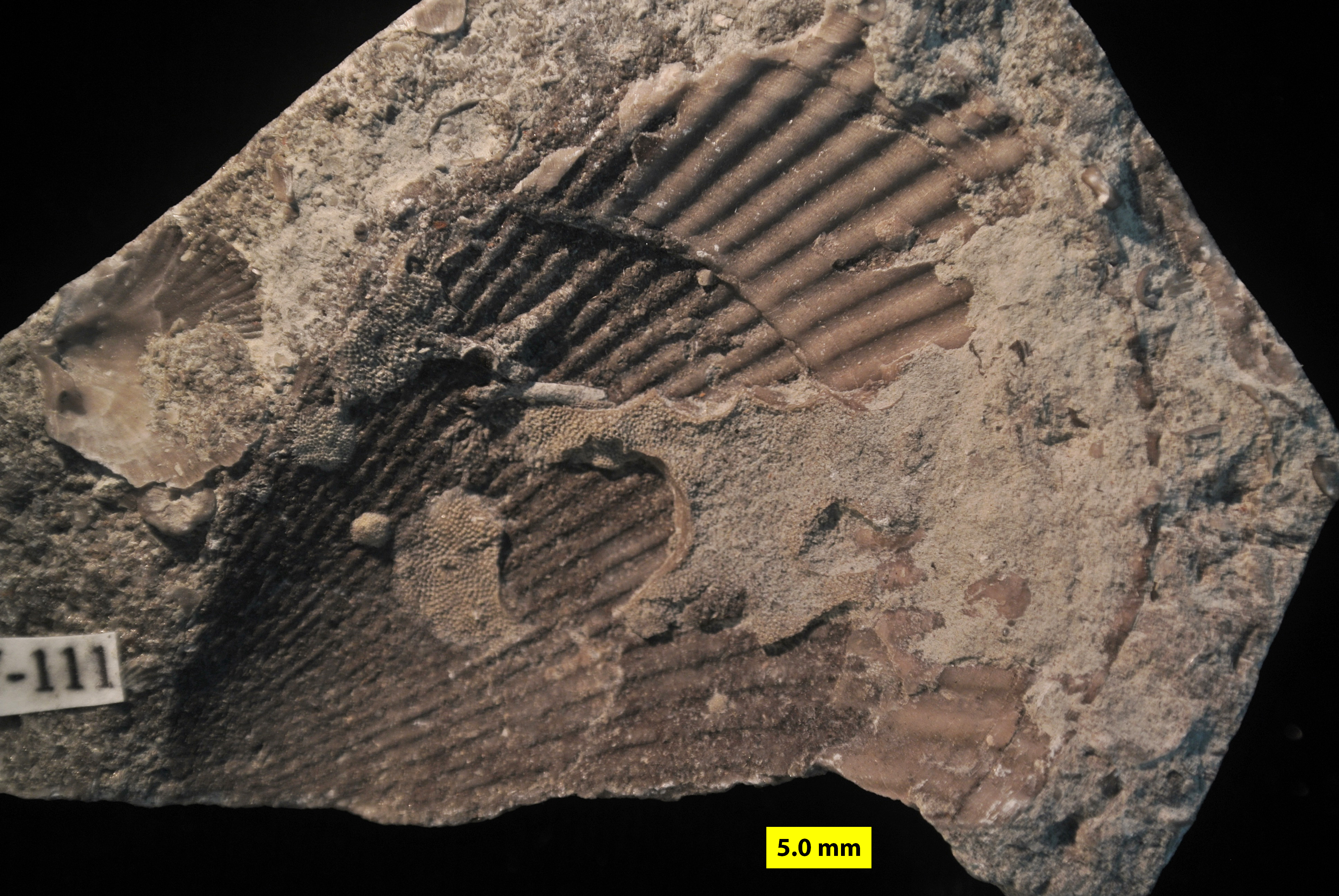
Shell external mold of Anomalodonta gigantea from Waynesville Formation

Internal mold (steinkern) of Glycymeris alpinus, Austria

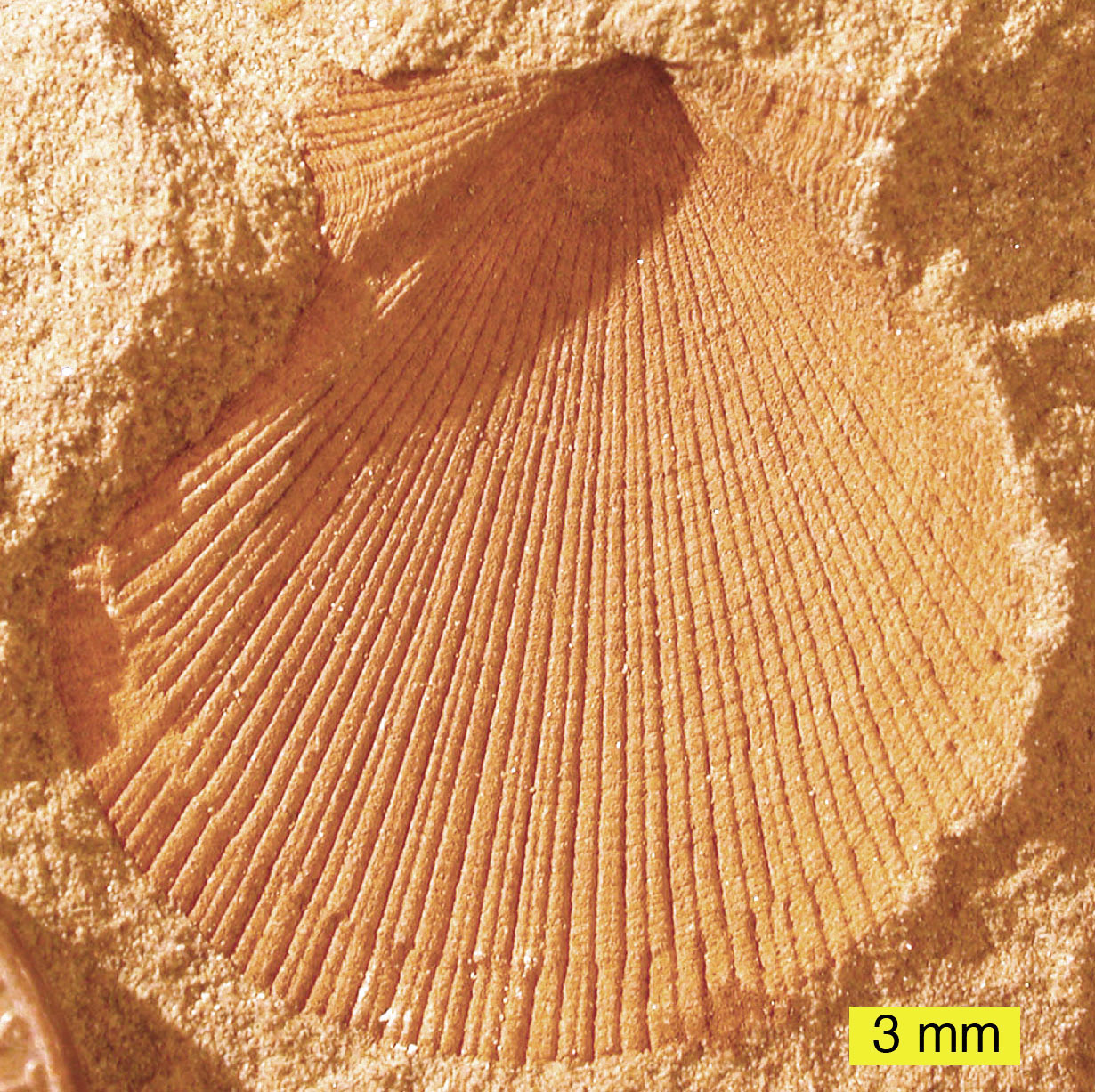
External mold of Aviculopecten subcardiformis from the Logan Formation, Lower Carboniferous, Ohio

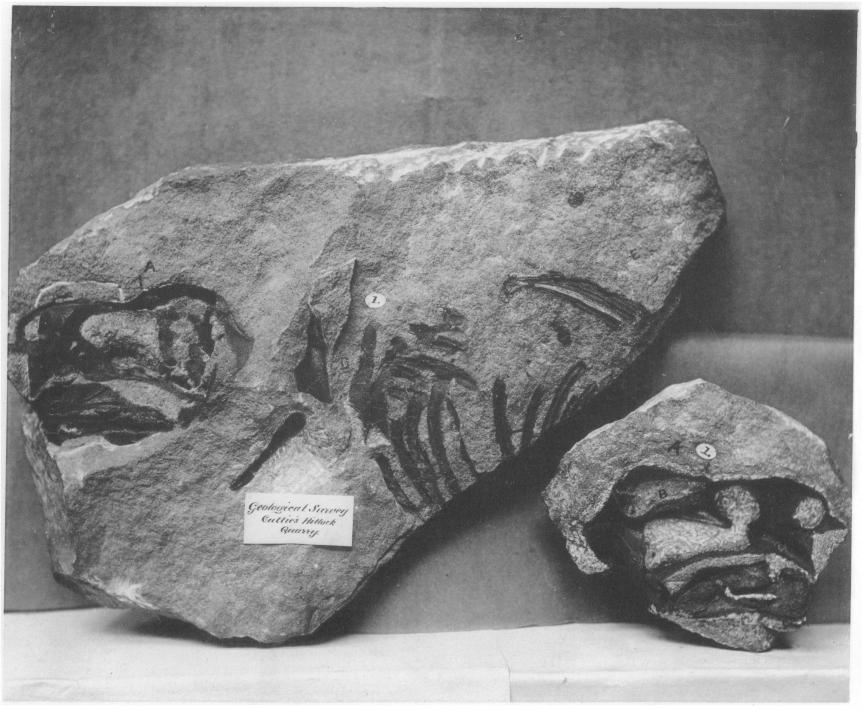
External mold of the dicynodont therapsid Gordonia traquairi from the Late Permian Hopeman Sandstone Formation, Scotland

==== Authigenic mineralization ====
This is a special form of cast and mold formation. If the chemistry is right, the organism (or fragment of organism) can act as a nucleus for the precipitation of minerals such as siderite, resulting in a nodule forming around it. If this happens rapidly before significant decay to the organic tissue, very fine three-dimensional morphological detail can be preserved. Nodules from the Carboniferous Mazon Creek fossil beds of Illinois, US, are among the best documented examples of such mineralization.

=== Adpression (compression-impression) ===
Compression fossils, such as those of fossil ferns, are the result of chemical reduction of the complex organic molecules composing the organism's tissues. In this case, the fossil consists of original material, albeit in a geochemically altered state. This chemical change is an example of diagenesis. What remains is often a carbonaceous film known as a phytoleim, in which case the fossil is known as a compression. Often, however, the phytoleim is lost and all that remains is an impression of the organism in the rock—an impression fossil. In many cases, however, compressions and impressions occur together. For instance, when the rock is broken open, the phytoleim will often be attached to one part (compression), whereas the counterpart will just be an impression. For this reason, one term covers the two modes of preservation: adpression.

==== Carbonization and coalification ====
Fossils that are carbonized or coalified consist of the organic remains which have been reduced primarily to the chemical element carbon. Carbonized fossils consist of a thin film which forms a silhouette of the original organism, and the original organic remains were typically soft tissues. Coalified fossils consist primarily of coal, and the original organic remains were typically woody in composition.

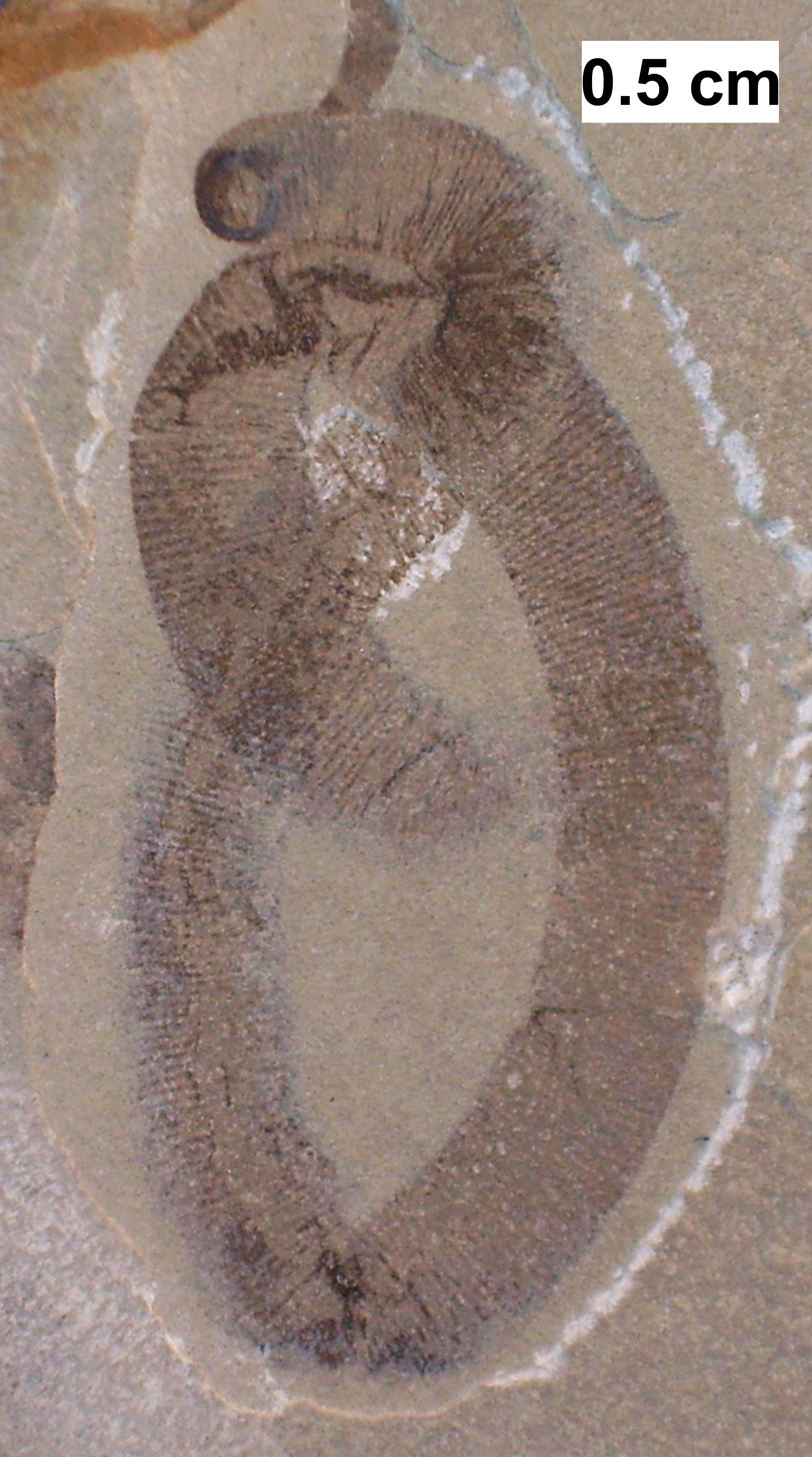
Carbonized fossil of a cycloneuralian worm that was once misidentified as a leech from the Silurian Waukesha Biota of Wisconsin.

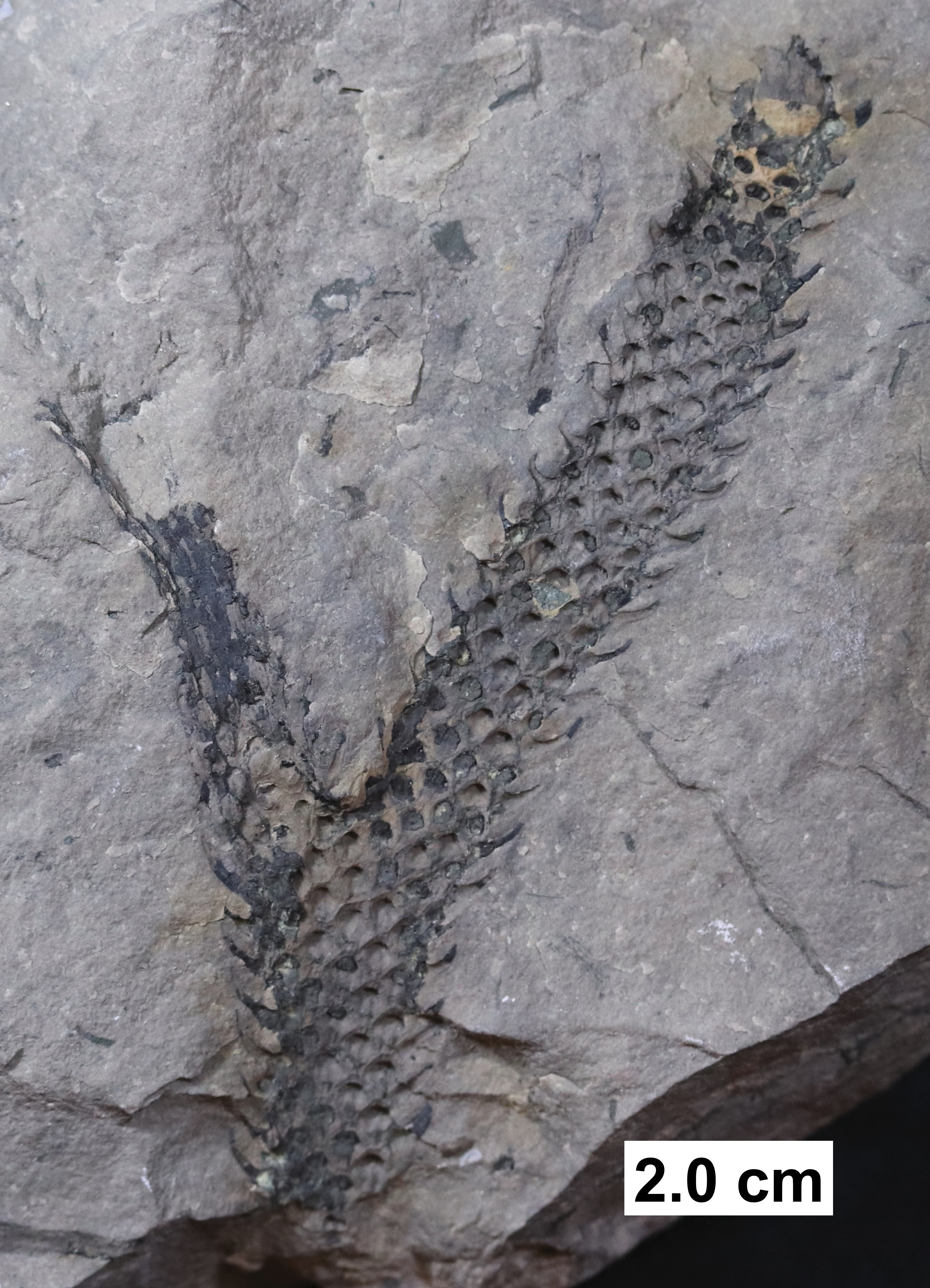
Partially coalified axis (branch) of a lycopod from the Devonian of Wisconsin.

=== Soft tissue, cell and molecular preservation ===
Because of their antiquity, an unexpected exception to the alteration of an organism's tissues by chemical reduction of the complex organic molecules during fossilization has been the discovery of soft tissue in dinosaur fossils, including blood vessels, and the isolation of proteins and evidence for DNA fragments. In 2014, Mary Schweitzer and her colleagues reported the presence of iron particles (goethite-aFeO(OH)) associated with soft tissues recovered from dinosaur fossils. Based on various experiments that studied the interaction of iron in haemoglobin with blood vessel tissue they proposed that solution hypoxia coupled with iron chelation enhances the stability and preservation of soft tissue and provides the basis for an explanation for the unforeseen preservation of fossil soft tissues. However, a slightly older study based on eight taxa ranging in time from the Devonian to the Jurassic found that reasonably well-preserved fibrils that probably represent collagen were preserved in all these fossils and that the quality of preservation depended mostly on the arrangement of the collagen fibers, with tight packing favoring good preservation. There seemed to be no correlation between geological age and quality of preservation, within that timeframe.

=== Bioimmuration ===
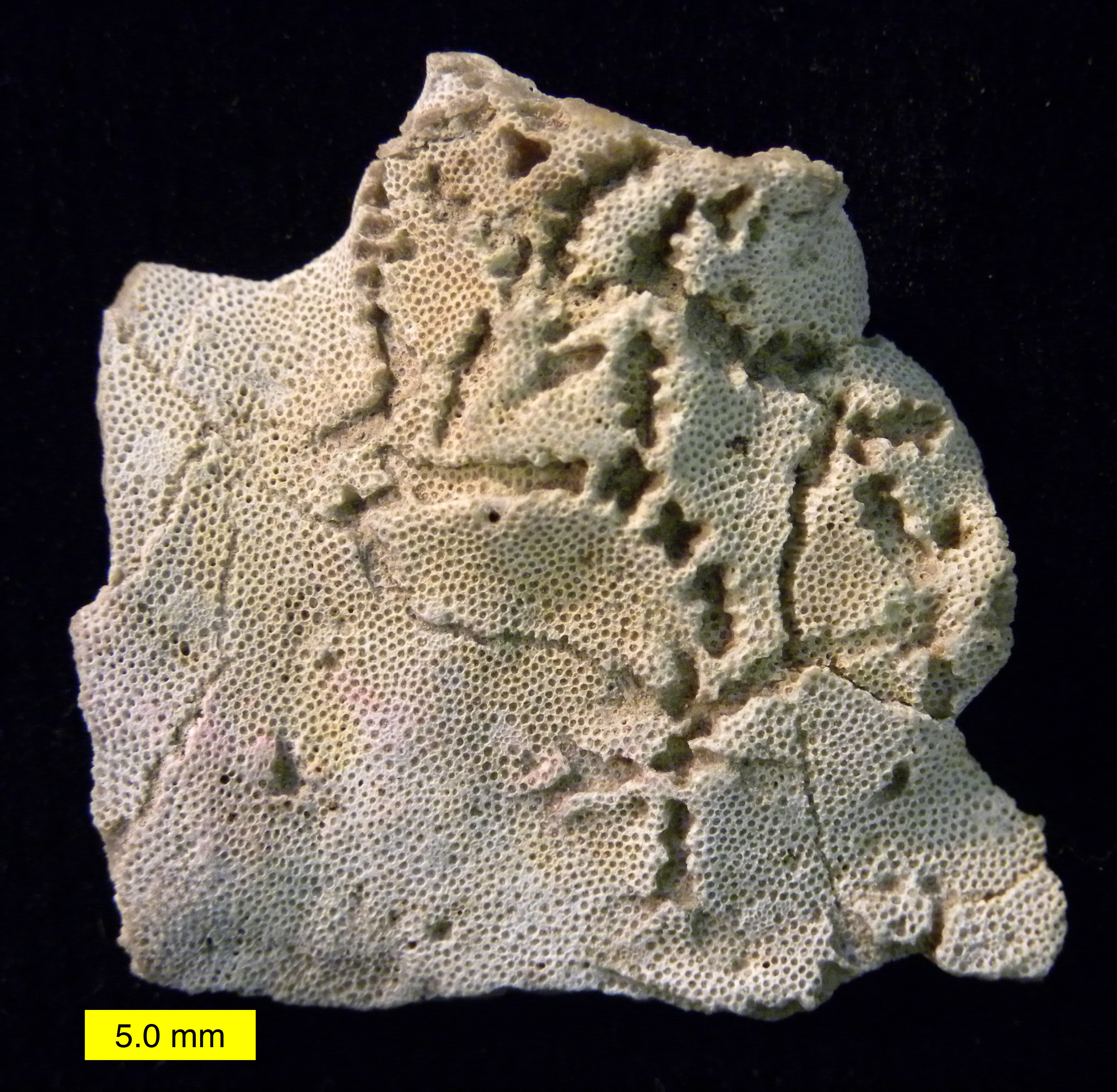
The star-shaped holes (Catellocaula vallata) in this Upper Ordovician bryozoan represent a soft-bodied organism preserved by bioimmuration in the bryozoan skeleton.

Bioimmuration occurs when a skeletal organism overgrows or otherwise subsumes another organism, preserving the latter, or an impression of it, within the skeleton. Usually it is a sessile skeletal organism, such as a bryozoan or an oyster, which grows along a substrate, covering other sessile sclerobionts. Sometimes the bioimmured organism is soft-bodied and is then preserved in negative relief as a kind of external mold. There are also cases where an organism settles on top of a living skeletal organism that grows upwards, preserving the settler in its skeleton. Bioimmuration is known in the fossil record from the Ordovician to the Recent.

== Types ==
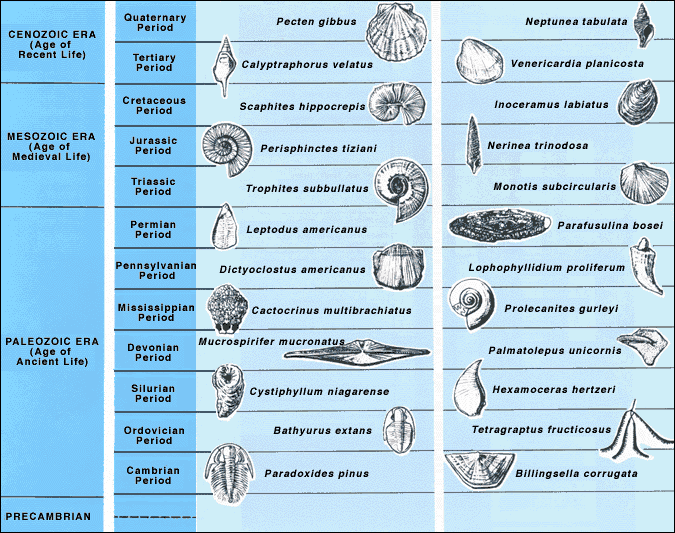
Examples of index fossils

=== Body fossils ===
A trilobite fossil

Body fossil (or fossils proper) are actual remains of an organism's physical body preserved with geological formations. The vast majority of body fossils are not of the whole organism, but only its most durable parts, most frequently mineralized tissues such as bones, teeths, shells and other exoskeletons. With better preservative conditions, body fossils may also include softer, less durable tissues such as skin, hairs/feathers, remnants of organs, leaves, flowers, fruits and seeds.

==== Microfossils ====
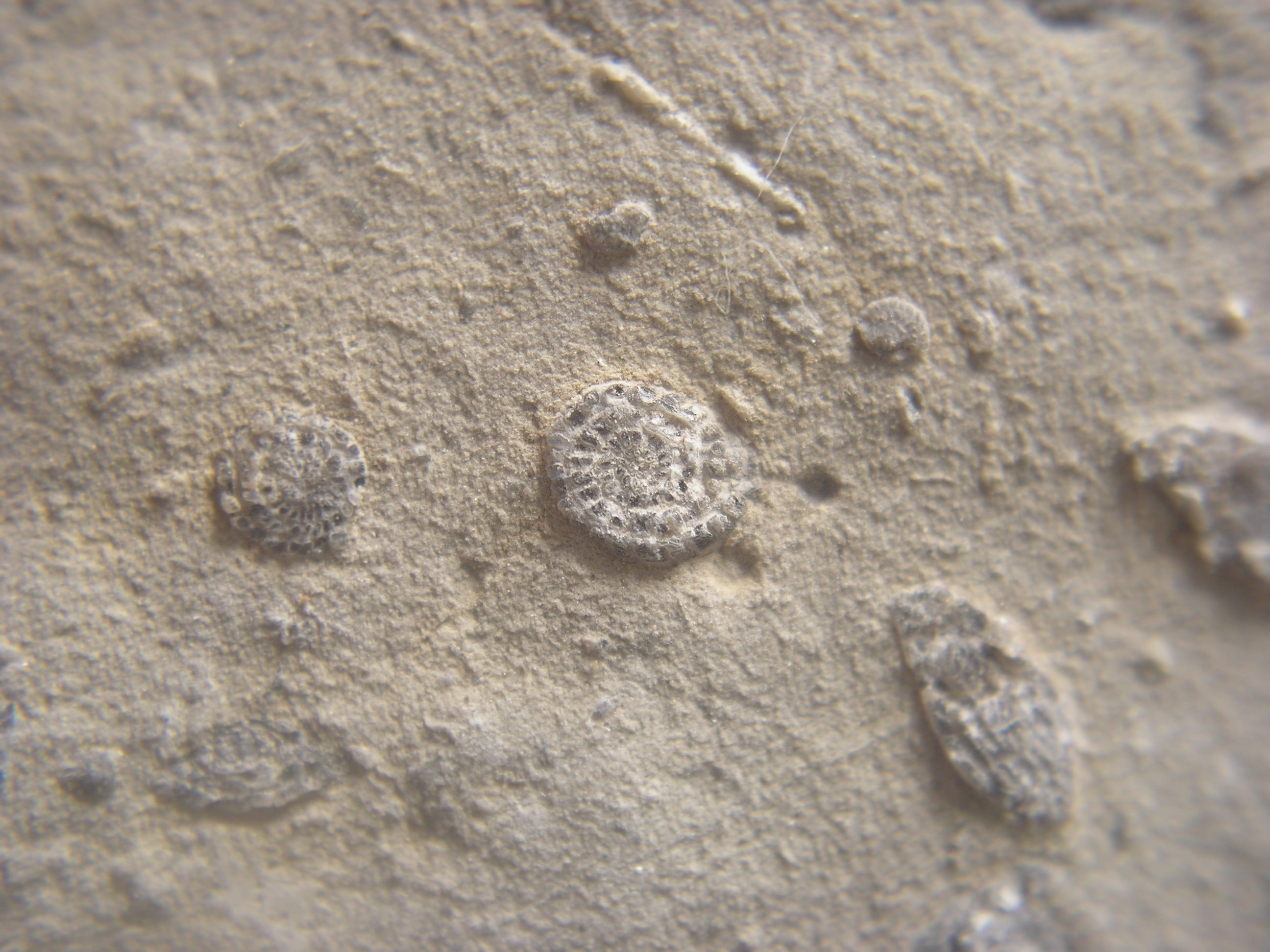
Microfossils about 1 mm

Microfossil is a descriptive term applied to fossilized plants and animals whose size is just at or below the level at which the fossil can be analyzed by the naked eye. A commonly applied cutoff point between "micro" and "macro" fossils is 1 mm. Microfossils may either be complete (or near-complete) organisms (such as the marine plankters foraminifera and coccolithophores) or component parts (such as small teeth or spores) of larger animals or plants. Microfossils are of critical importance as a reservoir of paleoclimate information, and are also commonly used by biostratigraphers to assist in the correlation of rock units.

==== Wood fossils ====
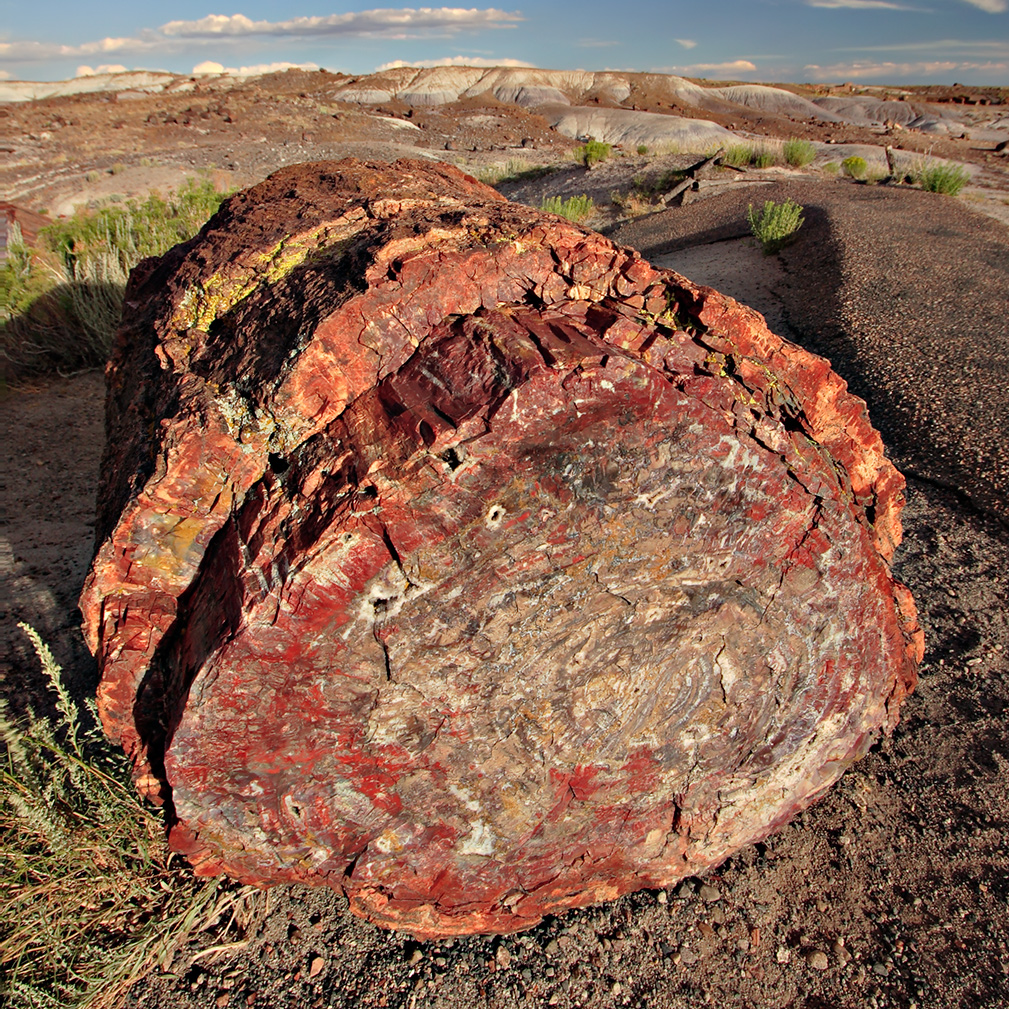
Petrified wood. The internal structure of the tree and bark are maintained in the permineralization process.

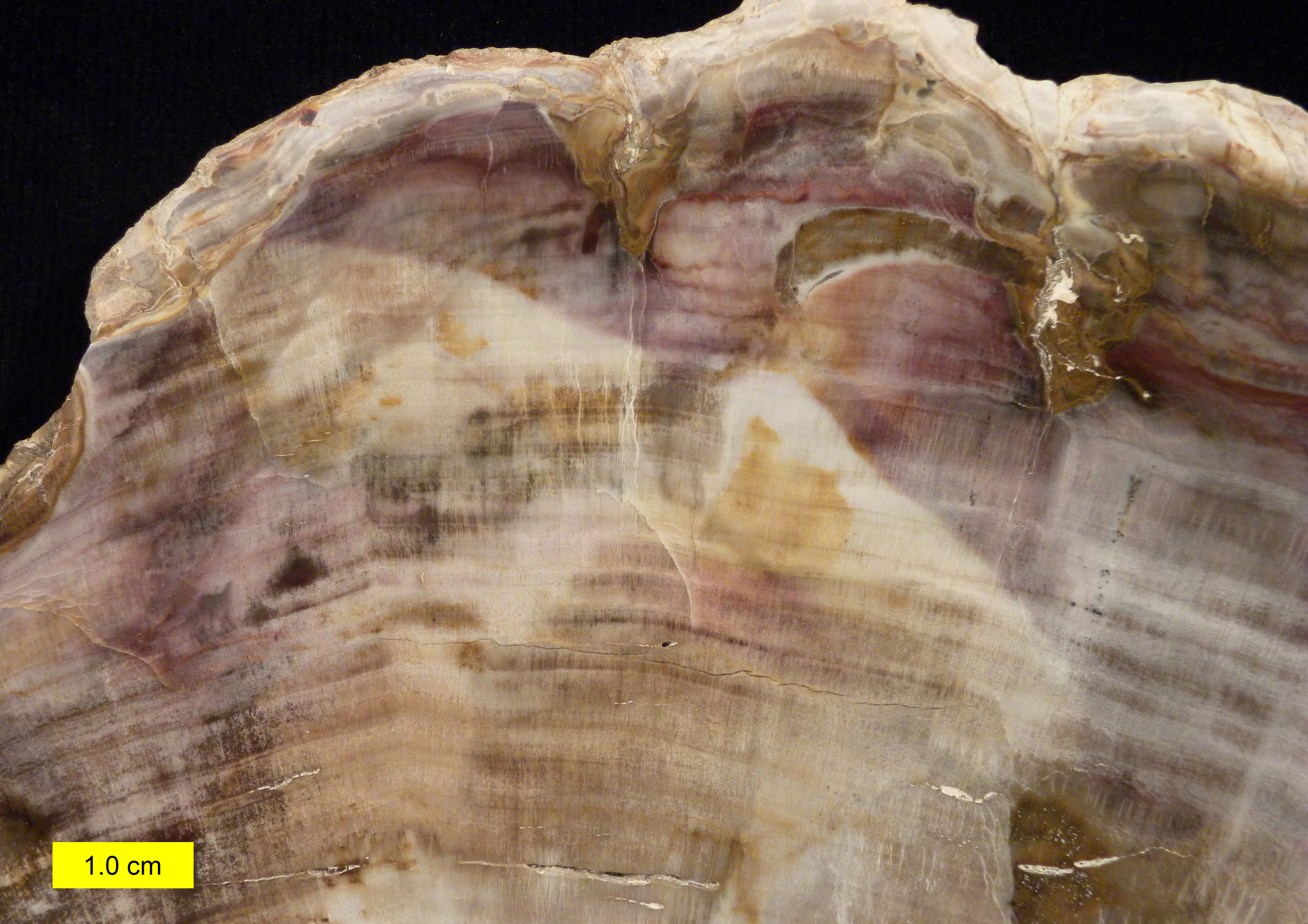
Polished section of petrified wood showing annual rings

Fossil wood is wood preserved in the fossil record. Wood, which is composed of lignin, is usually the most durable and thus preservable part of a plant. Fossil wood may or may not be petrified, and may be the only part of the plant that has been preserved; therefore such wood may get a special kind of botanical name. This will usually include "xylon" and a term indicating its presumed affinity, such as Araucarioxylon (wood of Araucaria or some related genus), Palmoxylon (wood of an indeterminate palm), or Castanoxylon (wood of an indeterminate chinkapin).

==== Resin inclusions ====
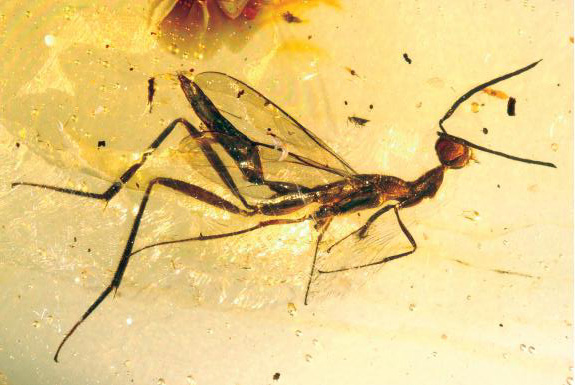
The wasp Leptofoenus pittfieldae trapped in Dominican amber, from 20 to 16 million years ago. It is known only from this specimen.

Fossilized resin (colloquially called amber) is a natural polymer found in many types of strata throughout the world, even the Arctic. The oldest fossil resin dates to the Triassic, though most dates to the Cenozoic. The excretion of resin by certain plants is thought to be an evolutionary adaptation to protect against insects and to seal wounds. Fossil resin often contains other fossils, called inclusions, that were adhesively trapped by the resin. These include bacteria, fungi, other plants, and animals. Animal inclusions are usually small invertebrates, predominantly arthropods such as insects and spiders, and only extremely rarely a vertebrate such as a small lizard. Preservation of inclusions can be exquisite, including small fragments of DNA.

=== Mold fossils ===
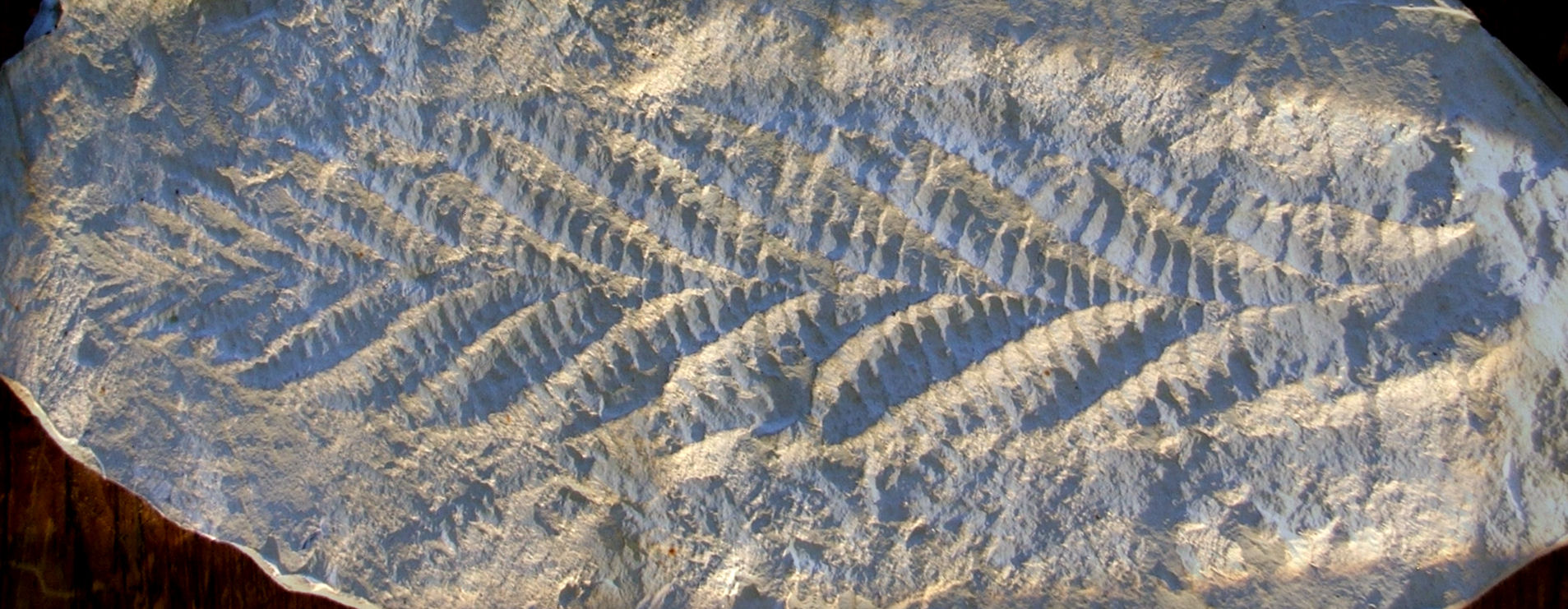
The mold fossil of Charnia, a soft-bodied rangeomorph of the Ediacaran biota

Mold fossils are hollow imprints or negative spaces left in sediment or rock when the buried remains of an organism dissolve and decay completely over time. Soft-bodied organisms, unless buried under exception preservative conditions, generally rot away and leave only mold impressions in the surrounding sediments.

=== Trace fossils ===
Trace fossils are fossil records of biological activity by lifeforms but not the preserved remains of the organism itself. They consist mainly of tracks and burrows, but also include coprolites (fossil feces) and marks left by feeding. Trace fossils are particularly significant because they represent a data source that is not limited to animals with easily fossilized hard parts, and they reflect animal behaviours. Many traces date from significantly earlier than the body fossils of animals that are thought to have been capable of making them. Whilst exact assignment of trace fossils to their makers is generally impossible, traces may for example provide the earliest physical evidence of the appearance of moderately complex animals (comparable to earthworms).

Coprolites are classified as trace fossils as opposed to body fossils, as they give evidence for the animal's behaviour (in this case, diet) rather than morphology. They were first described by William Buckland in 1829. Prior to this they were known as "fossil fir cones" and "bezoar stones." They serve a valuable purpose in paleontology because they provide direct evidence of the predation and diet of extinct organisms. Coprolites may range in size from a few millimetres to over 60 centimetres.

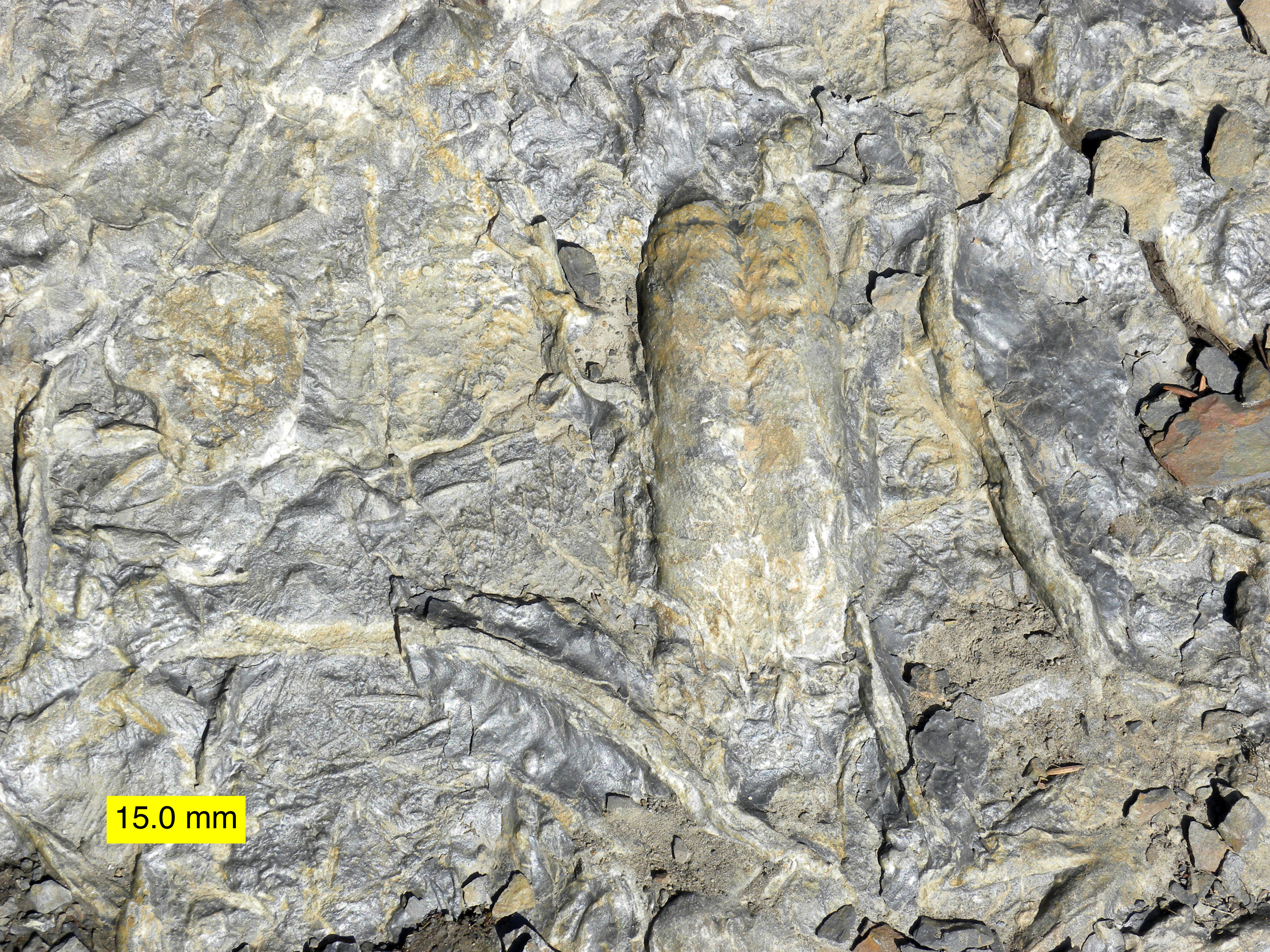
Cambrian trace fossils including Rusophycus, made by a trilobite

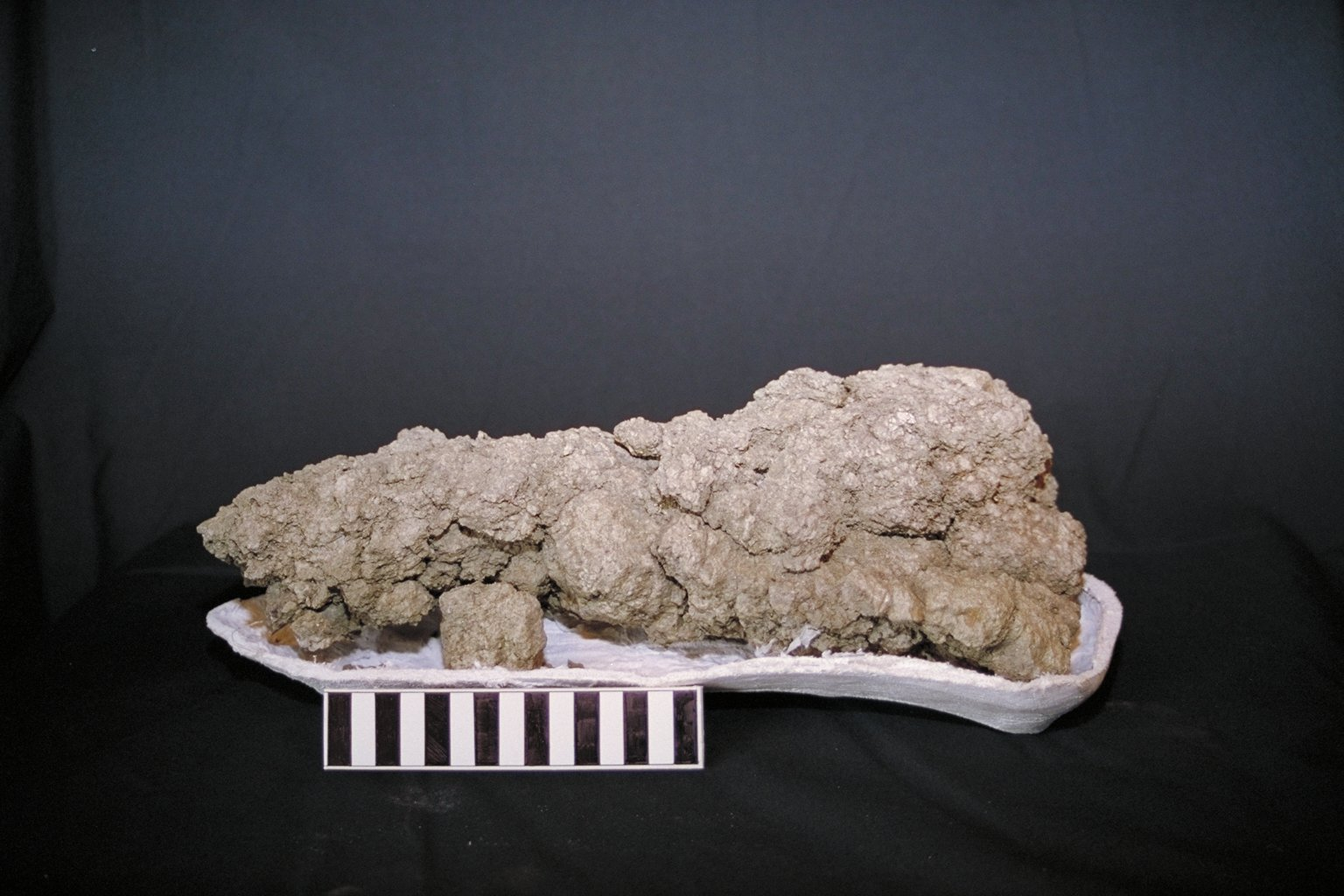
A coprolite of a carnivorous dinosaur found in southwestern Saskatchewan

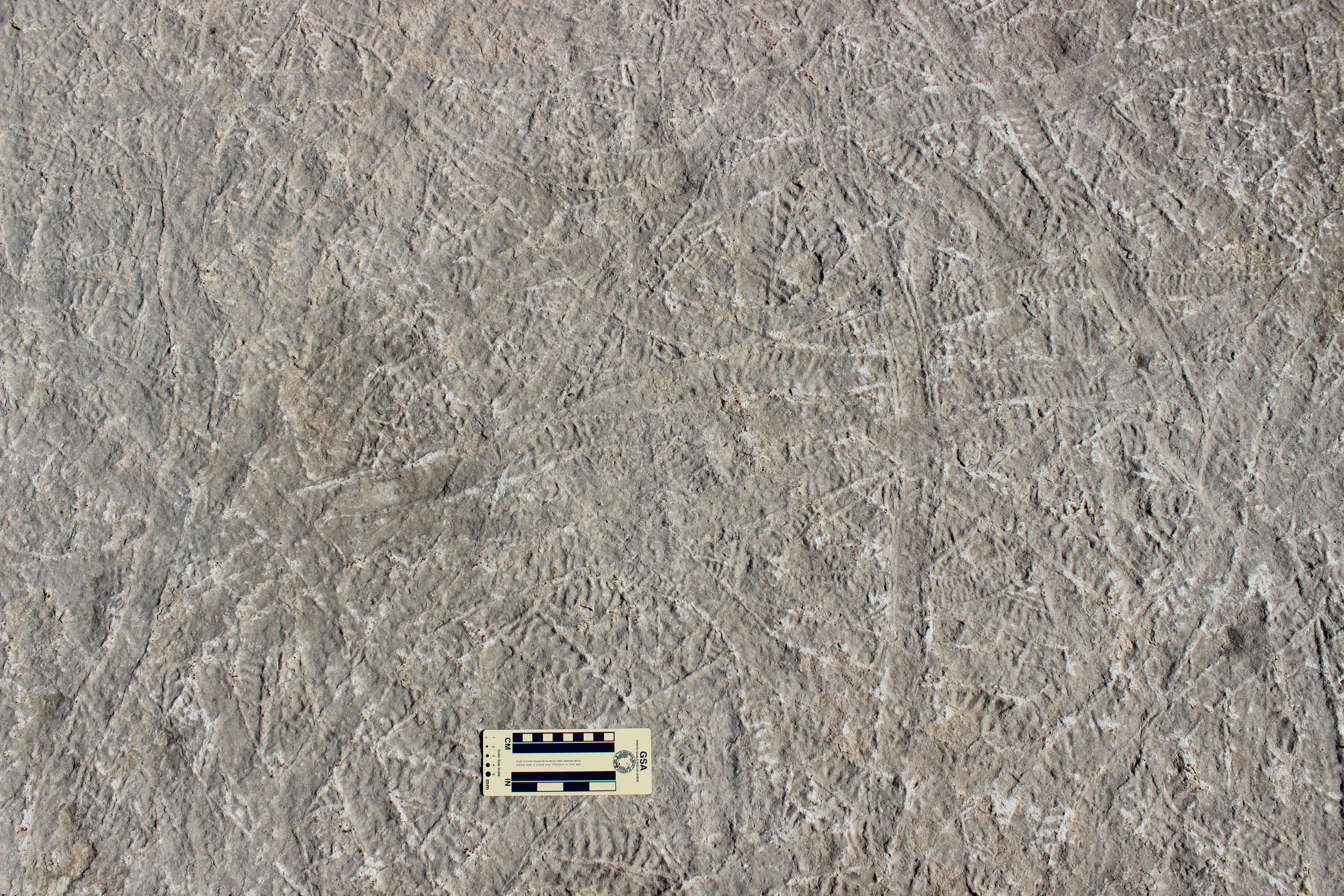
Densely packed, subaerial or nearshore trackways (Climactichnites wilsoni) made by a putative, slug-like mollusk on a Cambrian tidal flat

=== Chemical fossils ===
Chemical fossils, or chemofossils, are chemical remnants found in rocks and fossil fuels (petroleum, coal, and natural gas) that provide an organic signature for ancient life. Molecular fossils and isotope ratios represent two types of chemical fossils. The oldest traces of life on Earth are fossils of this type, including carbon isotope anomalies found in zircons that imply the existence of life as early as 4.1 billion years ago.

=== Other concepts ===
==== Index fossils ====
Index fossils (also known as guide fossils, indicator fossils or zone fossils) are fossils used to define and identify geologic periods (or faunal stages). They work on the premise that, although different sediments may look different depending on the conditions under which they were deposited, they may include the remains of the same species of fossil. The shorter the species' time range, the more precisely different sediments can be correlated, and so rapidly evolving species' fossils are particularly useful as index fossils. The best index fossils are common, easy to identify at species level and have a broad distribution—otherwise the likelihood of finding and recognizing one in the two sediments is poor.

==== Transitional fossils ====
A transitional fossil is any fossilized remains of a life form that exhibits traits common to both an ancestral group and its derived descendant group. This is especially important where the descendant group is sharply differentiated by gross anatomy and mode of living from the ancestral group. Because of the incompleteness of the fossil record, there is usually no way to know exactly how close a transitional fossil is to the point of divergence. These fossils serve as a reminder that taxonomic divisions are human constructs that have been imposed in hindsight on a continuum of variation.

==== Subfossils ====
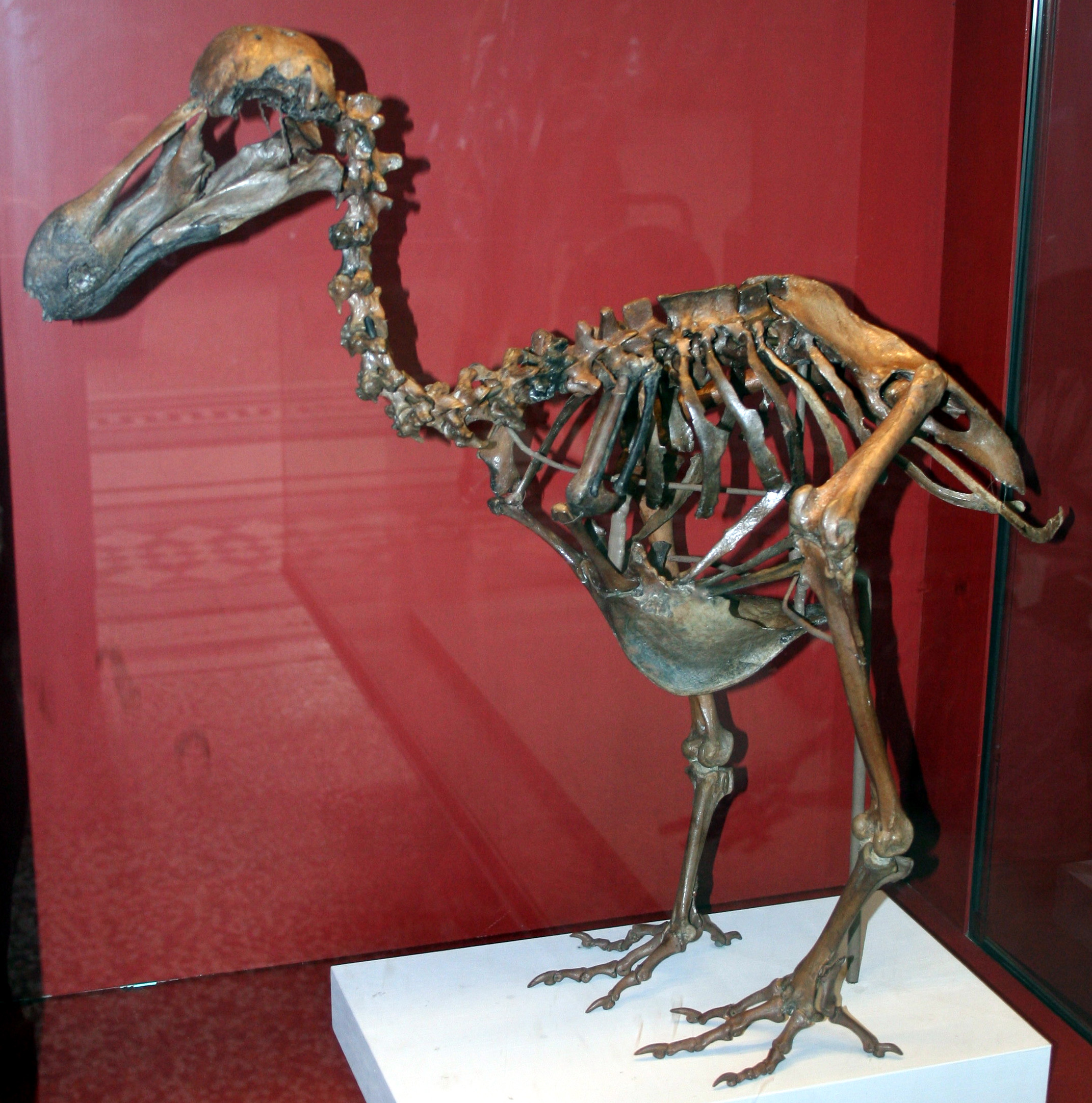
A subfossil dodo skeleton

Subfossils are remains from the Holocene that are too old to be considered modern. Unmineralized remains from previous geological ages are often erroneously called subfossils. Fossils however may consist of relatively unaltered material such as that of mollusks or amber. Subfossil material may also be mineralized remains of Holocene age. Subfossils are often found in caves or other shelters where they can be preserved for thousands of years.

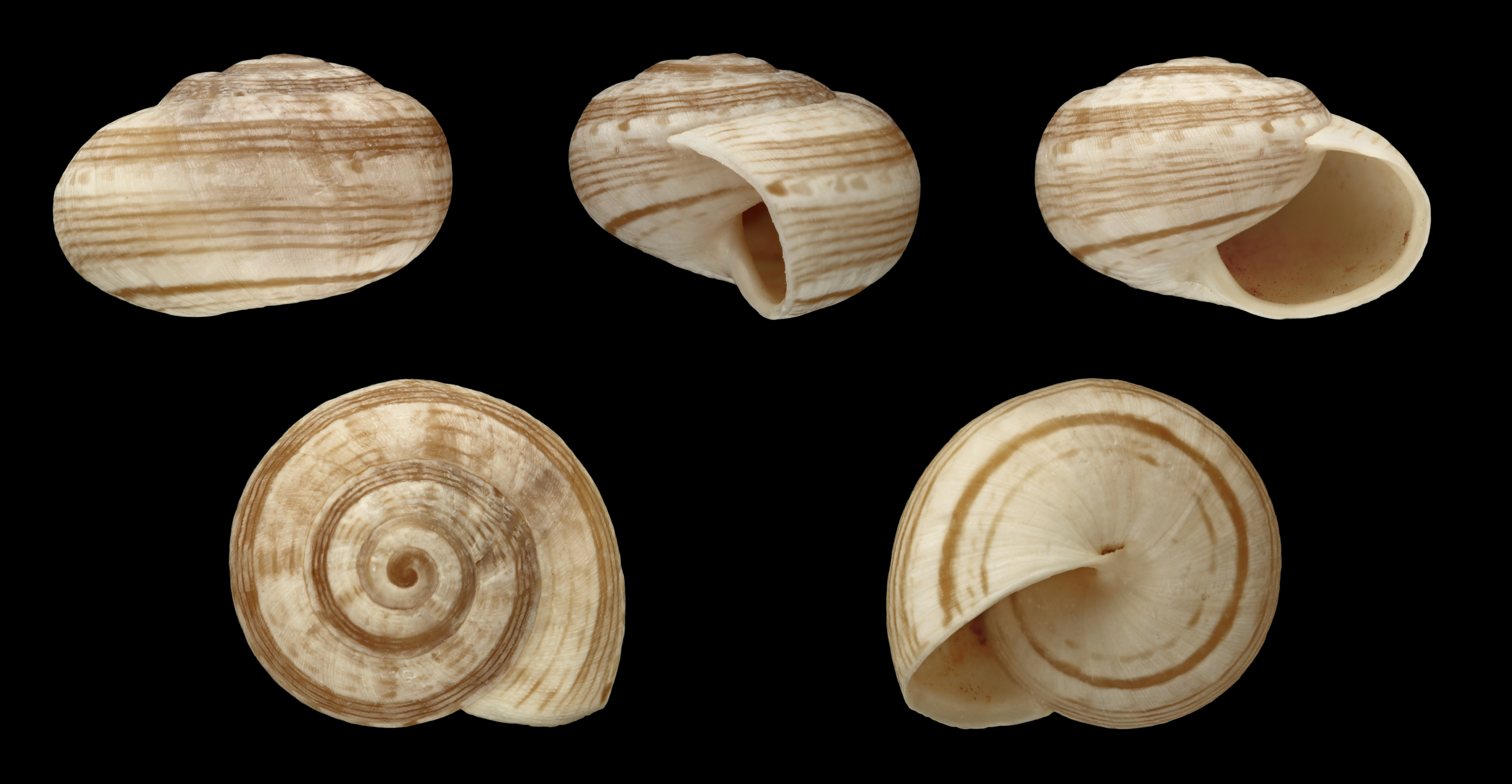
Subfossil Theba geminata

Subfossils are often found in recent depositionary environments, such as lake sediments, oceanic sediments, and soils. Once deposited, physical and chemical weathering can alter the state of preservation, and small subfossils can also be ingested by living organisms. Subfossils commonly include chironomid head capsules, ostracod carapaces, diatoms, and foraminifera.

==== Derived/reworked fossils ====
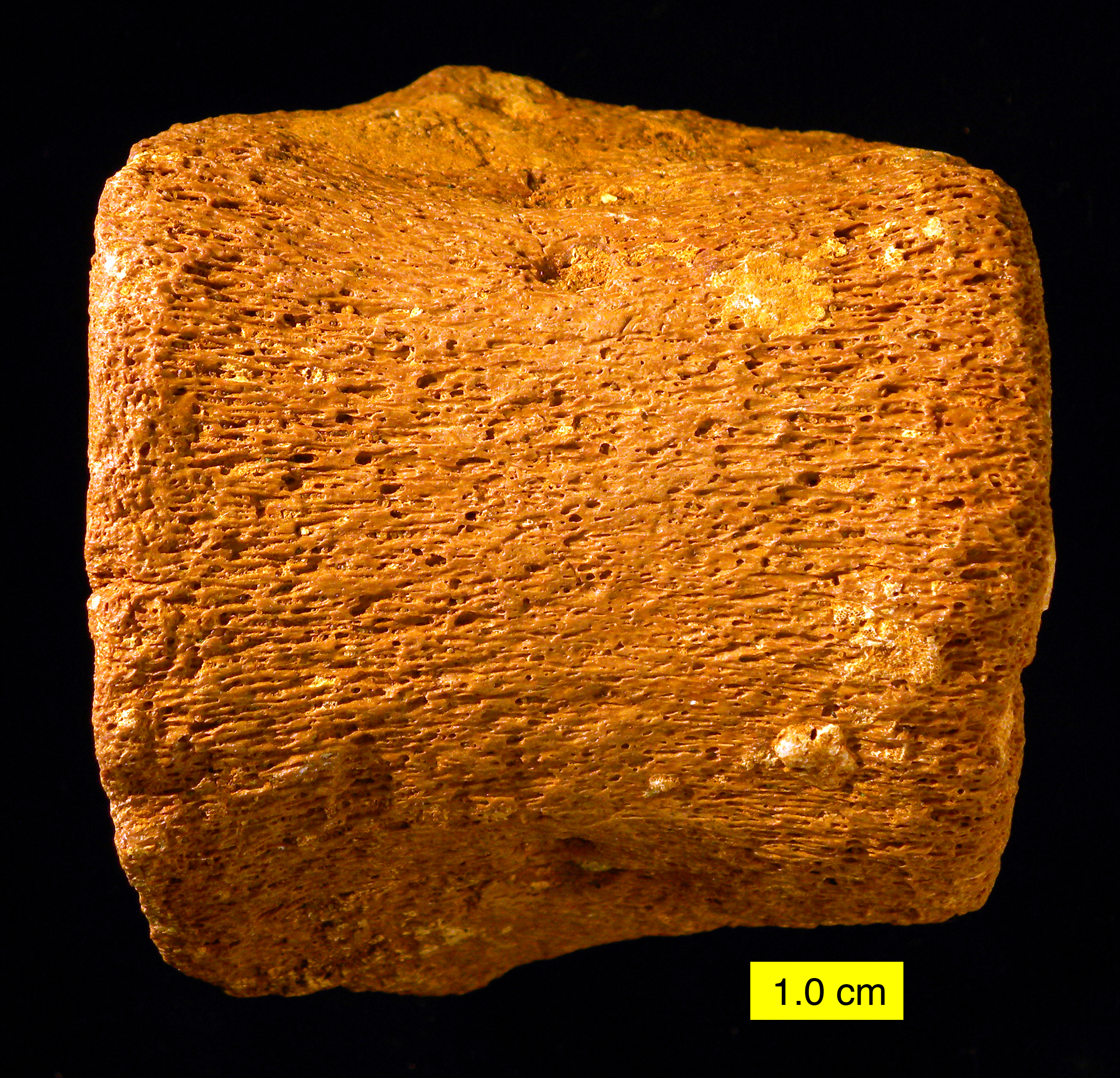
Eroded Jurassic plesiosaur vertebral centrum found in the Lower Cretaceous Faringdon Sponge Gravels in Faringdon, England. An example of a remanié fossil.

A derived, reworked or remanié fossil is a fossil found in rock that accumulated significantly later than when the fossilized animal or plant died. Reworked fossils are created by erosion exhuming (freeing) fossils from the rock formation in which they were originally deposited and redepositing them in a younger sedimentary deposit.

== Stromatolites ==
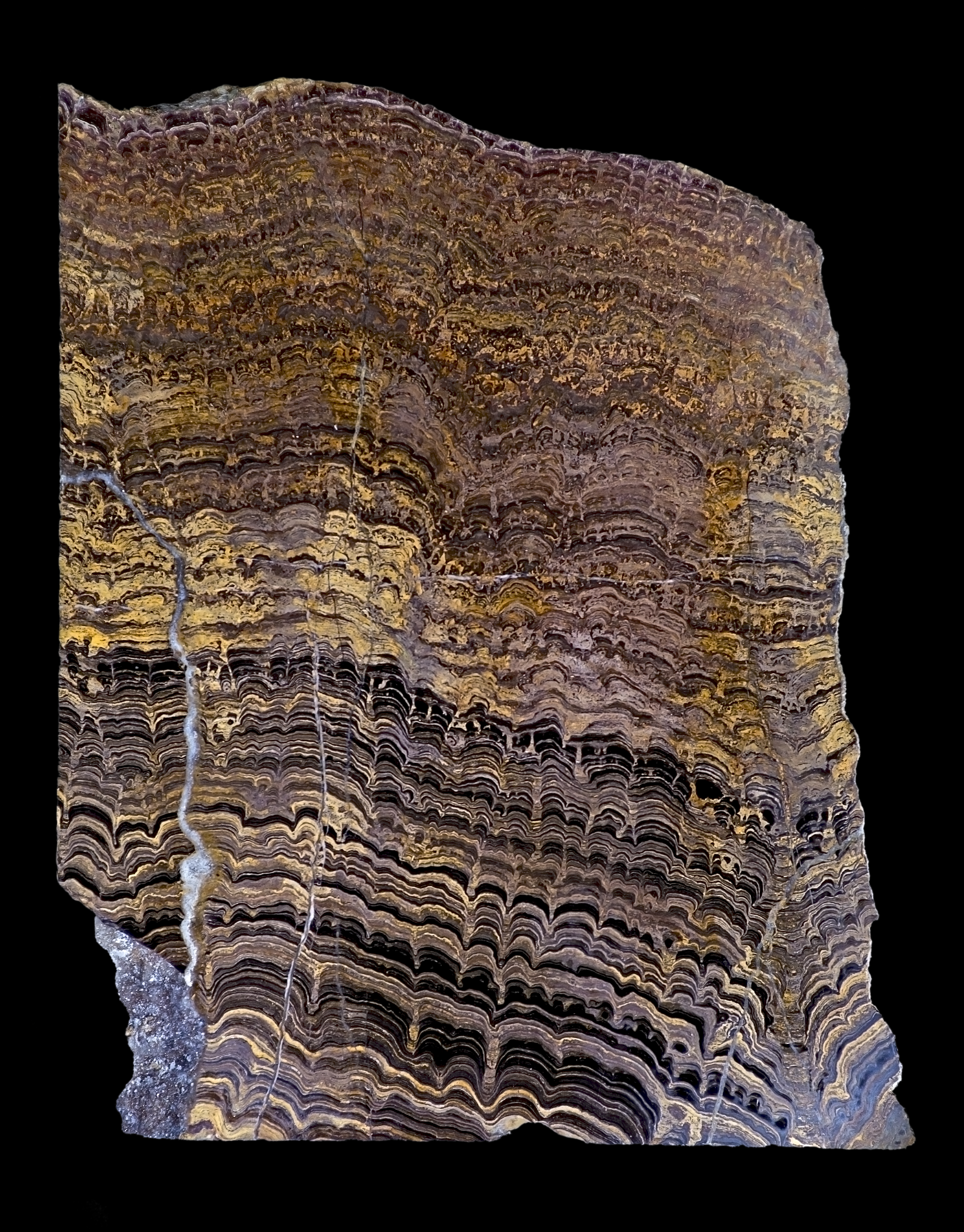
Lower Proterozoic stromatolites from Bolivia, South America

Stromatolites are layered accretionary structures formed in shallow water by the trapping, binding and cementation of sedimentary grains by biofilms of microorganisms, especially cyanobacteria. Stromatolites provide some of the most ancient fossil records of life on Earth, dating back more than 3.5 billion years ago.

Stromatolites were much more abundant in Precambrian times. While older, Archean fossil remains are presumed to be colonies of cyanobacteria, younger (that is, Proterozoic) fossils may be primordial forms of the eukaryote chlorophytes (that is, green algae). One genus of stromatolite very common in the geologic record is Collenia. The earliest stromatolite of confirmed microbial origin dates to 2.724 billion years ago.

A 2009 discovery provides strong evidence of microbial stromatolites extending as far back as 3.45 billion years ago.

Stromatolites are a major constituent of the fossil record for life's first 3.5 billion years, peaking about 1.25 billion years ago. They subsequently declined in abundance and diversity, which by the start of the Cambrian had fallen to 20% of their peak. The most widely supported explanation is that stromatolite builders fell victims to grazing creatures (the Cambrian substrate revolution), implying that sufficiently complex organisms were common over 1 billion years ago.

The connection between grazer and stromatolite abundance is well documented in the younger Ordovician evolutionary radiation; stromatolite abundance also increased after the end-Ordovician and end-Permian extinctions decimated marine animals, falling back to earlier levels as marine animals recovered. Fluctuations in metazoan population and diversity may not have been the only factor in the reduction in stromatolite abundance. Factors such as the chemistry of the environment may have been responsible for changes.

While prokaryotic cyanobacteria themselves reproduce asexually through cell division, they were instrumental in priming the environment for the evolutionary development of more complex eukaryotic organisms. Cyanobacteria (as well as extremophile Gammaproteobacteria) are thought to be largely responsible for increasing the amount of oxygen in the primeval Earth's atmosphere through their continuing photosynthesis. Cyanobacteria use water, carbon dioxide and sunlight to create their food. A layer of mucus often forms over mats of cyanobacterial cells. In modern microbial mats, debris from the surrounding habitat can become trapped within the mucus, which can be cemented by the calcium carbonate to grow thin laminations of limestone. These laminations can accrete over time, resulting in the banded pattern common to stromatolites. The domal morphology of biological stromatolites is the result of the vertical growth necessary for the continued infiltration of sunlight to the organisms for photosynthesis. Layered spherical growth structures termed oncolites are similar to stromatolites and are also known from the fossil record. Thrombolites are poorly laminated or non-laminated clotted structures formed by cyanobacteria common in the fossil record and in modern sediments.

The Zebra River Canyon area of the Kubis platform in the deeply dissected Zaris Mountains of southwestern Namibia provides an extremely well exposed example of the thrombolite-stromatolite-metazoan reefs that developed during the Proterozoic period, the stromatolites here being better developed in updip locations under conditions of higher current velocities and greater sediment influx.

== Pseudofossils ==
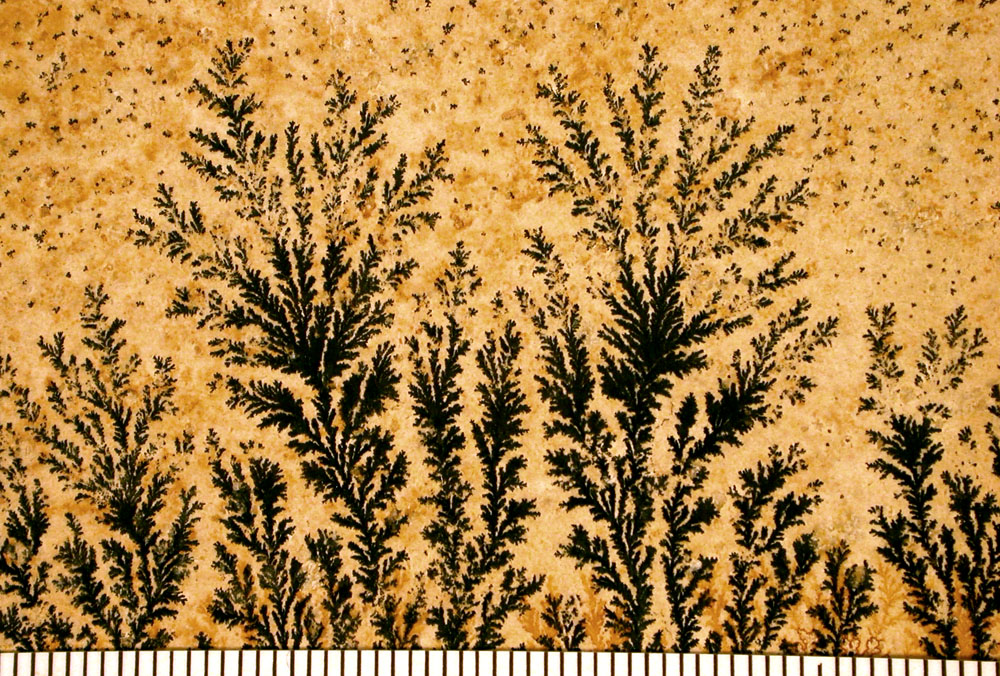
An example of a pseudofossil: Manganese dendrites on a limestone bedding plane from Solnhofen, Germany; scale in mm

Pseudofossils are visual patterns in rocks that imitate fossils but are produced by geologic processes rather than biologic processes. Some pseudofossils, such as geological dendrite crystals, are formed by naturally occurring fissures in the rock that get filled up by percolating minerals. Other types of pseudofossils are kidney ore (round shapes in iron ore) and moss agates, which look like moss or plant leaves. Concretions, spherical or ovoid-shaped nodules found in some sedimentary strata, were once thought to be dinosaur eggs and are often mistaken for fossils as well.

== Astrobiology ==
It has been suggested that biominerals could be important indicators of extraterrestrial life and thus could play an important role in the search for past or present life on the planet Mars. Furthermore, organic components (biosignatures) that are often associated with biominerals are believed to play crucial roles in both pre-biotic and biotic reactions.

On 24 January 2014, NASA reported that current studies by the Curiosity and Opportunity rovers on Mars would begin searching for evidence of ancient life, including a biosphere based on autotrophic, chemotrophic and/or chemolithoautotrophic microorganisms, as well as ancient water, including fluvio-lacustrine environments (plains related to ancient rivers or lakes) that may have been habitable. The search for evidence of habitability, taphonomy (related to fossils), and organic carbon on the planet Mars is now a primary NASA objective.

== Art ==
According to one hypothesis, a Corinthian vase from the 6th century BCE (Boston 63.420) is the oldest artistic record of a vertebrate fossil, perhaps a Miocene giraffe combined with elements from other species. However, a later study by Julián Monge-Nájera using expert evaluations rejects this idea, because mammals do not have the eye bones shown on the painted monster. Monge-Nájera believes the morphology shown in the vase painting corresponds best to an extant varanid that would have been known to the Ancient Greeks.

== Trading and collecting ==
Fossil trading is the practice of buying and selling fossils. This is sometimes done illegally with material stolen from research sites, costing many important scientific specimens each year. Sometimes, fossils of significant scientific importance are found and traded legally at prices that research organizations cannot afford. Such fossils may be damaged in private ownership before they are ever available to researchers. The problem is common in China where many specimens have been stolen.

Fossil collecting (sometimes, in a non-scientific sense, fossil hunting) is the collection of fossils for scientific study, leisure, or profit. Amateur fossil collecting is the predecessor of modern paleontology and remains a practiced hobby to date. Professionals and amateurs alike collect fossils for their scientific value. Some amateur fossil collectors will donate scientifically significant specimens to research organizations.

== As medicine ==
The use of fossils to address health issues is rooted in traditional medicine and include the use of fossils as talismans. The specific fossil to use to alleviate or cure an illness is often based on its resemblance to the symptoms or affected organ (see sympathetic magic). The usefulness of fossils as medicine is almost entirely a placebo effect, though fossil material might conceivably have some antacid activity or supply some essential minerals. The use of dinosaur bones as "dragon bones" has persisted in Traditional Chinese medicine into modern times, with mid-Cretaceous dinosaur bones being consumed in Ruyang County during the early 21st century.

== Gallery ==
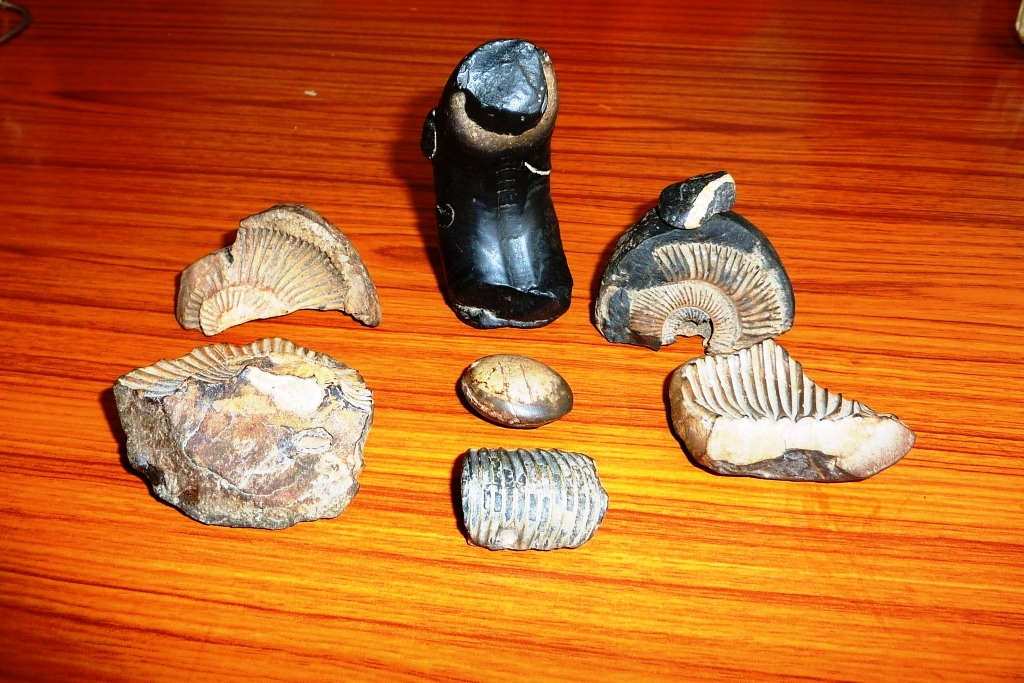
Marine fossils found high in the Himalayas. Collection of the Abbot of Dhankar Gompa, HP, India

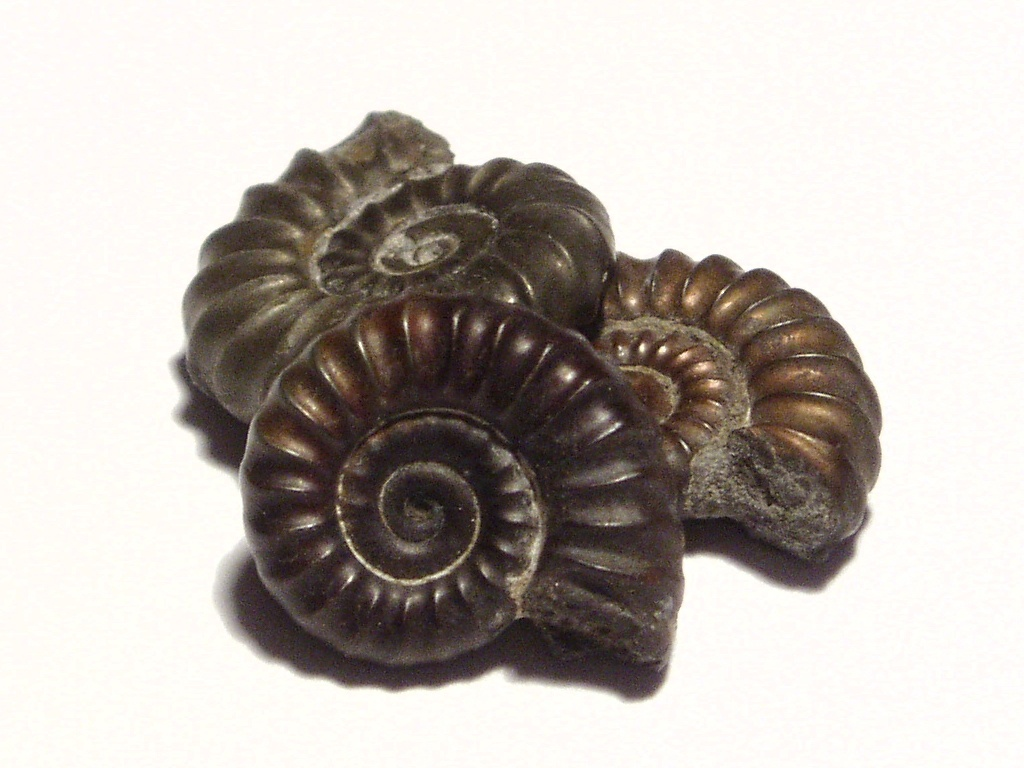
Three small ammonite fossils, each approximately 1.5 cm across

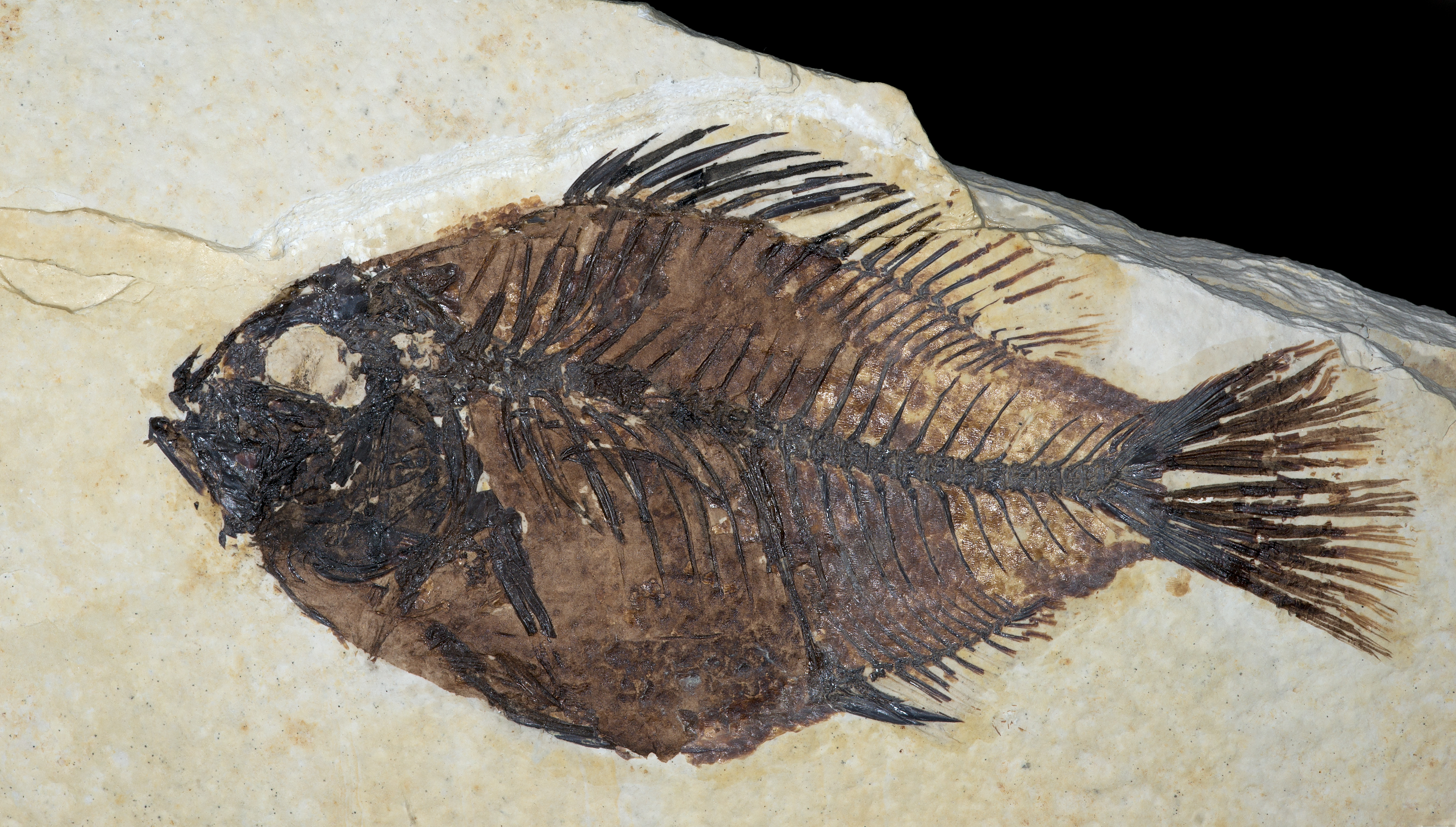
Eocene fossil fish Priscacara liops from the Green River Formation of Wyoming

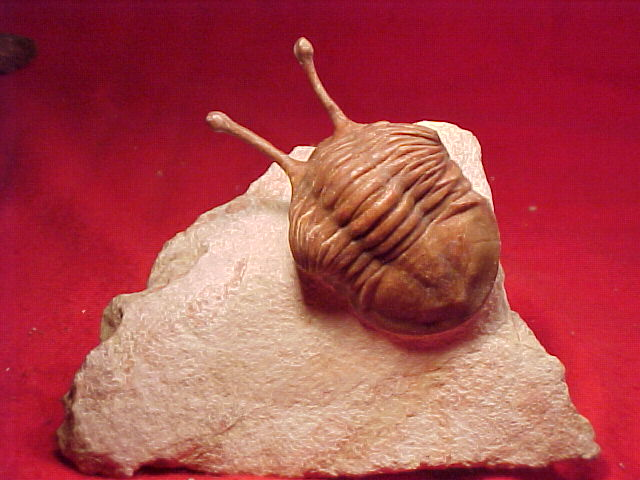
A permineralized trilobite, Asaphus kowalewskii

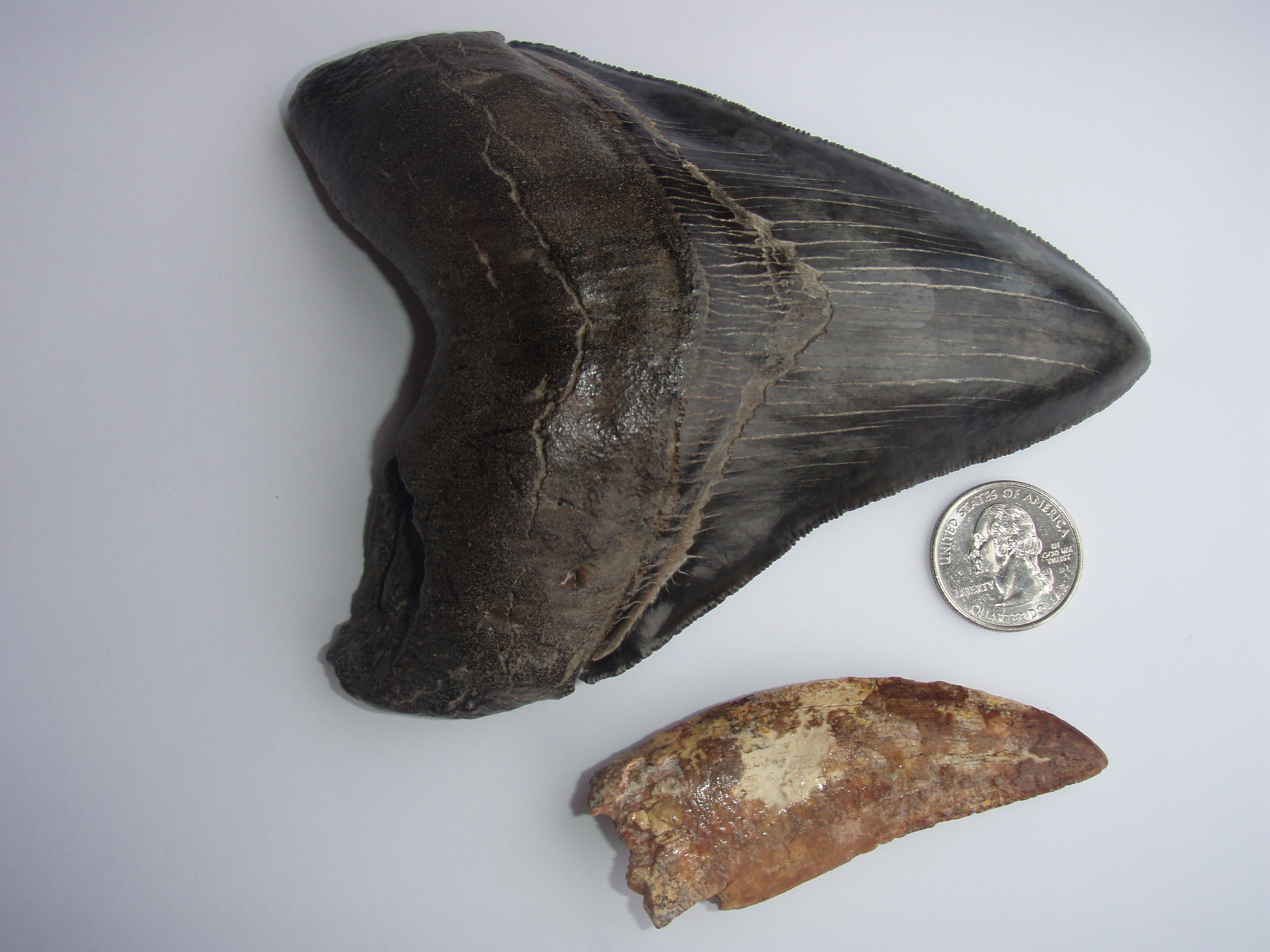
Megalodon and Carcharodontosaurus teeth. The latter was found in the Sahara Desert.

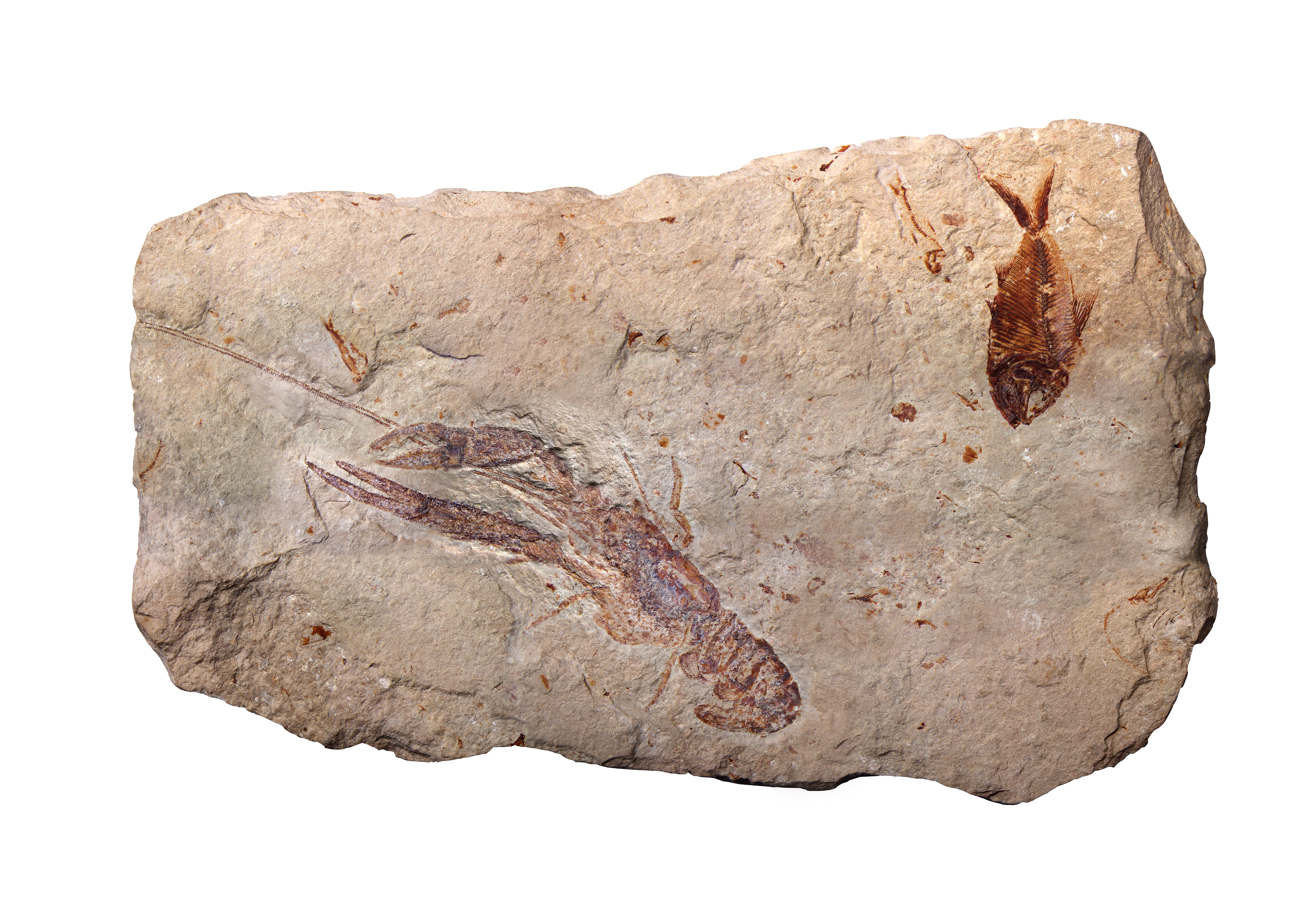
Fossil shrimp (Cretaceous)

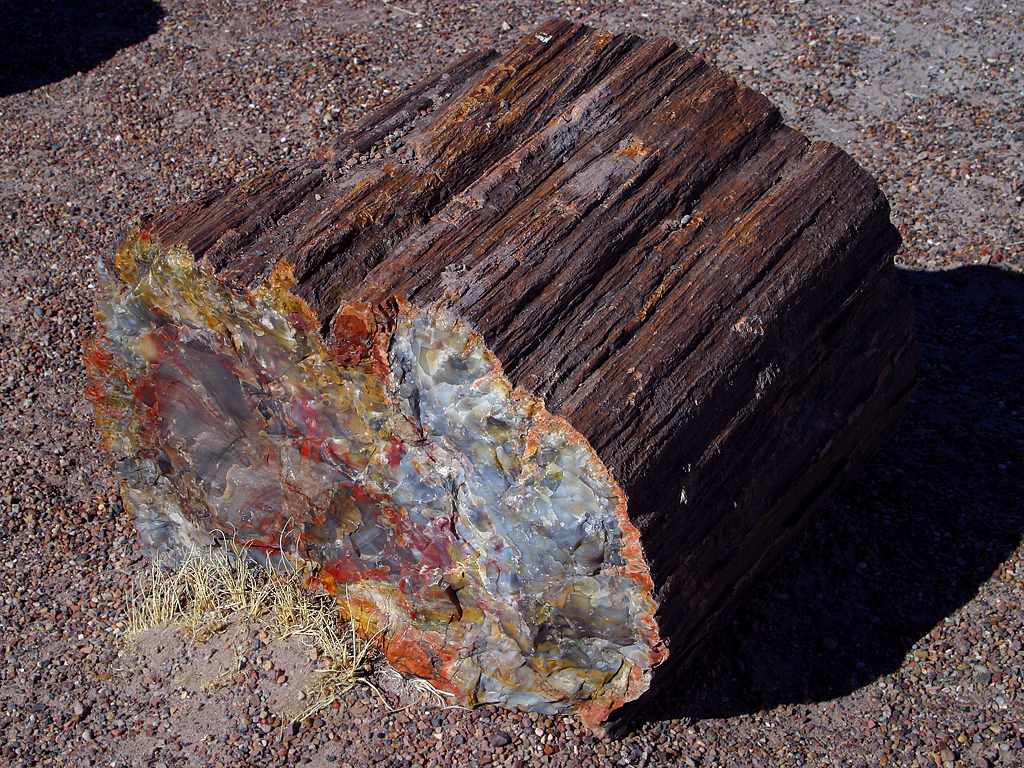
Petrified wood in Petrified Forest National Park, Arizona

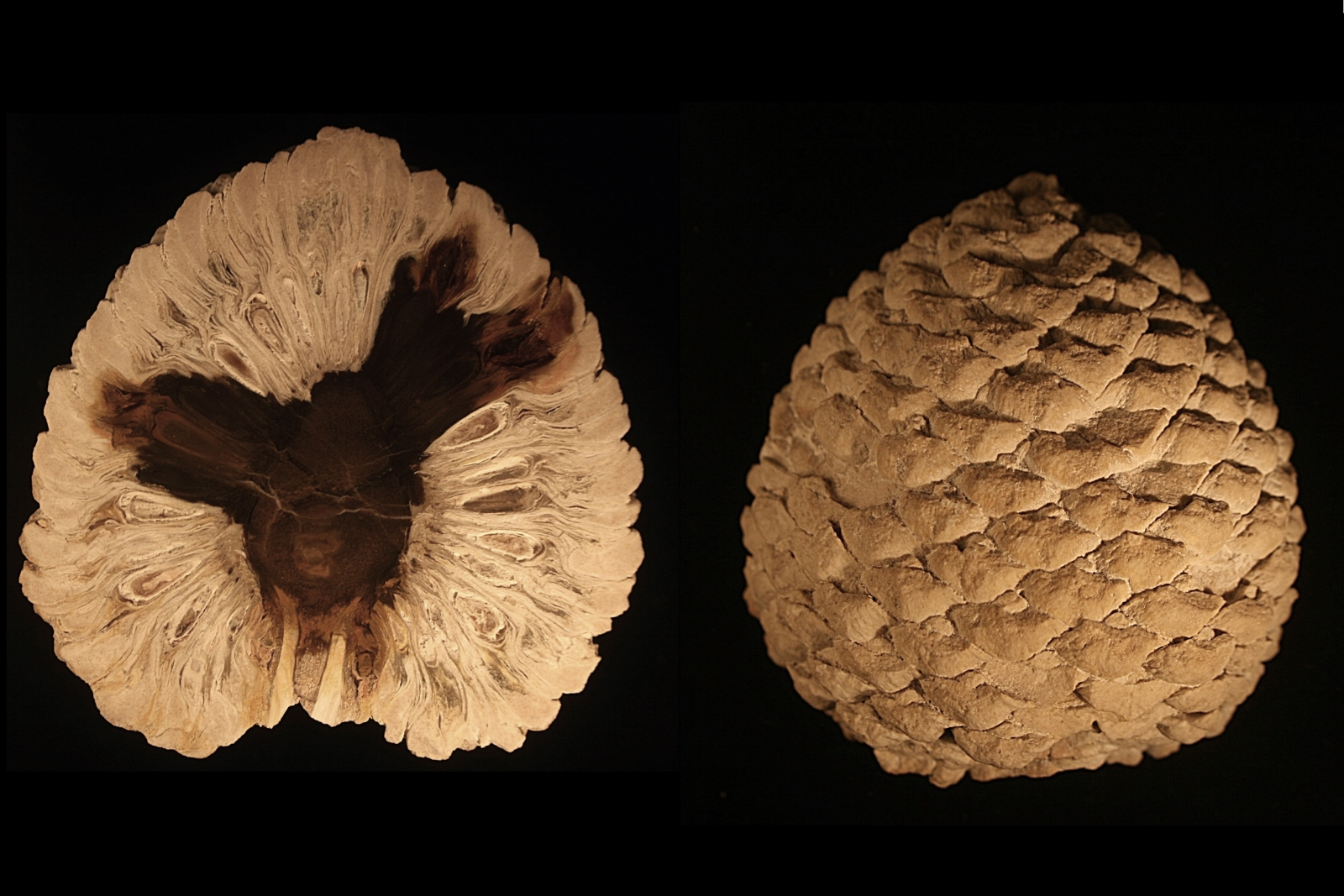
Petrified cone of Araucaria mirabilis from Patagonia, Argentina dating from the Jurassic Period (approx. 210 Ma)

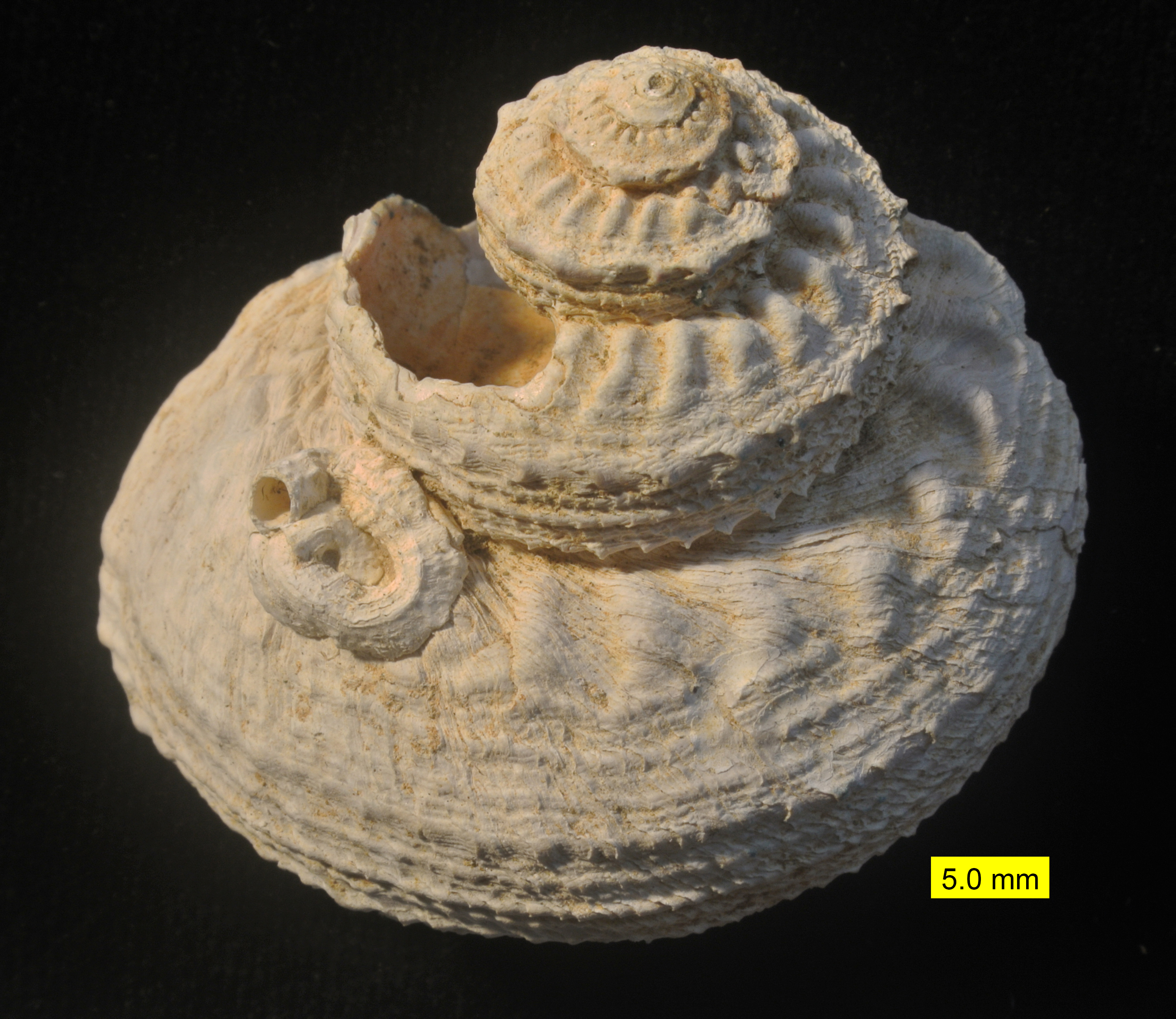
A fossil gastropod from the Pliocene of Cyprus. A serpulid worm is attached.

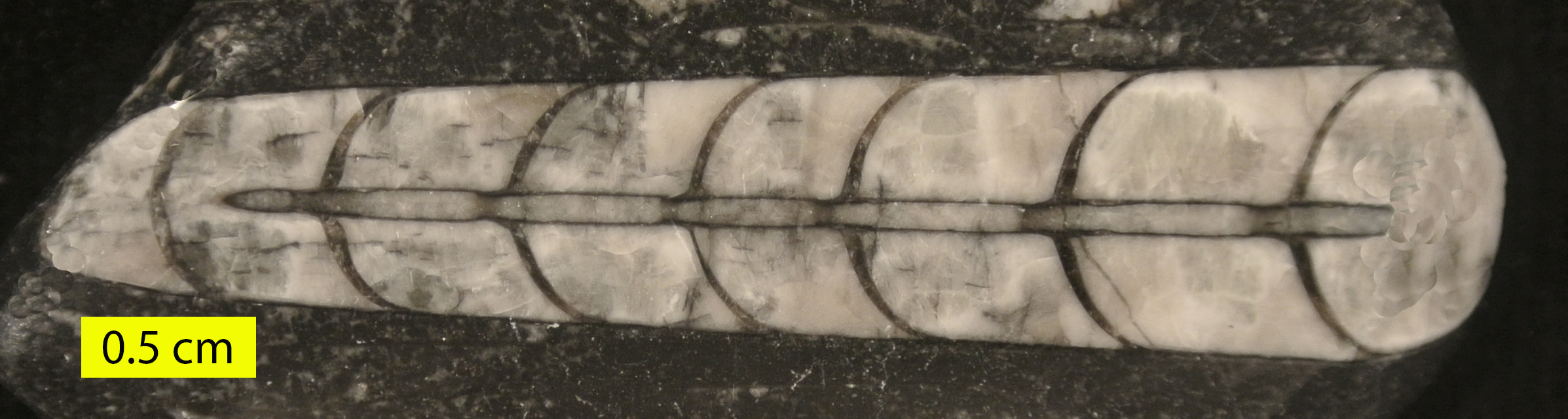
Silurian Orthoceras fossil

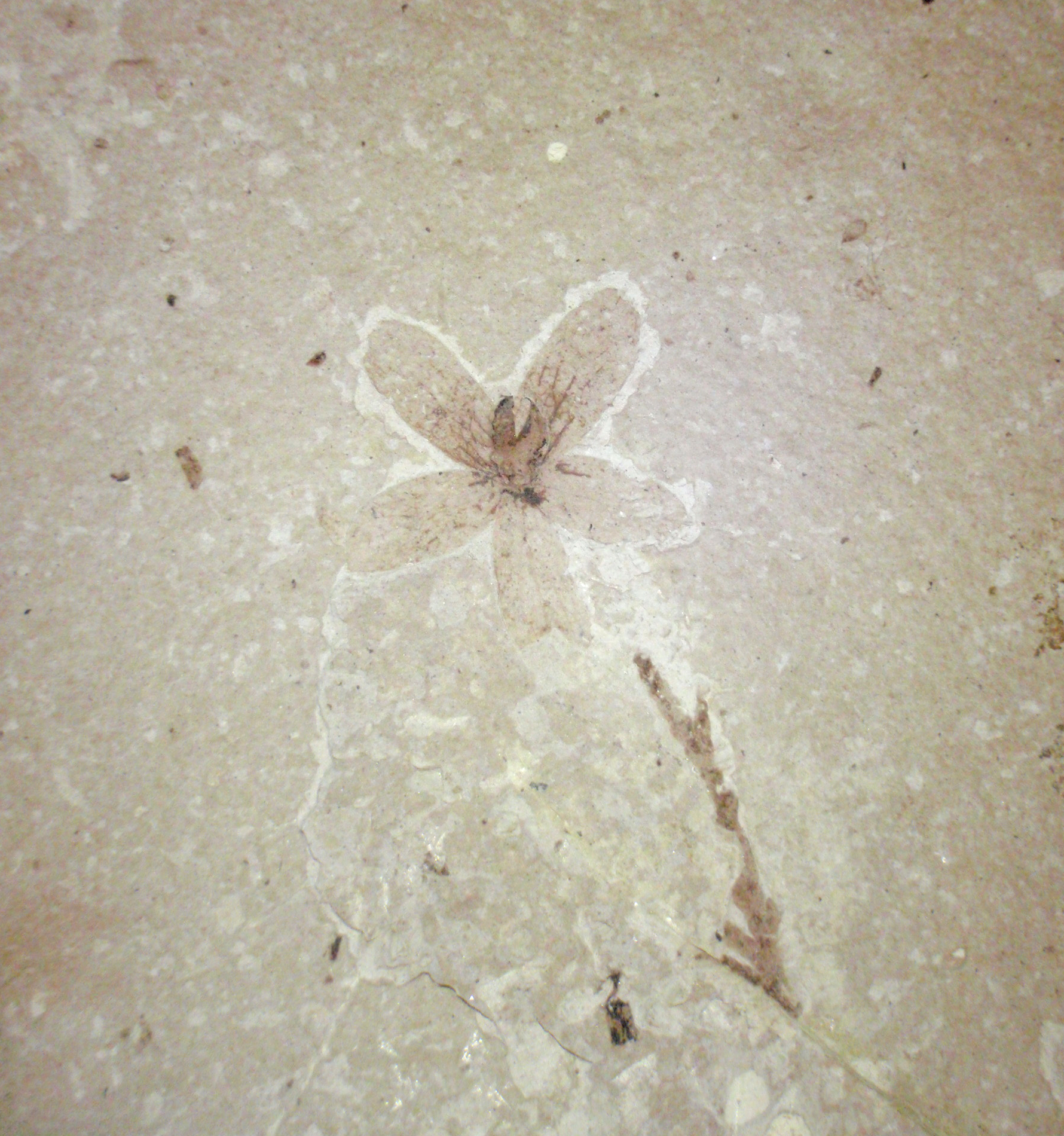
Eocene fossil flower from Florissant, Colorado

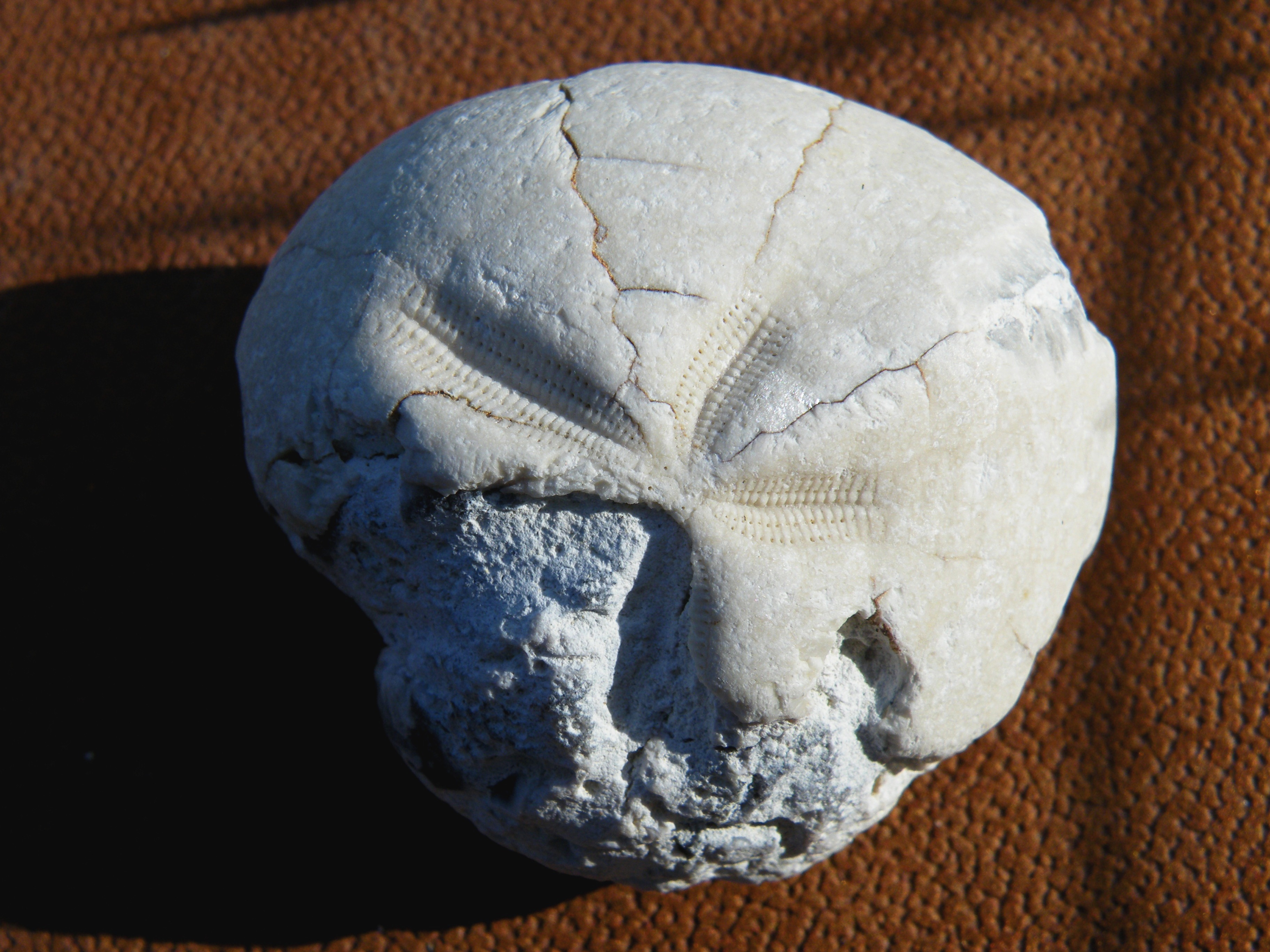
Micraster echinoid fossil from England

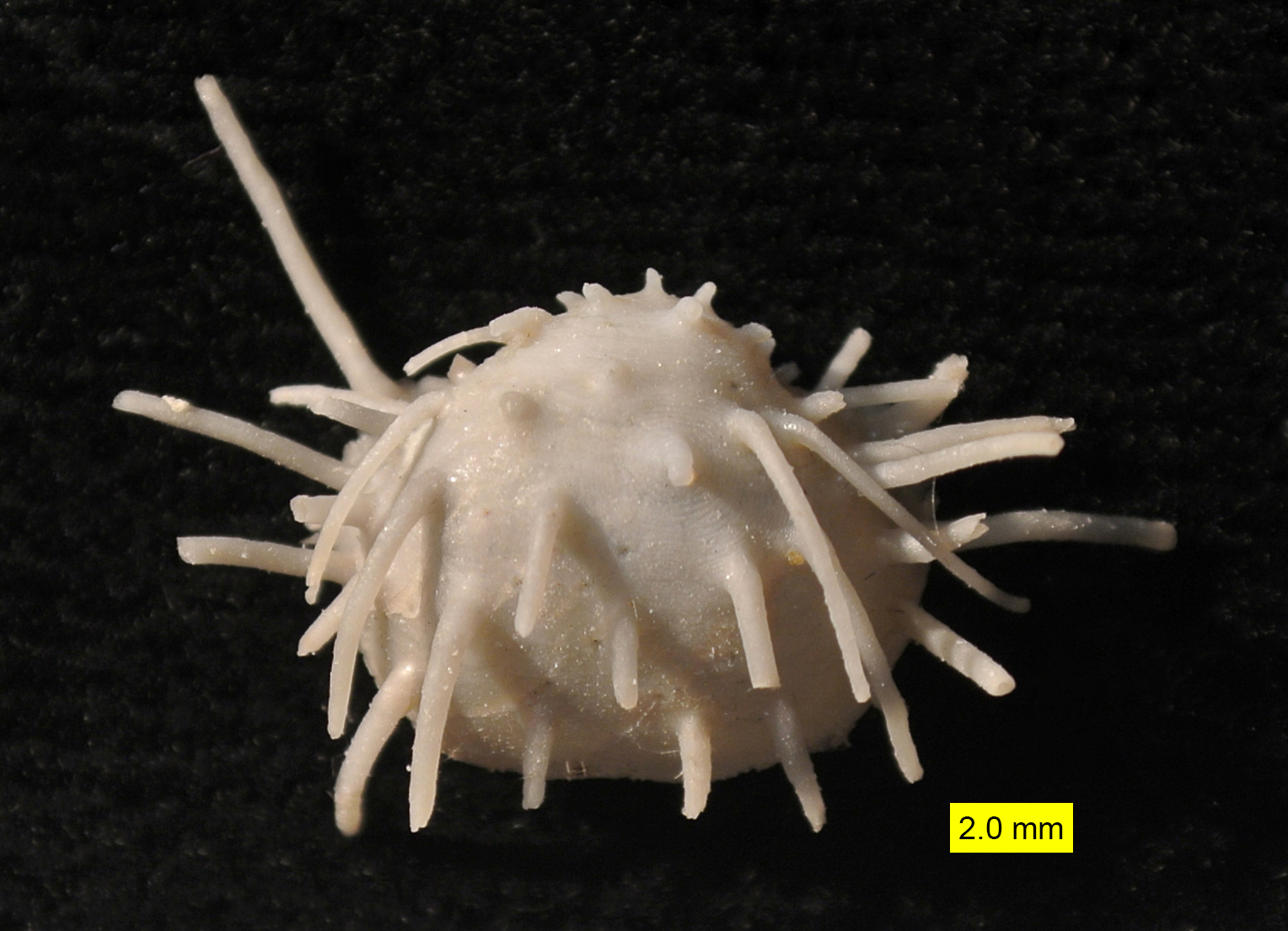
Productid brachiopod ventral valve; Roadian, Guadalupian (Middle Permian); Glass Mountains, Texas.

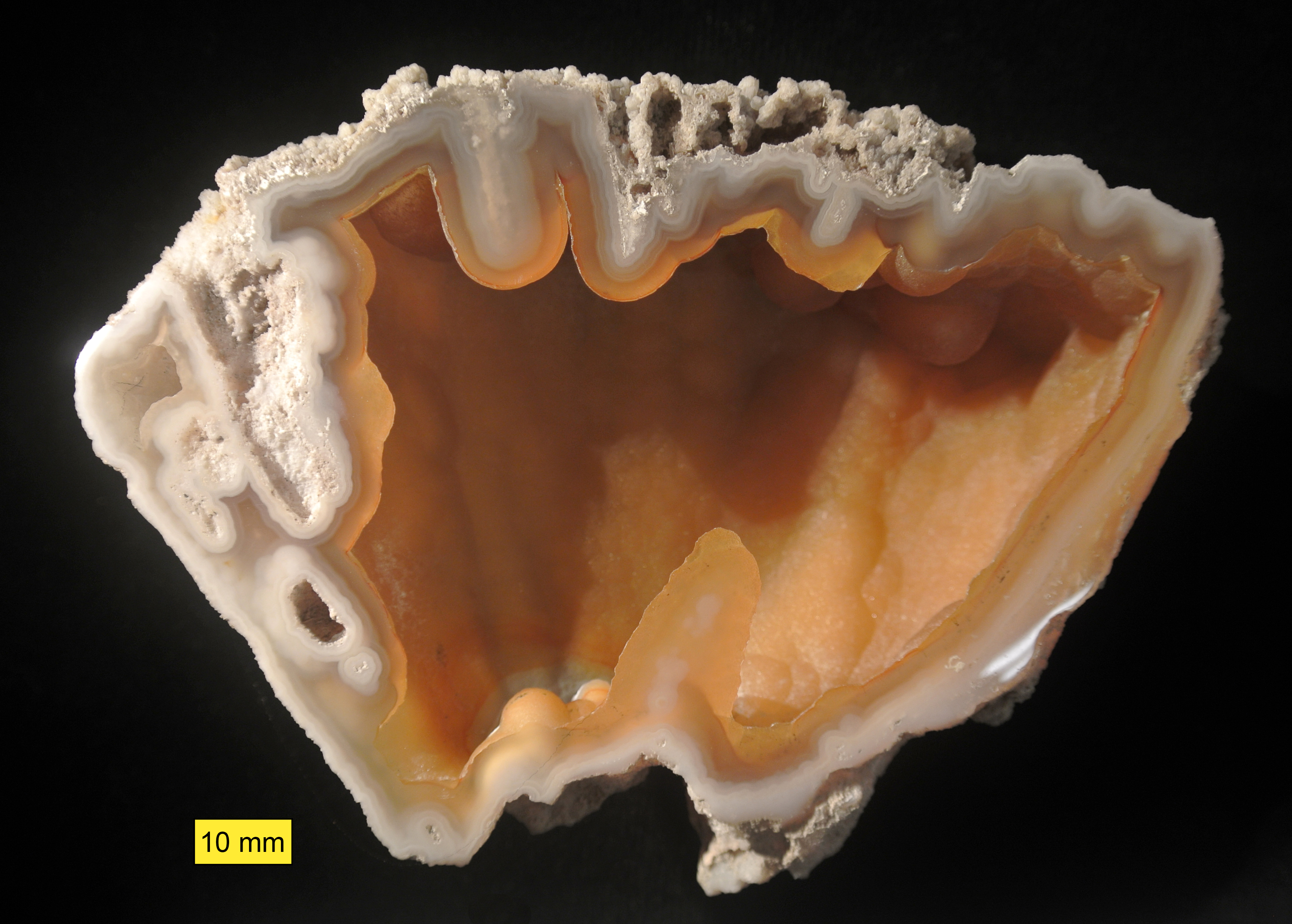
Agatized coral from the Hawthorn Group (Oligocene–Miocene), Florida. An example of preservation by replacement.

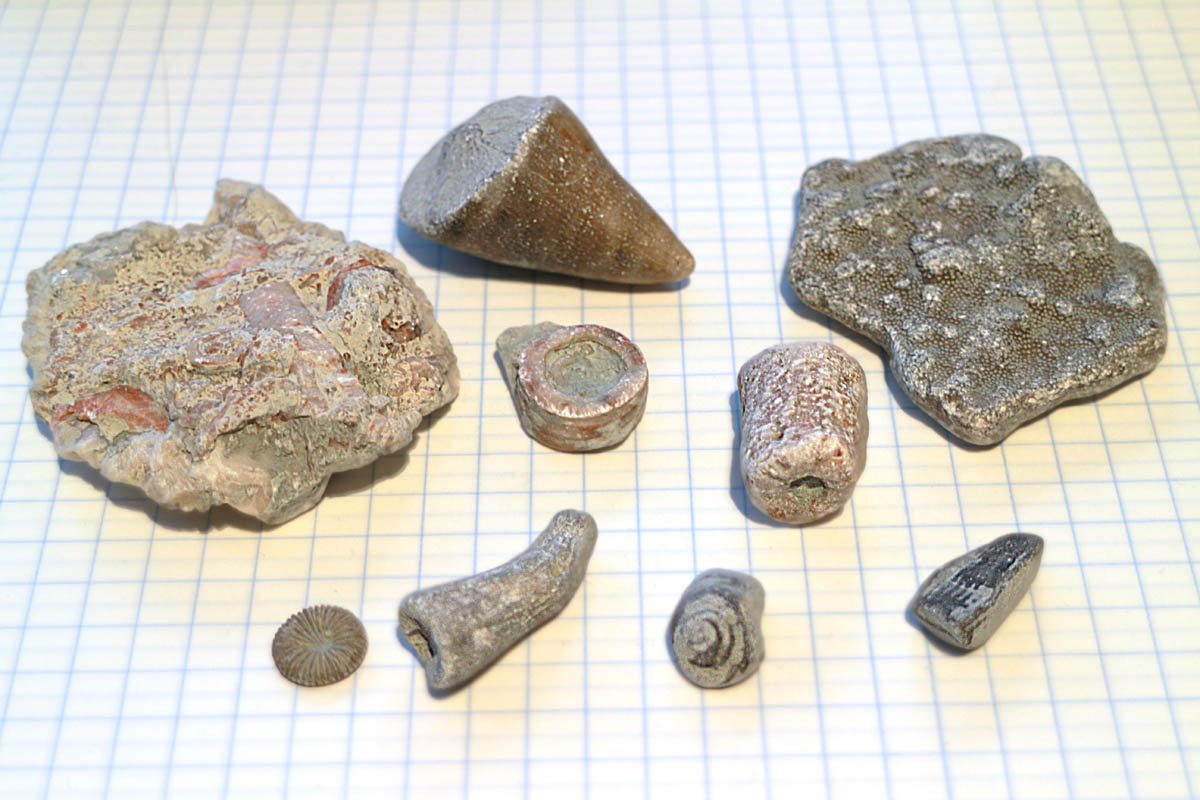
Fossils from beaches of the Baltic Sea island of Gotland, placed on paper with 7 mm (0.28 inch) squares

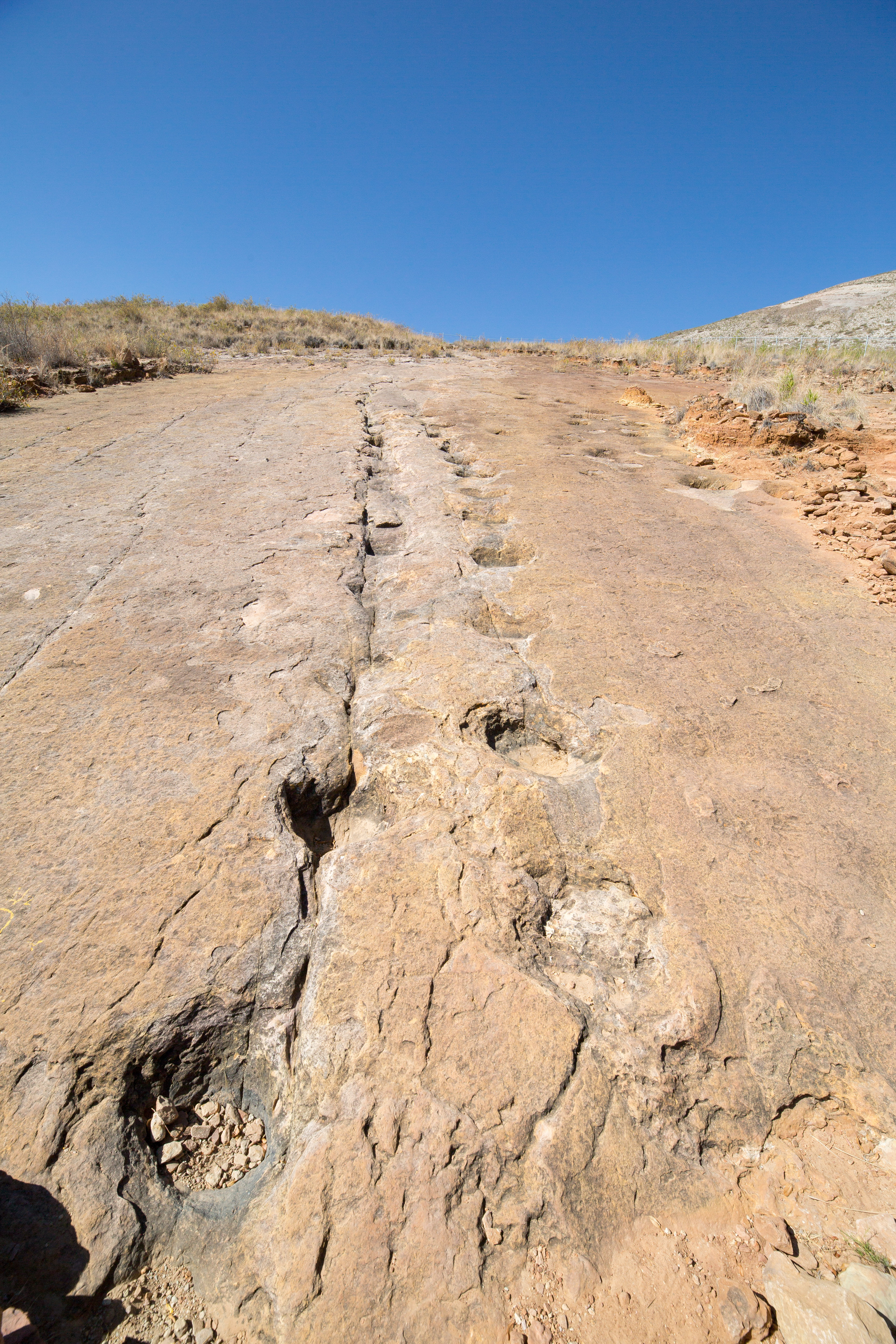
Dinosaur footprints from Torotoro National Park in Bolivia.

== See also ==
- Bioerosion – Erosion of hard ocean substrates by living organisms
- Cryptospore – Fossilised primitive plant spore
- Endolith – Organism living inside a rock
- List of fossil parks
- Living fossil – Organism resembling a form long shown in the fossil records
- Paleobiology – Study of organic evolution using fossils
- Paleobotany – Study of organic evolution of plants based on fossils
- Schultz's rule – Relationship between tooth wear and lifespan of fossil organisms
- Shark tooth – Teeth of a shark
- Signor–Lipps effect – Sampling bias in the fossil record raising difficulties to characterize extinctions

Preceded by Skeletonization	Stages of human development Fossilization	Succeeded by None
