= Rya Formation =

Swedish geologic formation

- Stratigraphic range: Early Sinemurian-late Aalenian; ~198–171 Ma
- Type: Formation
- Sub-units: Döshult, Pankarp, Katslösa & Rydebäck Members
- Underlies: Vilhelmsfält & Mariedal Formations
- Overlies: Höganäs Formation
- Thickness: Up to 295 m (968 ft)

Lithology
- Primary: Siltstone, claystone, sandstone, mudstone
- Other: Coal

Location
- Coordinates: 56.0°N 12.8°E
- Approximate paleocoordinates: 45.4°N 16.7°E
- Region: Skåne County; Øresund; Holstein
- Country: Sweden, Denmark (offshore, subsurface), Germany (ex situ)
- Extent: Höganäs & Øresund Basins

Type section
- Named for: Rya, Katslösa
- Rya Formation (Sweden)

The Rya Formation (Swedish: Ryaformationen) is a geologic formation in Skåne County, southern Sweden. It is Early to early Middle Jurassic (early Sinemurian to late Aalenian) in age. The Rya Formation comprises siltstones, claystones, sandstones, mudstones and rare coal beds. The formation overlies the Höganäs Formation and is overlain by the Vilhelmsfält and Mariedal Formations.

The formation was deposited in the Höganäs and Øresund Basins that formed in the earliest Jurassic as part of the break-up of Pangea. The 295 metres (968 ft) thick formation comprises four members, from base to top the Döshult, Pankarp, Katslösa and Rydebäck Members. The depositional environment of the formation ranges from continental to open marine.

The Rya Formation has provided fossils of a number of sharks, ammonites, bivalves and ichnofossils. Coalified wood occurs as scattered pieces up to 6 centimetres (2.4 in) long and indeterminate belemnites, echinoids, serpulids, ostracods and nodosariid foraminifera were also recorded in the formation. Iron ooids containing erratic boulders, called Geschiebe in German, attributed to the Rya Formation were found in Holstein, northern Germany.

== Description ==
The Rya Formation crops out in Colonus Shale Trough of western Scania. The formation overlies the Höganäs Formation and is overlain by the Vilhelmsfält Formation in the Helsingborg area and by the Mariedal Formation in the area of Landskrona and Kävlinge. The Rya Formation is subdivided, from base to top, into the Döshult, Pankarp, Katslösa and Rydebäck Members. The formation is found in the Ängelholm, Helsingborg, Landskrona and Kävlinge areas. In southwest Skåne, the Rya Formation is missing or only poorly developed. In the Øresund Basin between Sweden and Denmark, the formation is truncated by the Basal Middle Jurassic unconformity.

Erratic boulders, called Geschiebe in German, attributed to the Rya Formation and containing iron ooids were found in Holstein, northern Germany.

=== Subdivision ===
Döshult Member

The early Sinemurian Döshult Member (Swedish Döshultsledet) comprises coarse-grained cross-layered sandstones and siltstones in the lower part, and is dominated by dark clays and marls rich in marine fossils in the upper part. The member is up to 80 metres (260 ft) thick in the Ängelholm, Helsingborg and Landskrona areas. Presently, the basal part of this member is exposed at three localities in the Helsingborg area. These contain mineralogically and texturally mature, trough cross-bedded sandstones, commonly with herringbone structures showing north and south oriented paleocurrent directions. The occurrence of herringbone structures in well-sorted sand suggests high energy foreshore to subtidal marine depositional conditions for the lower part of the member. In an abandoned quarry in northwest Skåne (Gantofta brickpit in the Helsingborg area, outcrop very limited at present) the upper part of the Döshult Member commences with bioturbated marine nearshore sands, including burrows, as well as abundant marine invertebrate body fossils. This is followed by a bioturbated shelf mudstone with storm-deposited sand and silt intercalations (tempestites). A massive red mudstone with scarce marine body fossils and burrows follows, which is interpreted as having been deposited rapidly, in a low energy but oxidizing environment. The youngest part of the succession comprises siltstones and mudstones, with carbonate-rich beds, deposited in a shallow marine setting. Coaly detritus, muscovite, very small shells and shell fragments, and framboidal pyrite nodules (0.1–0.3 mm in diameter) are characteristic constituents of this member.

Pankarp Member

The dark mudstones of the Döshult Member are overlain by the Pankarp Member (Swedish Pankarpsledet) with a sharp conglomeratic boundary. The late Sinemurian Pankarp Member has an estimated thickness of up to 70 metres (230 ft) in the subsurface of the Ängelholm, Helsingborg and Landskrona areas. In the Kävlinge area, the thickness is about 20 metres (66 ft) thick. In westernmost Skåne, the member has been observed in small diameter drill cores. There, the member is subdivided into a lower unit of variegated clays and shales, a middle, poorly sorted silty to sandy unit including a coal bed, and an upper monotonous mudstone unit which is silty and rich in organic matter at the base, and reddish–greenish at the top. It presents different coloration probably due to different degrees of oxidation of iron in the claystone. In the uppermost part of one core, the Pankarp Member comprises lenticular bedded heteroliths with Planolites burrows.

Katslösa Member

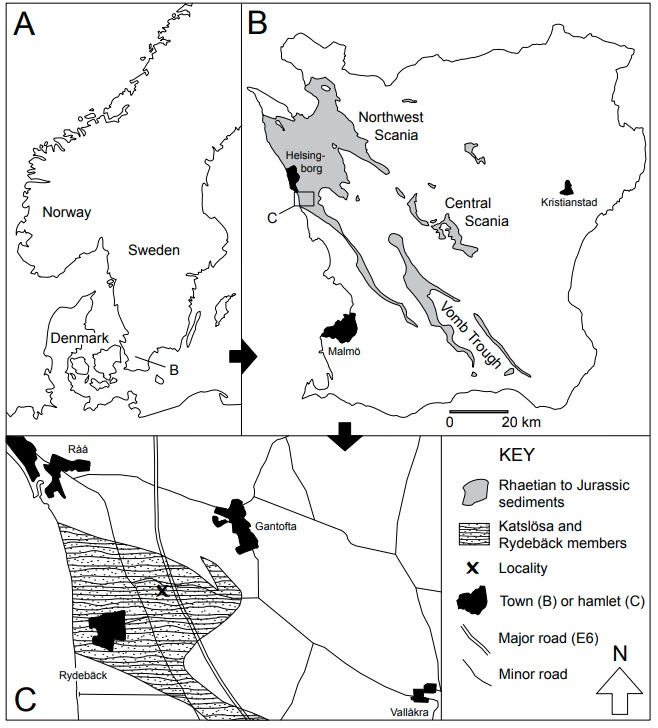
Map of the Katslösa and Rydeback members

The late Sinemurian to early Pliensbachian Katslösa Member (Swedish Katslösaledet) is mainly known from the subsurface in westernmost Skåne, and it has a thickness of 30 to 40 metres (98 to 131 ft) in the Ängelholm, Helsingborg and Landskrona areas. In the Kävlinge area, the thickness is about 75 metres (246 ft). Sedimentological interpretations are mainly based on the results of petrographical studies of museum collections. The Katslösa Member yields a rich marine microfauna and macrofauna, and it is dominated by homogeneous mudstone deposited in a marine low-energy environment. Is composed mostly by marine green, brown and dark gray claystones and sandstones. Thin beds of matrix-rich quartz wackes are common. They are typically mineralogically mature but texturally highly immature with abundant angular sand grains. The matrix comprises organic matter, micrite, mica and clay minerals. In thin section, the sandstones show evidence of intense burrowing, which has obliterated depositional structures. Scattered berthierine ooids, as well as authigenic siderite crystals have been observed in the member.

Rydebäck Member

The late Pliensbachian to late Aalenian Rydebäck Member (Swedish Rydebäcksledet) is up to 70 metres (230 ft) thick in the Ängelholm, Helsingborg and Landskrona areas. It is only known from subsurface material in westernmost Skåne, and sedimentological analysis is based on observations from two wells (Rydebäck–Fortuna-1 and -4). These layers were deposited in small bands during a sea regression, and consist of marine gray, black, green and reddish brown sand and siltstones. The member comprises a uniform succession of muddy arenites with a rich marine microfauna (mostly foraminifera), and represents deposition in an offshore low-energy environment. The sediments are strongly burrowed, which has caused an effective mixing of sand and mud, resulting in the forming of quartz wackes. The sand is quartz-rich, and grains are typically well rounded. Berthierine ooids are common constituents of the sediment.

=== Depositional environments ===
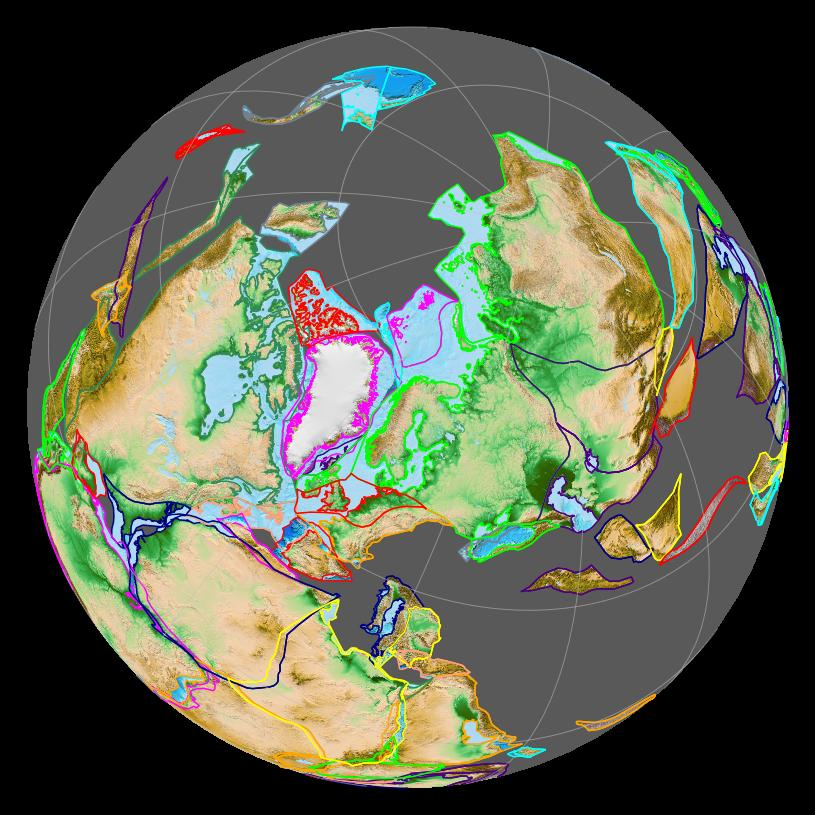
Early Jurassic paleogeography

Tethys Sea transgression entailed formation of fossil-bearing marine deposits in Skane, also associated with an increased tectonic activity. Deposition of the Rya Formation began with nearshore coarse clastics, and continued with offshore mudstones with tempestites (the Döshult Member), followed by offshore muddy sediments with a brief non-marine interval (the Pankarp Member), and ended with deposition of open marine low-energy deposits (Katslösa and Rydebäck Members). The marine Rya Formation shows an overall fining-upwards trend, and an up-section bathymetric deepening of the depositional environment. The depositional environment in western Skåne was either physically protected from the storm energy due to basin topography, or deposition in Skåne took place below storm wavebase. Berthierine ooids occur scattered in the Katslösa Member and are increasingly abundant up-section in the Rydebäck Member. There is a possibility that iron ooid formation was promoted by precipitation of iron and silica from volcanic fluids rising up through the substrate, as has been reported from modern marine sediments offshore Indonesia. This hypothesis has emerged with the publication of age data for the volcanic rocks in Skåne, which now appear to be comparable in age to the prominent iron ooid-bearing deposits, i.e. the Rydebäck Member and the Röddinge Formation.

=== Age ===
Based on foraminifers, ammonites and ostracods, the Döshult Member is dated to the early Sinemurian, the Pankarp Member to the late Sinemurian, the Katslösa Member to the late Sinemurian to early Pliensbachian and the Rydebäck Member to the late Pliensbachian to late Aalenian.

The formation is time-equivalent with the Röddinge Formation of the Vomb Trough, the Djupadal Formation in central Skane and the Sorthat Formation of Denmark, with which it shares the Spheripollenites–Leptolepidites and Callialasporites–Perinopollenites Zones. The formation also correlates with the Fjerritslev Formation of the Danish Basin, and the Gassum Formation of the Øresund Basin. The storm-dominated, hummocky cross-stratified Hasle Formation on Bornholm is contemporaneous with the muddy Katslösa Member of the Rya Formation.

== Basin history ==
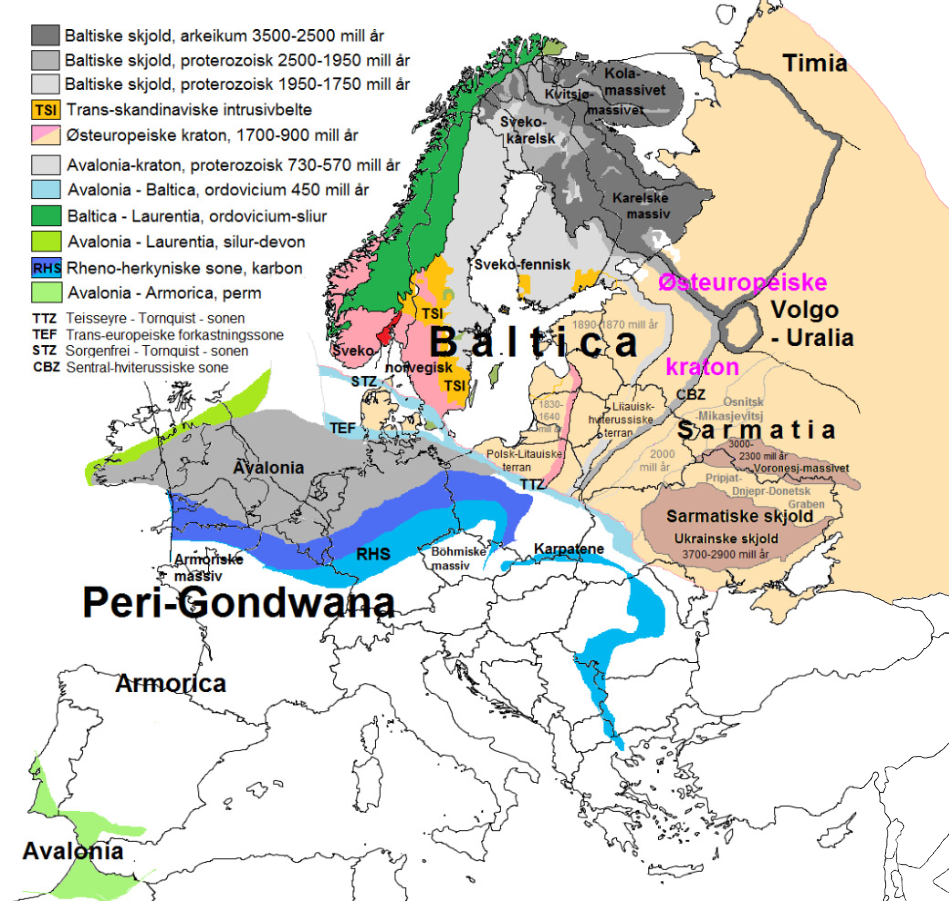
The Sorgenfrei-Tornquist Zone (STZ) running through southern Sweden and eastern Denmark is indicated in lightblue

Basement

The basins where the Rya Formation was deposited form part of the Sorgenfrei-Tornquist Zone (STZ) of the Trans-European Suture Zone, the boundary between Baltica to the northeast and Peri-Gondwana to the southwest. The orogeny was active in the Late Ordovician, or approximately 445 million years ago.

At the Carboniferous-Permian boundary around 300 Ma, the area was influenced by the Skagerrak-Centered Large Igneous Province, another large igneous province stretching across the North Sea, the eponymous Skagerrak between Denmark and Sweden and to the northwest up to northern England and Scotland.

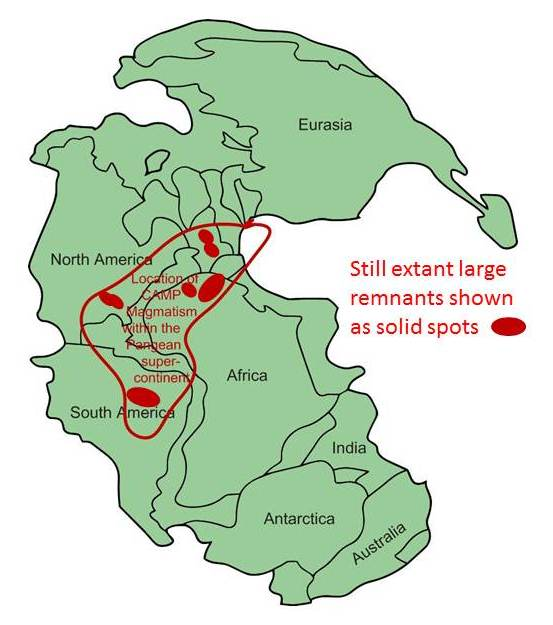
Extent of the CAMP

Break-up of Pangea

The basins of southern Sweden and eastern Denmark were formed during the latest Triassic and earliest Jurassic. During this time the Central Atlantic magmatic province (CAMP), with an estimated 11,000,000 square kilometres (4,200,000 sq mi) the largest igneous province in Earth's history, was formed to the present southwest of the Danish-Swedish realm. In the Skåne area, the Central Skåne Volcanic Province was active during the time of deposition of the Rya Formation, commencing around the Sinemurian-Pliensbachian boundary. The earliest magmatism was partly emplaced into and across pre-existing extensional basin structures. The first and the main volcanic phase of this volcanic province occurred in the Early Jurassic (late Sinemurian to Toarcian) at 191–178 Ma. Analysis of the volcanic rocks produced by this Jurassic volcanism suggests a continental Strombolian-type eruptive character close to the oceans of the Early Jurassic. No correlative pyroclastic beds have yet been identified in sedimentary basins surrounding central Skåne.

Toarcian

During deposition of the Rydebäck Member, the Toarcian turnover happened. This event at the Pliensbachian-Toarcian boundary characterized by widespread anoxic conditions globally, led to the extinction of various groups of flora and fauna. Taxa inhabiting the upper water column were unaffected by anoxia and included ammonites and belemnites. Epifaunal taxa adapted to low-oxygen conditions, such as the buchiids, posidoniids and inoceramids, flourished in the post-extinction environment during the survival interval.

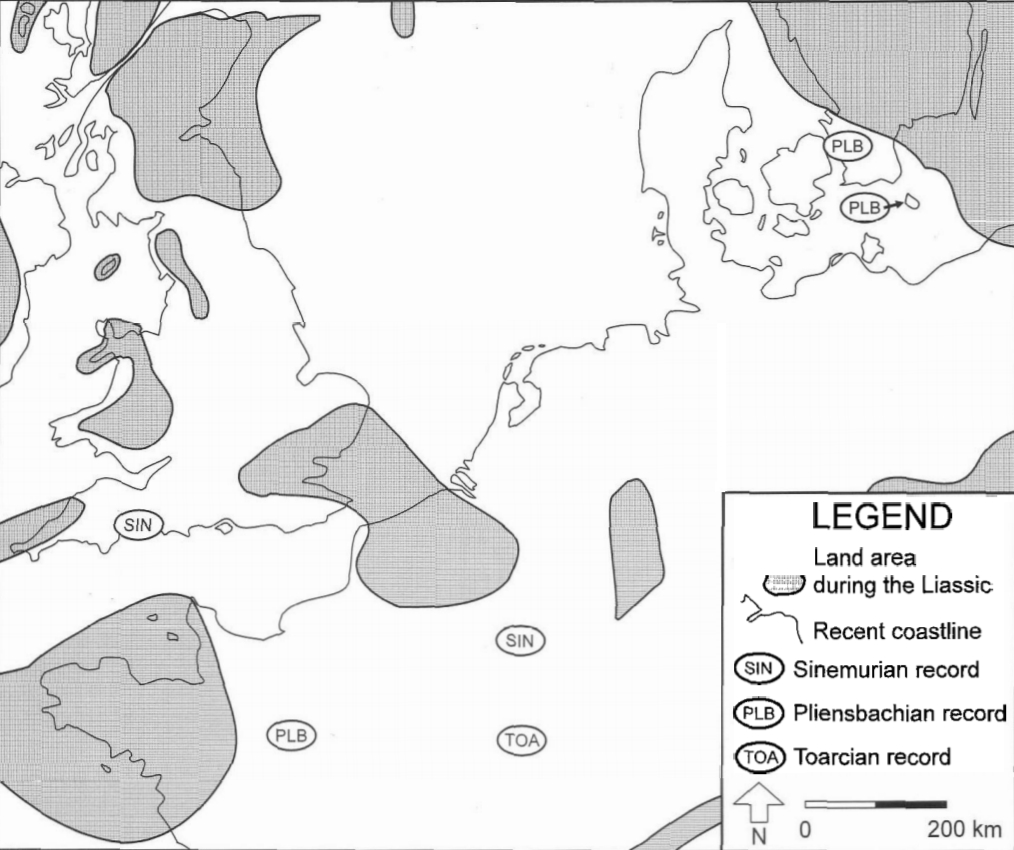
Paleogeography of northwestern Europe during the Early Jurassic with Agaleus shark fossil finds. Elevated land areas are shown in grey.

== Economic geology ==
A study on the geothermal potential of reservoirs in the Øresund Basin published in 2018 by Erlström et al. gave results of the formation together with the Gassum and Höganäs Formations, giving the following characteristics of the three Early Jurassic formations:

- Net sand thickness - 60 to 100 metres (200 to 330 ft)
- Porosity - 18 to 34%
- Permeability - 50 to 1500 mD
- Cl^{−} concentration - 120 to 190 gram/liter
- Productivity index - 7.0 m3/hr/bar

A study published in the same year analyzing the CO_{2} storage potential of the Rya and Höganäs Formations concluded a storage capacity of 543 megatons of carbon dioxide.

The organic content of the Jurassic strata in Skåne is typically dominated by gas-prone kerogen (type III), which is below, or at the onset of, thermal maturity.

== Paleoenvironment ==
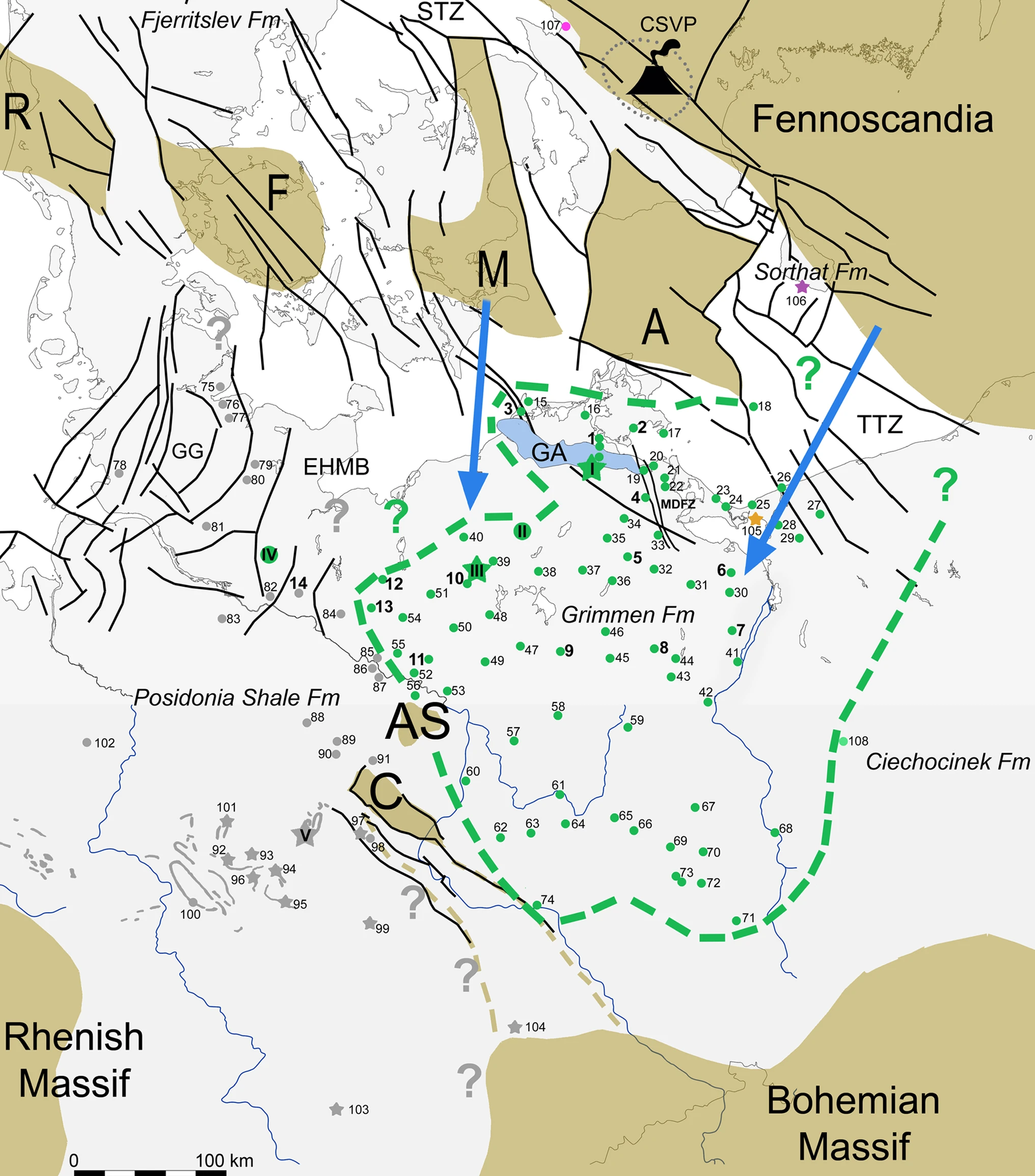
Simplified Paleogeography of the NGB in the Toarcian, with the extent of the coeval Grimmen Formation and adjacent units, with the Rya Fm marked by the 107 (=Vilhelmsfält Borehole)

The sedimentological evolution of the Jurassic in southwestern Skåne, specially the Rya Formation, has provided depth diverse data about its different environments, specially on those samples recovered on the Höllviken-2 core and sidewall cores from the FFC-1 well. The unit was linked on all its sedimentological history with the main Fennoscandinavian land. The local succession in the Höllviken Halfgraben and Barsebäck Platform has measured continue during most of the Triassic and Early Jurassic times. Inte western part of the Höllviken Halfgraben during the Hettangian–Pliensbachian succession there is evidence of higher subsidence rate along the Öresund Fault, indicating tectonically controlled deposition and the presence of a submarine high at the west of this fault. In the east is the Skarup Platform, interpreted as a Jurassic high based on its incomplete or missing Rhaetian–Lower Jurassic strata, along redeposited spores and pollen in the Höllviken Halfgraben and increased sand output, that point to this zone as the major freshwater terrestrial source. This deposits shows several nearshore environments, from offshore marine environment probably below wave base on the sinemurian level, as proven by the presence of well cemented fine sand and 2 m thick clay dominated heterolites, that change to more marine influenced flaser bedded heterolites with some strongly bioturbated horizons and convolute beds in the Pliensbachian, and end in the Pliensbachian–Lower Toarcian with a sandy seashore setting with high energy lenticular beds. Some sections are suggested to be tidal flat zones and/or distal bar deltaic deposits. Coeval with the Rydebäck member, at Anholt (Fjerritslev Formation) where studied several levels that point to a connected fluvial system. Concretely the Upper Pliensbachian-Toarcian boundary marks the beginning of a major regression, which continued through the Toarcian and Aalenian. The discovery of the foraminifera Eoguttuliiia liassica, Bony Fishes and Scolecodonts, points that the Pliens-Toar boundary has a shallow water environment, possibly of reduced salinity. The Pollen and spores, identical of those found on the Rydebäck member (Vilhelmsfält Bore No. 1 and Karindal bore no. 1), increase, and the dinoflagellate cysts decrease, suggesting more proximal shoreline. This layers, on both Anholt and the Rydebäck member, are considered to represent a regression from marine inner shelf environments to near lagoonal or deltaic conditions during the late Pliensbachian and early Toarcian, but with light marine influence, as show the presence of Dactylioceras on the Rydebäck member. The sequence points concretely than in both units The Late Pliensbachian sediments at were deposited in a storm-influenced Inner Shelf setting, that changed on the Lower Toarcian into a more restricted, marginal-marine conditions with delta progradation. Then in the late Toarcian increased brackish conditions, to end on a short marine encroachment during the Early Aalenian.

The study of the Jurassic sediments has allowed to know that the basement rocks of southern Sweden were deeply weathered in Late Triassic-Cretaceous times, with formed saprolites on the sub-mesozoic basement and high amount of Kaolinite on the stronger weathered profiles, opposed to smectite on the less weathered ones. Thus, fluvial currents released smectite-rich weathering material to the Late Triassic–Jurassic receiving basins. The members of the Rya Formation recover a transition from deltaic to paralic coast and shallow marine, dominated by kaolinite, along with peaks of illite and smectite. The record of this minerals showed that at the time of deposition of the Rya Formation, mid-latitude warmth and pronounced humidity to drier pseudomediterranean climates allowed on the denuded bedrock in the Fennoscandian Shield, composed of Gneisses or Granites, at places intersected by Dolerite dykes, fracturation and active erosion/weathering. The coeval Djupadal Formation volcanic ash falls at the east Skarup Platform-Central Skane Volcanic Province, may have diluted the marine sediments, with raised smectite content. The pronounced mineralogical maturity of most Swedish post-Norian Mesozoic arenites confirms widespread feldspar destruction in the weathering profiles of the Paleozoic crystalline basement at the north, as a consequence of the increased humidity. A fish tooth recovered from the lower Toarcian of the North West German Basin presents a radiogenic seawater value of −6 ε-units, which is quite counter-intuitive to the idea of massive unradiogenic crustal-derived inputs from Laurasia. Clastic fractions found on the same layer suggest brief radiogenic Nd influxes from the Skåne flood basalts erupted at this time.

Pliensbachian

Lower-late Pliensbachian Layers at Katslösa are similar in faunal composition. The Katslösa Member composition suggest deposition on a Low Energy Marginal marine environment with absence of changes in the salinity (As proven by the presence of Echinoderms and other low salt intolerant fauna), with active bottoms filled by traces of diverse invertebrates and abundance of Bivalves. The Upper Pliensbachian section that mark the appearance of the Rydebäck Member continues the stable salinity environment with increased presence of Echinoderms, but lack of a diverse Bivalve fauna as in the older section. This unit was deposited likely on a marine setting more proximal to the shore and low-energy, more strongly burrowed than older layers. The presence of Selachian fauna can be more likely derived from a more suitable depositional setting for this remains than a biota turnover. Palynology in this section is dominated by spores in the Karindal bore no. 1, suggesting a humid climate on nearby emerged lands.

Toarcian

Toarcian layers of the formation where influenced by the ongoing vulcanism located in the Central Skåne Volcanic Province (Djupadal Formation), as, marine water influence is observed in the main outcrop of the last unit, where enriched Zeolite by Barium is suggested to derive from oceanic water, that may have circulated as hydrothermal flows in the lapilli tuff and facilitating diagenetic changes. Is also known by palynological analysis on the Bonnarp Cone, where saltwater/brackish acritarchs like Leiosphaera and Leiofusa or Dinoflajellates like Nannoceratopsis where recovered. This section also recovers the increased influence of Terrestrial weathering measured in the layers after the Toarcian AOE, as seen in the Vilhelmsfalt borehole, where plant remains increase their presence, suggesting a regression of the coast influenced by the increased volcanic-derived materials. The Palynology in this section is dominated by the Pollen of Chasmatosporites (Cycads), with at least six species recovered, playing more than 50% of the total palynological samples, implicating a clear dominant role of the producer of this Pollen and suggesting along the increased amount of Cheirolepidiaceae pollen and general decrease of spores a shif towards a more arid climate on nearby settings.

== Fossil content ==
The formation has provided fossils of typically marine fauna. With the exception of a continental coal bed, the formation is marine in character. Shark teeth were reported from the Rydebäck Member.

=== Annelida ===
- Eklexibella johanni
- Serpula quinquesulcata
- Serpula terquemi
- Serpula cf. raricostati

=== Echinodermata ===
- ?Acrosaleniidae Indeterminate
- Balanocrinus subteroides
- Hispidocrinus scalaris
- Isocrinus ranae
- Pentacrinus basaltiformis

=== Ammonites ===
- Agassiceras nodulatum
- Amaltheus margaritatus
- Amauroceras ferrugineum
- Arnioceras cf. falcaries
- Arnioceras sp. indet.
- Asteroceras obtusum
- Coroniceras rejnesi
- Cymbites striaries
- Dactylioceras tenuicostatum
- Dactylioceras cf. semicelatum
- Echioceras raricostatum
- Eleganticeras elegantulum
- Eparietites sp. indet.
- Euagassiceras resupinatum
- Euagassiceras spinaries
- Euagassiceras lundgreni
- Euagassiceras cf. lundgreni
- Megarietites meridionalis
- Oxynoticeras oxynotum
- Oxynoticeras? sp. indet.
- Paracoroniceras crossi
- Pleuroceras spinatum
- Pleuroceras hawskerense
- Polymorphites angustus
- Prodactylioceras davoei
- Promicroceras planicostatum
- Promicroceras sp. juv.
- Tragophylloceras ibex
- Uptonia jamesoni

=== Belemnites ===
- "Belemnites" elongatus
- "Belemnites" milleri
- Passaloteuthis alveolata
- Passaloteuthis apicicurvata
- Passaloteuthis cf. virgata
- ?Passaloteuthis sp.
- Pseudohastites charmouthensis
- Pseudohastites cf. arundineus

=== Brachiopods ===
- Rhynchonella deffneri
- Spiriferina walcotti
- Zeilleria numismalis
- Zeilleria perforata

=== Bivalves ===
- Anomia pellucida
- Anisocardia luggudensis
- Arcomya decora
- Arcomya cf. elongata
- Astarte angelini
- Astarte fructuum
- Astarte scanensis
- Astarte fortuna
- Astarte deltoidea
- Astarte oerbyensis
- Astarte ryensis
- Astarte sp.
- Barbatia pulla
- Cardinia tollini
- Cardinia expansa
- Cardinia ingelensis
- Cardinia kullensis
- Cardinia spp.
- Chlamys interpunctata
- Chlamys textoria
- Chlamys janiformis
- Chlamys subulata
- Chlamys tullbergi
- Chlamys textaria
- Chlamys interpunctata
- Dimyodon sp.
- Entolium sp.
- Entolium hehli
- Entolium calvum
- Entolium cingulatum
- Entolium lundgreni
- Eotrapezium gerrnari
- Eotrapezium pullastra
- Eotrapezium heberti
- Eotrapezium menkei
- Gervillia angelini
- Gervillia scanica
- Gervillia hagenowi
- Gervillia sjögreni
- Goniomya heteropleura
- Grammatodon cypriniformis
- Grammatodon sinuatus
- Grammatodon subrhomboidalis
- Homomya sp.
- Homomya ovalis
- Homomya venulithus
- Homomya centralis
- Homomya librata
- Isognomon sp.
- Leda sp.
- Liastrea hisingeri
- Lima duplicata
- Lima pectinoides
- Limea acuticostata
- Limea katsloesensis
- Liogryphaea sp.
- Liogryphaea arcuata
- Liogryphaea lata
- Lioqryphaea regularis
- Modiola hillana
- Modiola ruuthi
- Modiola cf. tenuissima
- Modiola scalprum
- Myoconcha decorata
- Mytilus cf. lamellosus
- Nucula sp.
- Nucula distinguenda
- Nuculana sp.
- Nuculana zieteni
- Nuculana doris
- Oxytoma sinemurensis
- Oxytoma inaequivalvis
- Oxytoma scanica
- Palaeoneilo sp.
- Palaeoneilo galatea
- Palaeoneilo bornholmiensis
- Palaeoneilo oviformis
- Plagiostoma succincta
- Platymya aquarum
- Pleuromya sp.
- Pleuromya forchhammeri
- Pleuromya corrugata
- Plicatula spinosa
- Plicatula orbiculoides
- Protocardia philippiana
- Protocardia oxynoti
- Protocardia truncata
- Pseudopecten aequivalvis
- Pseudopis sp.
- Rollieria sp.
- Rollieria bronni
- Sphaeriola kurremolinae
- Taeniodon nathorsti
- Tancredia arenacea
- Tancredia securiformis
- Tancredia erdmanni
- Tancredia johnstrupi
- Tancredia lineata
- Terquemia arietis
- Trigonia primaeva
- Trigonia modesta
- Tutcheria cingulata
- Tutcheria cf. rickardsoni

=== Gastropods ===
- Actaeonina nathorsti
- Actaeonina cf. striata
- Chemnitzia sp.
- Chrysostoma cf. solarium
- Kalchreuthia frankei
- Ptychomphalus cf. expansus
- Trochus cf. imbricatus
- Trochus laevis

=== Scaphopods ===
- Baltodentalium weitschati
- "Dentalium" hexagonale
- Laevidentalium elongatum
- Laevidentalium sp.
- Prodentalium bandeli
- Progadilina spaethi
- Progadilina subtrigonalis

=== Branchiopoda ===
- Kuqaia scanicus

=== Ostracods ===
- Astacolus denticulina carinata
- Brizalina liassica amalthea
- Citharina inaequistriata
- Cristacythere crassireticulata
- Marginulina spinata spinata
- Nanacythere simplex
- Ogmoconchella danica
- Ogmoconchella mouhersensis
- Ogmoconchella adenticulata
- Ogmoconcha amalthei amalthei
- Pleurifera harpa

=== Mites ===
- Hydrozetes nsp.

=== Ichnofossils ===
- Chondrites sp.
- Diplocraterion sp.
- Planolites sp.
- Rhizocorallium sp.
- Skolithos sp.
- Teichichnus sp.

=== Fish ===
Apart from a few teeth of the hybodont Hybodus reticulatus, the shark fauna from the Rya Formation is exclusively neoselachian.

Color key: Taxon / Reclassified taxon / Taxon falsely reported as present / Dubious taxon or junior synonym / Ichnotaxon / Ootaxon / Morphotaxon	Notes; Uncertain or tentative taxa are in small text; ~~crossed out~~ taxa are discredited.

Genus/Family	Species	Location	Member	Material	Notes/Affinities	Images
Archaeotolithus	Archaeotolithus bornholmiensis	Katslösa, Bed 30	Katslösa Member	20 Otoliths	Interpreted as sagittal otoliths of a Palaeonisciformes Indet. Originally assigned to the extant family Sciaenidae, then from members of Palaeoniscidae and finally some recent research suggest affinities with Pholidophoriformes. Bony Fish Otoliths Similar to ones recovered from the Hasle Formation.	
Acrodus	Acrodus sp.	Katslösa, Bed 42	Katslösa Member	Small Fragment of Tooth Crown	A marine Shark, member of the Acrodontidae.	
Actinopterygii	Actinopterygii Indeterminate	Road between the hamlets of Rya and Katslosa	Rydebäck Member	Scales; Ganoid Scales	Incertae Sedis Bony Fish Scales	
Agaleus	Agaleus dorsetensis	Road between the hamlets of Rya and Katslosa	Rydebäck Member	Four incomplete teeth	A Marine Shark of the Family Agaleidae	
Chimaeriformes	Chimaeriformes Indeterminate	Road between the hamlets of Rya and Katslosa	Rydebäck Member	Fragmentary Remains	Incertae Sedis fragmentary remains of Chimaeras	
Hybodus	Hybodus reticulatus	Road between the hamlets of Rya and Katslosa	Rydebäck Member	Fin Spine; Multiple Teeth	A marine Shark, member of the Hybodontiformes. Related to Hybodus hauffianus and other genera from the south of Germany. Only non-Neoselachian recovered from the location.	
Hexanchidae	Hexanchidae indet.	Road between the hamlets of Rya and Katslosa	Rydebäck Member	Single incomplete tooth	Marine Cow Sharks, Incertae Sedis Inside Hexanchidae. Isolated teeth appear to be similar to Hexanchus arzoeensis.	
Paraorthacodus	Paraorthacodus sp.	Road between the hamlets of Rya and Katslosa	Rydebäck Member	Three broken teeth	Marine Sharks of the Family Palaeospinacidae. One of the earliest records of the genus Paraorthacodus, together with others from France.	
Palidiplospinax	Palidiplospinax occultidens; Palidiplospinax enniskilleni; Palidiplospinax? sp.	Road between the hamlets of Rya and Katslosa	Rydebäck Member	Teeth; One complete scale	Marine Sharks of the Family Palaeospinacidae. The complete scale described above most closely resembles scales from Synechodus pinnai.	
"Synechodus"	"Synechodus" sp.	Road between the hamlets of Rya and Katslosa	Rydebäck Member	One complete tooth	Marine Sharks of the Family Palaeospinacidae. The tooth described may represent a new species.	
Sphenodus	Sphenodus sp.	Road between the hamlets of Rya and Katslosa	Rydebäck Member	Two complete teeth	Marine Sharks of the Family Orthacodontidae.	

=== Plant Remains ===
Coalified wood occurs as scattered pieces up to 6 centimetres (2.4 in) long and indeterminate belemnites, echinoids, serpulids, ostracods and nodosariid foraminifera were also recorded in the formation. Ammonites where found on layers with plant fossils. Fragments of Dactylioceras were found at a depth of 170 m in the Vilhelmsfalt borehole, together with plant remains and beautifully preserved Pelecypods. The plant material, probably derived from watercourses emptying in the neighborhood, consists mostly of small fragments that seem to have been intimately sedimented with the muddy material that flocculated on meeting the seawater. Other specimen, Arnioceras sp. indet. occurs on what appears to be a transitional environment, probably a back-beach with coalified fragments of plants, some of a large size. Probably due to the shell being washed to land due to a storm.

==== Algae ====
Genus/Family	Species	Stratigraphic position	Member	Material	Notes/Affinities	Images
Botryococcus	braunii, calcareus, nsp. A, nsp. B	Vilhelmsfält Bore No. 1, Karindal bore no. 1	Rydebäck Member	Miospores	Botryococcaceae	Extant Specimen
Campenia	gigas	Vilhelmsfält Bore No. 1, Karindal bore no. 1	Rydebäck Member	Miospores	Prasinophyceae	
Nannoceratopsis	gracilis, senex	Vilhelmsfält Bore No. 1, Karindal bore no. 1	Rydebäck Member	Cysts	Nannoceratopsiaceae	
Schizosporis	sp.	Vilhelmsfält Bore No. 1, Karindal bore no. 1	Rydebäck Member	Miospores	Zygnemataceae	
Tasmanites	sp.	Vilhelmsfält Bore No. 1, Karindal bore no. 1	Rydebäck Member	Miospores	Pyramimonadaceae	
Veryhachium	sp.	Vilhelmsfält Bore No. 1, Karindal bore no. 1	Rydebäck Member	Cysts	Dinophyceae	

==== Bryophytes ====
Genus/Family	Species	Stratigraphic position	Member	Material	Notes/Affinities	Images
Foraminisporis	jurassicus	Vilhelmsfält Bore No. 1, Karindal bore no. 1	Rydebäck Member	Spores	Notothyladaceae	Example of extant Notothylas specimens
Marchantiolites	cf. porosus	West of Heiligendamm	Katslösa Member	thallus	Marchantiaceae	Extant Marchantia polymorpha
Neochomotriletes	triangularis	Vilhelmsfält Bore No. 1, Karindal bore no. 1	Rydebäck Member	Spores	Notothyladaceae	
Polycingulatisporites	circulus	Vilhelmsfält Bore No. 1, Karindal bore no. 1	Rydebäck Member	Spores	Notothyladaceae	
Staplinisporites	caminus	Vilhelmsfält Bore No. 1, Karindal bore no. 1	Rydebäck Member	Spores	Encalyptaceae	Example of extant Encalypta specimens
Stereisporites	aulosenensis, cicatricosus, pinoides	Vilhelmsfält Bore No. 1, Karindal bore no. 1	Rydebäck Member	Spores	Sphagnaceae	Example of extant Sphagnum specimens
Taurocusporites	verrucatus	Vilhelmsfält Bore No. 1, Karindal bore no. 1	Rydebäck Member	Spores	Notothyladaceae	

==== Pteridophyta ====
Genus/Family	Species	Stratigraphic position	Member	Material	Notes/Affinities	Images
Apiculatisporites	parvispinosus	Vilhelmsfält Bore No. 1, Karindal bore no. 1	Rydebäck Member	Spores	Zygopteridaceae	
Auritulinasporites	scanicus, triclavis	Vilhelmsfält Bore No. 1, Karindal bore no. 1	Rydebäck Member	Spores	Gleicheniales	Example of extant Gleichenia specimens
Baculatisporites	comaumensis	Vilhelmsfält Bore No. 1, Karindal bore no. 1	Rydebäck Member	Spores	Osmundaceae	Example of extant Osmunda specimens
Calamospora	mesozoica	Vilhelmsfält Bore No. 1, Karindal bore no. 1	Rydebäck Member	Spores	Calamitaceae	Reconstruction of the Genus Calamites
Cepulina	truncata	Vilhelmsfält Bore No. 1, Karindal bore no. 1	Rydebäck Member	Spores	Selaginellaceae	Extant Selaginella
Ceratosporites	spinosus	Vilhelmsfält Bore No. 1, Karindal bore no. 1	Rydebäck Member	Spores	Selaginellaceae	
Cibotiumspora	jurienensis	Vilhelmsfält Bore No. 1, Karindal bore no. 1	Rydebäck Member	Spores	Cyatheaceae	Example of extant Cyathea
Cingutriletes	sp.	Vilhelmsfält Bore No. 1, Karindal bore no. 1	Rydebäck Member	Spores	Pteridophyta	
Conbaculatisporites	mesozoicus	Vilhelmsfält Bore No. 1, Karindal bore no. 1	Rydebäck Member	Spores	Pteridophyta	
Coniopteris	hymenophylloides	West of Heiligendamm	Katslösa Member	Single Leaflet	Polypodiidae	Specimen
Contignisporites	dunrobinensis, problematicus	Vilhelmsfält Bore No. 1, Karindal bore no. 1	Rydebäck Member	Spores	Pteridaceae	Example of extant Pityrogramma specimens
Converrucosisporites	sp sp. nov.	Vilhelmsfält Bore No. 1, Karindal bore no. 1	Rydebäck Member	Spores	Pteridophyta	
Convolutispora	sp.	Vilhelmsfält Bore No. 1, Karindal bore no. 1	Rydebäck Member	Spores	Pteridophyta	
Cyathidites	australis, concavus, minor	Vilhelmsfält Bore No. 1, Karindal bore no. 1	Rydebäck Member	Spores	Cyatheaceae	
Densoisporites	crassus, erdtmanii, scanicus, velatus	Vilhelmsfält Bore No. 1, Karindal bore no. 1	Rydebäck Member	Spores	Selaginellaceae	
Dictyophyllidites	harrisii	Vilhelmsfält Bore No. 1, Karindal bore no. 1	Rydebäck Member	Spores	Dipteridaceae	Example of extant Dipteris specimens
Enzolasporites	manifestus, vigens	Vilhelmsfält Bore No. 1, Karindal bore no. 1	Rydebäck Member	Spores	Cyatheaceae	
Foveosporites	moretonensis, foveoreticulatus	Vilhelmsfält Bore No. 1, Karindal bore no. 1	Rydebäck Member	Spores	Lycopodiaceae	Extant Lycopodium specimens
Gleicheniidites	senonicus, umbonatus	Vilhelmsfält Bore No. 1, Karindal bore no. 1	Rydebäck Member	Spores	Gleicheniales	
Heliosporites	altmarkensis	Vilhelmsfält Bore No. 1, Karindal bore no. 1	Rydebäck Member	Spores	Selaginellaceae	
Ischyosporites	sp. Guy-.,1986 sp. nov., variegatus	Vilhelmsfält Bore No. 1, Karindal bore no. 1	Rydebäck Member	Spores	Pteridophyta	
Laevigatisporites	sp.	Vilhelmsfält Bore No. 1, Karindal bore no. 1	Rydebäck Member	Spores	Pteridophyta	
Leptolepidites	bossus, equatibossus, macroverrucosus, major, paverus, rotundus, sp.1 sp. nov., sp.2 sp. nov.	Vilhelmsfält Bore No. 1, Karindal bore no. 1	Rydebäck Member	Spores	Dennstaedtiaceae	
Lophotriletes	verrucosus	Vilhelmsfält Bore No. 1, Karindal bore no. 1	Rydebäck Member	Spores	Botryopteridaceae	
Lycopodiacidites	rugulatus	Vilhelmsfält Bore No. 1, Karindal bore no. 1	Rydebäck Member	Spores	Ophioglossaceae	Example of extant Helminthostachys specimens
Lycopodiumsporites	clavatoides, pseudoreticulatus, reticulumsporites, semimuris, vilhelmii, sp., sp sp. nov., sp.1 sp. nov., sp.2 sp. nov.	Vilhelmsfält Bore No. 1, Karindal bore no. 1	Rydebäck Member	Spores	Lycopodiaceae	
Lycospora	salebrosacea	Vilhelmsfält Bore No. 1, Karindal bore no. 1	Rydebäck Member	Spores	Lycopodiaceae	
Marattisporites	scabratus	Vilhelmsfält Bore No. 1, Karindal bore no. 1	Rydebäck Member	Spores	Marattiaceae	Example of extant Marattia specimens
Matonisporites	crassiangulatus, sp.	Vilhelmsfält Bore No. 1, Karindal bore no. 1	Rydebäck Member	Spores	Matoniaceae	Example of extant Matonia specimens
Neoraistrickia	truncata, sp sp. nov.	Vilhelmsfält Bore No. 1, Karindal bore no. 1	Rydebäck Member	Spores	Selaginellaceae	
Osmundacidites	wellmanii	Vilhelmsfält Bore No. 1, Karindal bore no. 1	Rydebäck Member	Spores	Osmundaceae	Example of extant Osmunda specimens
Platyptera	sp.1 Guy-.,1986 sp. nov., sp.2 sp. nov.	Vilhelmsfält Bore No. 1, Karindal bore no. 1	Rydebäck Member	Spores	Pteridophyta	
Semiretisporis	cf. gothae	Vilhelmsfält Bore No. 1, Karindal bore no. 1	Rydebäck Member	Spores	Lycopodiaceae	
Sestrosporites	pseudoalveolatus	Vilhelmsfält Bore No. 1, Karindal bore no. 1	Rydebäck Member	Spores	Lycopodiaceae	
Simozonotriletes	arcuatus	Vilhelmsfält Bore No. 1, Karindal bore no. 1	Rydebäck Member	Spores	Pteridophyta	
Tigrisporites	microrugulatus	Vilhelmsfält Bore No. 1, Karindal bore no. 1	Rydebäck Member	Spores	Pteridophyta	
Todisporites	granulatus, major, minor	Vilhelmsfält Bore No. 1, Karindal bore no. 1	Rydebäck Member	Spores	Osmundaceae	
Trachysporites	fuscus, asper, sp sp. nov.	Vilhelmsfält Bore No. 1, Karindal bore no. 1	Rydebäck Member	Spores	Pteridophyta	
Uvaesporites	argenteaeformis, puzzlei, sp.	Vilhelmsfält Bore No. 1, Karindal bore no. 1	Rydebäck Member	Spores	Selaginellaceae	
Verrucosisporites	obscurilaesuratus	Vilhelmsfält Bore No. 1, Karindal bore no. 1	Rydebäck Member	Spores	Pteridophyta	
Zebrasporites	interscriptus	Vilhelmsfält Bore No. 1, Karindal bore no. 1	Rydebäck Member	Spores	Cyatheaceae	

==== Conifers ====
Genus/Family	Species	Stratigraphic position	Member	Material	Notes/Affinities	Images
Araucariacites	australis	Vilhelmsfält Bore No. 1, Karindal bore no. 1	Rydebäck Member	Pollen	Araucariaceae	Extant Araucaria
Brachysaccus	microsaccus	Vilhelmsfält Bore No. 1, Karindal bore no. 1	Rydebäck Member	Pollen	Pinopsida	
Callialasporites	dampieri, turbatus	Vilhelmsfält Bore No. 1, Karindal bore no. 1	Rydebäck Member	Pollen	Araucariaceae	
Cerebropollenites	mesozoicus	Vilhelmsfält Bore No. 1, Karindal bore no. 1	Rydebäck Member	Pollen	Pinaceae	Extant Picea
Classopollis	classoides	Vilhelmsfält Bore No. 1, Karindal bore no. 1	Rydebäck Member	Pollen	Cheirolepidiaceae	
Entylissa	pyriformis, reticulata, tecta	Vilhelmsfält Bore No. 1, Karindal bore no. 1	Rydebäck Member	Pollen	Palissyaceae	
Exesipollenites	tumulus	Vilhelmsfält Bore No. 1, Karindal bore no. 1	Rydebäck Member	Pollen	Cupressaceae	Extant Austrocedrus
Ovalipollis	ovalis	Vilhelmsfält Bore No. 1, Karindal bore no. 1	Rydebäck Member	Pollen	Pinaceae	
Parvisaccites	enigmatus	Vilhelmsfält Bore No. 1, Karindal bore no. 1	Rydebäck Member	Pollen	Podocarpaceae	Extant Podocarpus
Perinopollenites	elatoides	Vilhelmsfält Bore No. 1, Karindal bore no. 1	Rydebäck Member	Pollen	Cupressaceae	
Pinuspollenites	globosaccus, minimus	Vilhelmsfält Bore No. 1, Karindal bore no. 1	Rydebäck Member	Pollen	Pinaceae	
Pityosporites	nigraeformis, scaurus	Vilhelmsfält Bore No. 1, Karindal bore no. 1	Rydebäck Member	Pollen	Pinaceae	
Podocarpidites	ellipticus, sp.	Vilhelmsfält Bore No. 1, Karindal bore no. 1	Rydebäck Member	Pollen	Podocarpaceae	
Spheripollenites	subgranulatus	Vilhelmsfält Bore No. 1, Karindal bore no. 1	Rydebäck Member	Pollen	Cheirolepidiaceae	

==== Ginkgoales ====
Genus/Family	Species	Stratigraphic position	Member	Material	Notes/Affinities	Images
Ginkgoites	acosmia	West of Heiligendamm	Katslösa Member	Single Leaf Impression	Ginkgoaceae	
Ginkgocycadophytus	nitidus, sp.	Vilhelmsfält Bore No. 1, Karindal bore no. 1	Rydebäck Member	Pollen	Ginkgoaceae	

==== Cycadales ====
Genus/Family	Species	Stratigraphic position	Member	Material	Notes/Affinities	Images
Chasmatosporites	apertus, elegans, major, minor, rimatus	Vilhelmsfält Bore No. 1, Karindal bore no. 1	Rydebäck Member	Pollen	Cycadaceae	Extant Encephalartos laevifolius

==== Seed Ferns ====
Genus/Family	Species	Stratigraphic position	Member	Material	Notes/Affinities	Images
Alisporites	robustus	Vilhelmsfält Bore No. 1, Karindal bore no. 1	Rydebäck Member	Pollen	Umkomasiaceae	
Aratisporites	palettae	Vilhelmsfält Bore No. 1, Karindal bore no. 1	Rydebäck Member	Pollen	Caytoniaceae	
Protopinus	scanicus, sp. sp nov	Vilhelmsfält Bore No. 1, Karindal bore no. 1	Rydebäck Member	Pollen	Caytoniaceae	
Vitreisporites	pallidus	Vilhelmsfält Bore No. 1, Karindal bore no. 1	Rydebäck Member	Pollen	Caytoniaceae	

==== Erdtmanithecales ====
Genus/Family	Species	Stratigraphic position	Member	Material	Notes/Affinities	Images
Eucommiidites	troedssonii, major	Vilhelmsfält Bore No. 1, Karindal bore no. 1	Rydebäck Member	Pollen	Erdtmanithecales	

== See also ==
- List of fossiliferous stratigraphic units in Sweden
- Kristianstad Basin
- Toarcian formations
- Djupadal Formation, Central Skane
- Marne di Monte Serrone, Italy
- Calcare di Sogno, Italy
- Mizur Formation, North Caucasus
- Sachrang Formation, Austria
- Saubach Formation, Austria
- Posidonia Shale, Lagerstätte in Germany
- Ciechocinek Formation, Germany and Poland
- Krempachy Marl Formation, Poland and Slovakia
- Lava Formation, Lithuania
