= Röddinge Formation =

Geologic formation in Sweden

- Stratigraphic range: Late Sinemurian-Late Toarcian; ~195–175 Ma
- Type: Formation
- Unit of: Vomb Trough
- Underlies: Mariedal Formation; Annero Formation
- Overlies: Unknown Hettangian deposits
- Thickness: Up to 300 m (980 ft)

Lithology
- Primary: Limonite and Chamosite-cemented Quartz arenites containing abundant chamosite ooids.
- Other: Berthierine, Siderite and Iron ooids.

Location
- Region: East Skåne County
- Country: Sweden

Type section
- Named for: Röddinge
- Röddinge Formation (Sweden)

The Röddinge Formation is a geologic formation in Skåne County, southern Sweden. It is Early Jurassic (Sinemurian-Toarcian) in age. It is a unit with a limited degree of exposure, being identified mostly by its deposits on the Fyledalen Fault Zone, specially on Kurremölla, where the main fossil deposit is present. It is a unit known mostly for large museum collections and estimated to have a thickness of several hundred meters. It is also known for its large iron deposits. It is correlated with the mostly marine Rya Formation of western Skåne County, the Volcanic deposits of the Djupadal Formation and specially the Sorthat Formation of Bornholm. Most likely, the coarse-grained nature of the Röddinge Formation is linked to rapid erosion of a tectonically active hinterland.

== Lithology ==
A profile up to 300 m thick was described in 1968 from the Eriksdal-Kurremölla area, dated Pliensbachian-Toarcian. The Pliensbachian levels where dominated by sands and sandstones of marine origin, hosting a highly fossiliferous bed containing a rich mollusc fauna. A Sinemurian layer assigned to the formation was also found on other works. The Röddinge formation has a great abundance of Limonite and Chamosite quartz arenites, fine-to medium-grained, with subordinate thin conglomerates. Sediments related to the unit are found consolidated by Berthierine or Siderite cement, with berthierine oolites being common in the layers. These ooids are rather small in most of the successions, around 0.3 mm in diameter and ellipsoidal in shape, having cores composed of detrital quartz or heavy minerals. The deposits of the formation evidence strong degradation by modern weathering and have a red, brown or yellow stain (iron hydroxides). The deposits not affected by erosion are known from boreholes and host greyish dark green facies due to the content of berthierine and siderite. The iron contents differ based on the weathering grade of the layers: on weathered sandstones is about 8–10%, then is in up to 20% in the oolites, and finally at the major fossiliferous deposit on Kurremölla a 1.7 m thick oolite bed has an iron content of up to 35%. Owing to this high content in iron, the Kurremölla locality was mined from 1930 to 1937, although there was not enough iron supply and enrichments were too dispersed in the source rock, which led to it not being economically viable to maintain the mining process for very long. The presence of mostly poor exposures has made mostly impossible to do detailed facies analysis, although it is suggested that the sediments come from prolonged reworking.

== Fossils ==
The Röddinge formation is considered mostly a coeval developing unit with the Jurassic formations of Bornholm, as both where connected as part of the Fennoscandian mainland. The unit is considered to be part of the fluvial to deltaic system found also or Bornholm. However, as happened on the Hasle Formation, the Röddinge formation hosted a major marine ingression at least on the Lower-Middle Pliensbachian (jamesoni subzone), with both sharing the Ammonite fauna and the ecosystems. The main fossiliferous content of the formation comes from marine influence, clearly indicated by finds of ammonites and crinoids. After this event, in the Toarcian the formation developed along the Sorthat Formation, forming both part of the large deltaic system that ended on northern Germany. There is also suggestions that towards the west a lake system was developed, covering the marine basin after the local Late Pliensbachian-Lower Toarcian regression. This lake system is evidenced on several boreholes, and was probably developed on the western lateral of the major fluvial system recorded locally and on Bornholm. Like the Sorthat Formation, this upper unit also hosts possible coal beds. Both, the lake and the fluvial system layers host iron ooids that indicate diagenetic precipitation, prior to and during sediment compaction. This is also found on the Rydebäck and Katslösa Members of the Rya Formation, and has been suggested that the volcanic activity developed on the coeval Djupadal Formation may have stimulated the process.

=== Annelida ===
Genus	Species	Location	Level	Environment	Material	Notes	References	Images
Serpula	S. terquemi	Kurremölla	Jamesoni Zone, Lower Pliensbachian	High energy marginal marine derived from sea ingression	Trace fossils; polychaete encrusters in rock	A sessile, marine annelid tube worm of the family Serpulidae. The holotype of this species was found on this layers, is also recovered on coeval strata of the Rya Formation.		Head of a modern Serpula vermicularis

=== Echinodermata ===
Genus	Species	Location	Level	Environment	Material	Notes	References	Images
Pentacrinites	P. subteroides; P. patulus; P. cf. basaltiformis; P. cf. subteroides; P. sp.	Kurremölla	Jamesoni Zone, Lower Pliensbachian	High energy marginal marine derived from sea ingression	Columnals	A Crinoid, type member of the family Pentacrinitidae inside Isocrinida. A great amount of specimens are known from the layers, showing mostly of them signs of being washed by marine currents.		Reconstructed specimens

=== Bivalves ===
Genus	Species	Location	Level	Environment	Material	Notes	References	Images
Astarte	A. angelini; A. fructuum; A. deltoidea; A. erdmanni	Kurremölla; Rödmölla	Cardium Bank, Middle Pliensbachian	Low energy and scarce depth nearshore settings	Shells	A marine clam, type member of the family Astartidae inside Carditida. The holotype of A. angelini and A. deltoidea was identified on Kurremölla.		
Avicula	A. lecta; A. anserina	Rödmölla	Cardium Bank, Middle Pliensbachian	Low energy and scarce depth nearshore settings	Shells	A marine pearl oyster, member of the family Pteriidae inside Ostreida.		
Entolium	E. lundgreni	Kurremölla; Rödmölla	Cardium Bank, Middle Pliensbachian	Low energy and scarce depth nearshore settings	Shells	A marine scallop, type member of the family Entoliidae inside Pectinida.		
Grammatodon	G. cypriniformis	Kurremölla	Cardium Bank, Middle Pliensbachian	Low energy and scarce depth nearshore settings	Shells	A marine clam, member of the family Parallelodontidae inside Arcida.		
Homomya	H. librata	Kurremölla	Jamesoni Zone, Lower Pliensbachian	High energy marginal marine derived from sea ingression	Shells	A marine clam, member of the family Pholadomyidae inside Pholadomyida.		
Oxytoma	O. inaequivalvis	Kurremölla; Kullemölla	Jamesoni Zone, Lower Pliensbachian	High energy marginal marine derived from sea ingression	Shells	A marine scallop, type member of the family Oxytomidae inside Pectinida.		
Palaeoneilo	P. bornholmiensis	Kurremölla; Kullemölla	Jamesoni Zone, Lower Pliensbachian	High energy marginal marine derived from sea ingression	Shells	A marine clam, incertae sedis inside Nuculanida. This species is known from Kurremölla and Kullemölla as well as on the Hasle Formation of the island of Bornholm, correlating both coeval deposits.		
Pseudomonotis	P. oblonga	Rödmölla	Cardium Bank, Middle Pliensbachian	Low energy and scarce depth nearshore settings	Shells	A marine scallop, type member of the family Pseudomonotidae inside Pectinida.		
Rollieria	R. bronni	Kurremölla	Jamesoni Zone, Lower Pliensbachian	High energy marginal marine derived from sea ingression	Shells	A marine clam, incertae sedis inside Nuculanida. A lower jurassic genus pretty abundant on Kurremölla, more than on any other deposit on Skane.		
Sphaeriola	S. kurremolinae	Kurremölla	Jamesoni Zone, Lower Pliensbachian	High energy marginal marine derived from sea ingression	Shells	A marine clam, member of the family Lucinidae inside Lucinida. As the species name suggest, was found first on Kurremölla		
Tancredia	T. lineata	Kurremölla; Rödmölla	Jamesoni Zone, Lower Pliensbachian	High energy marginal marine derived from sea ingression	Shells	A marine clam, type member of the family Tancrediidae inside Carditida.		
Terquemia	T. arietis	Kurremölla	Cardium Bank, Middle Pliensbachian	Low energy and scarce depth nearshore settings	Shells	A marine scallop, member of the family Prospondylidea inside Pterioida.		
Trigonia	T. primaeva	Kurremölla; Rödmölla	Cardium Bank, Middle Pliensbachian	Low energy and scarce depth nearshore settings	Shells	A marine clam, type member of the family Trigoniidae inside Trigoniida. Was first identified from Kurremölla but named from coeval specimens found on the Rya Formation.		
Tutcheria	T. cingulata	Kurremölla	Cardium Bank, Middle Pliensbachian	Low energy and scarce depth nearshore settings	Shells	A marine clam, member of the family Carditidae inside Carditida. Mistake as Cardium sp., is the most abundant genus on the layer of the same name.		

=== Gastropoda ===
Genus	Species	Location	Level	Environment	Material	Notes	References	Images
Turbo	T. solarium	Kurremölla; Kullemölla; Rödmölla	Jamesoni Zone, Lower Pliensbachian	High energy marginal marine derived from sea ingression	Shells	A marine Snail, type member of the family Turbinidae inside Turbinoidea.		

=== Cephalopoda ===
Genus	Species	Location	Level	Environment	Material	Notes	References	Images
Polymorphites	P. sp. indet.	Kurremölla; Kullemölla; Rödmölla	Jamesoni Zone, Lower Pliensbachian	High energy marginal marine derived from sea ingression	Shells	An ammonite, type member of the family Polymorphitidae inside Ammonitida.		
Pseudohastites	P. charmouthensis	Kurremölla	Jamesoni Zone, Lower Pliensbachian	High energy marginal marine derived from sea ingression	Shells	A belemnite, member of the family Passaloteuthididae inside Belemnitida.		
Uptonia	U. jamesoni; U. angusta; U. sp. juv	Kurremölla; Kullemölla; Rödmölla	Jamesoni Zone, Lower Pliensbachian	High energy marginal marine derived from sea ingression	Shells	An ammonite, member of the family Polymorphitidae inside Ammonitida. The main indicator of a coeval sea ingression.		

=== Chondrichthyes ===
Genus	Species	Location	Level	Environment	Material	Notes	References	Images
Acrodus	A. nobilis	Kurremölla; Rödmölla	Jamesoni Zone, Lower Pliensbachian	High energy marginal marine derived from sea ingression	Teeth	A marine/brackish shark, type member of the family Acrodontidae inside Hybodontiformes. Indicator of marine conditions locally		

== See also ==
- List of fossiliferous stratigraphic units in Sweden
- Kristianstad Basin
- Toarcian formations
- Rya Formation, Sweden
- Marne di Monte Serrone, Italy
- Calcare di Sogno, Italy
- Sachrang Formation, Austria
- Saubach Formation, Austria
- Posidonia Shale, Lagerstätte in Germany
- Ciechocinek Formation, Germany and Poland
- Krempachy Marl Formation, Poland and Slovakia
- Lava Formation, Lithuania
