= Mizur Formation =

Geologic formation in Russia

- Stratigraphic range: Late Pliensbachian; ~183 Ma Domerian Substage
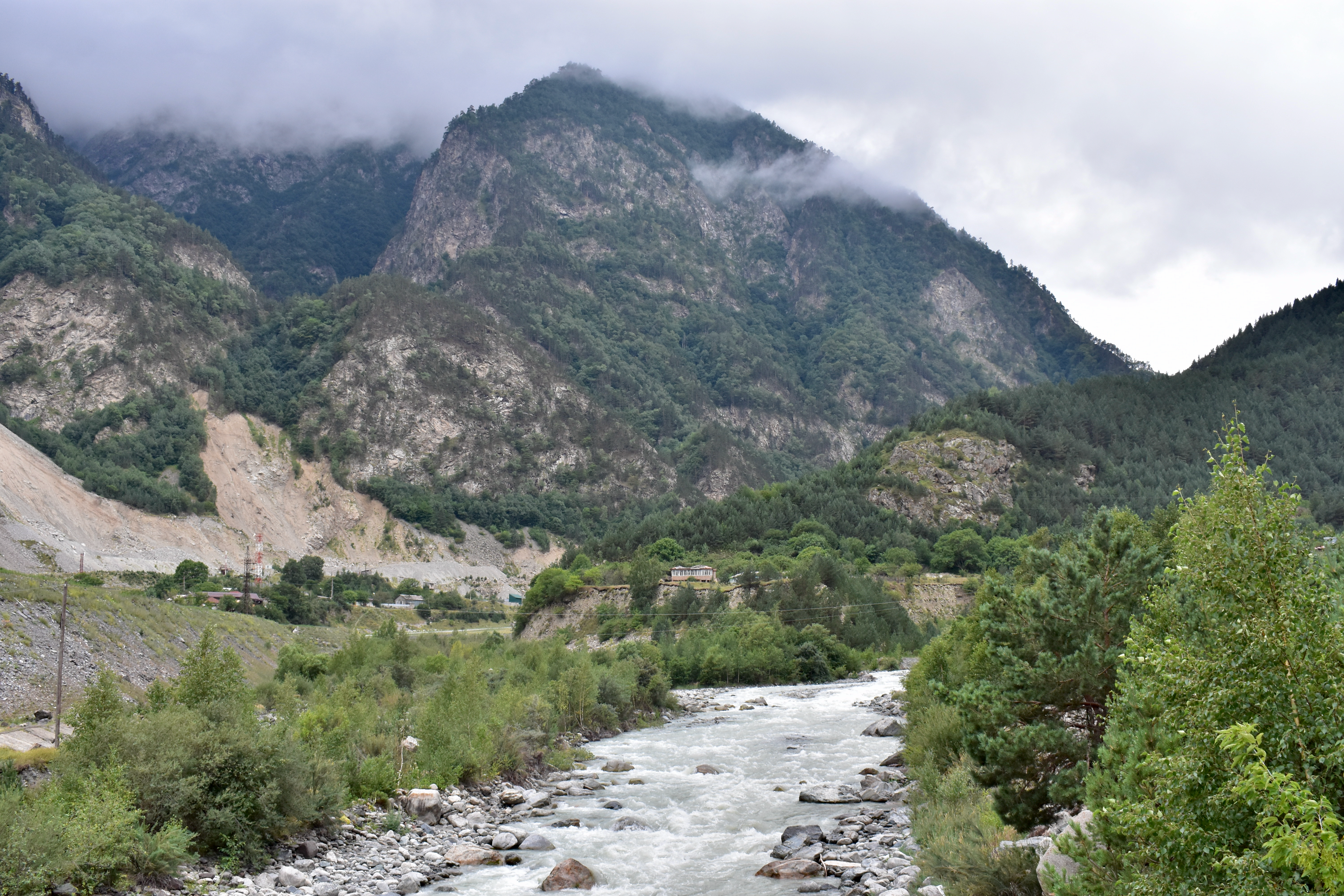
- Ardon River, where exposed layers of the formation are recovered
- Type: Geological Formation
- Sub-units: Fytyn, Faraskat and Mizur members
- Underlies: Unnamed Toarcian-Aalenian Layers
- Overlies: Sadon Formation

Lithology
- Primary: Sandstone
- Other: Kaolinite, conglomerates, gravelstones, quartzsandstones

Location
- Coordinates: 42°51'02.1"N 44°03'25.3"E
- Region: North Ossetia–Alania
- Country: Russia

Type section
- Named for: The Town of Mizur
- Named by: Beznosov
- Mizur Formation (Russia)

The Mizur Formation is a geological formation that outcrops in North Ossetia–Alania in the North Caucasus, representing a series of marginal marine to coastal layers with terrestrial influence. It is of Late Pliensbachian (Lower Jurassic) age. It is notable as the only major unit with preserved dinosaur footprints of various orders not yet ascribed to any concrete ichnogenus.

== Stratigraphy ==
=== Fytyn Member ===
The Fytyn member represent the older layers of the formation, and depending on the outcrop, it overlies the eroded surface of Paleozoic granites or crystalline schists, or the Sinemurian–lower Pliensbachian volcanosedimentary rocks of the Sadon Formation. This member is composed mostly of the product of the regional erosion of older layers — conglomerates, gravelstones, quartz sandstones, and others — that were deposited in a mostly continental setting. It is up to a few dozen meters thick.

=== Faraskat Member ===
In some outcrops the Fytyn Member is absent, as result of a regional uplift, with the sedimentary material transported from this area to central parts of the Greater Caucasus. Such material ended up accumulating on the Kistin Formation (Sinemurian–lower Pliensbachian), a unit that underlies in some sections the Faraskat Member. The Faraskat section began its deposition when the local layers were accompanied by a slow subsidence of the land and sedimentation on the previously denuded area. The Faraskat sequence represents the first proper coastal deposit in the unit and is composed by a mixture of coarse material, as well as wood fragments and siderite, with some layers being highly bioturbated.

=== Mizur Member ===
The transition between the Faraskat and Mizur members is gradual, forming a large sedimentary cycle from clayey to sandstone-dominated rocks. This layer represents the last unit of the formation and is dominated by fine-grained sandstone horizons, often low-angle crossbedding and scarce fine ripple marks, in contrast to the abundant large wave ripples. This layers have abundant fragments of terrestrial vegetation in a highly oxidized state. The sedimentation peculiarities of the Mizur layers indicate their accumulation within a relatively wide and shallow shelf. This layer is the only that has provided dinosaur footprints, as well ammonites and other invertebrates.

== Environment ==
The Mizur Member contains numerous fragments of plants — stems, wood, and leaves — suggesting a clear influence of nearby emerged settings. The vegetation in the coeval exposures along the Caucasus and adjacent regions were covered by coniferous forests with abundant underliying Bennettitales. The spores and pollen in the sediments are dominated by bennettitales, which likely grew on nearshore lowlands. The region hosts pollen of several plant groups, notably the Pinaceae, Podocarpaceae, Araucariaceae, with other such as Ginkgoaceae being less common. Beyond trees, the lowlands were covered by thermophilic ferns (Cibotium, Matonia, Coniopteris), lycophytes (Selaginella), and horsetails (Neocalamites). Invertebrate faunas are linked with the Mediterranean faunal region, with isotope ratios in some specimens (belemnites and brachiopods) yielding estimated average annual temperatures in the North Caucasian–Transcaucasian region of 21.4–23.5 °C; that is, a subtropical humid climate.

== Fossil content ==
=== Ammonites ===
Genus	Species	Location	Section	Material	Notes	Images
Amaltheus	A. spp.; A. margaritatus	Urukh river; Ardon river; Fiagdon river	Mizur Member	Isolated shells; Fragments of shells	An ammonite, type member of the family Amaltheidae within Ammonitida. This genus is the main one used to gauge the depositional age of the local layers.	Amaltheus margaritatus specimen

=== Dinosauria ===
Genus	Species	Location	Section	Material	Notes	Images
Dinosauropedida	Indeterminate	Ardon river	Mizur Member	Footprints	Dinosaur footprints, unassigned to any concrete ichnogenus. A poorly preserved trackway composed of three tracks whose appearance is completely different to that of any other specimen recovered from the unit.	
Carnosauripodoidei	Indeterminate	Ardon river	Mizur Member	Footprints	Possible tetanuran footprints, unassigned to any concrete ichnogenus. A relatively large single dinosaur track (35‒40 cm wide), its distinctive fingerprints diverging at an angle of 30°‒35° are characteristic of large Jurassic predatory theropods.	Medium theropods similar to Piatnitzkysaurus may have left these footprints
Ornithischipida	Indeterminate	Ardon river	Mizur Member	Footprints	Possible ornithischian footprints, unassigned to any concrete ichnogenus. A series of tracks whose relatively small size (15 cm) and the close position of the left and right limbs suggest they belong to a small herbivorous ornithopod	Small ornithischians similar to Lesothosaurus may have left these footprints
Sauropodomorphidia	Indeterminate	Ardon river	Mizur Member	Footprints	Possible sauropodomorph footprints, unassigned to any concrete ichnogenus. A clear tridactyl track 12 cm wide is distinguished among several hollows.	Sauropodomorphs similar to Mussaurus may have left these footprints
Theropodipedia	Indeterminate	Ardon river	Mizur Member	Footprints	Possible theropod footprints, unassigned to any concrete ichnogenus. Theropod tracks include several types, from small to medium specimens. Some alterations near the tracks have been interpreted as derived from displaced sediments moved by the dinosaur upper limb during a search for burrowing organisms.	Small theropods similar to Procompsognathus may have left these footprints

== See also ==
- List of fossiliferous stratigraphic units in Russia
- Sorthat Formation, Denmark
- Neringa Formation, Lithuania
- Pliensbachian formations
  - Blanowice Formation, Southern Poland
  - Clarens Formation, South Africa
  - Fernie Formation, Canada
  - Hasle Formation, Denmark
  - Kota Formation, India
  - Los Molles Formation, Argentina
  - Mawson Formation, Antarctica
  - Rotzo Formation, Italy
  - Whiteaves Formation, British Columbia
  - Navajo Sandstone, Utah
  - Kandreho Formation, Madagascar
  - Kota Formation, India
  - Cattamarra Coal Measures, Australia
