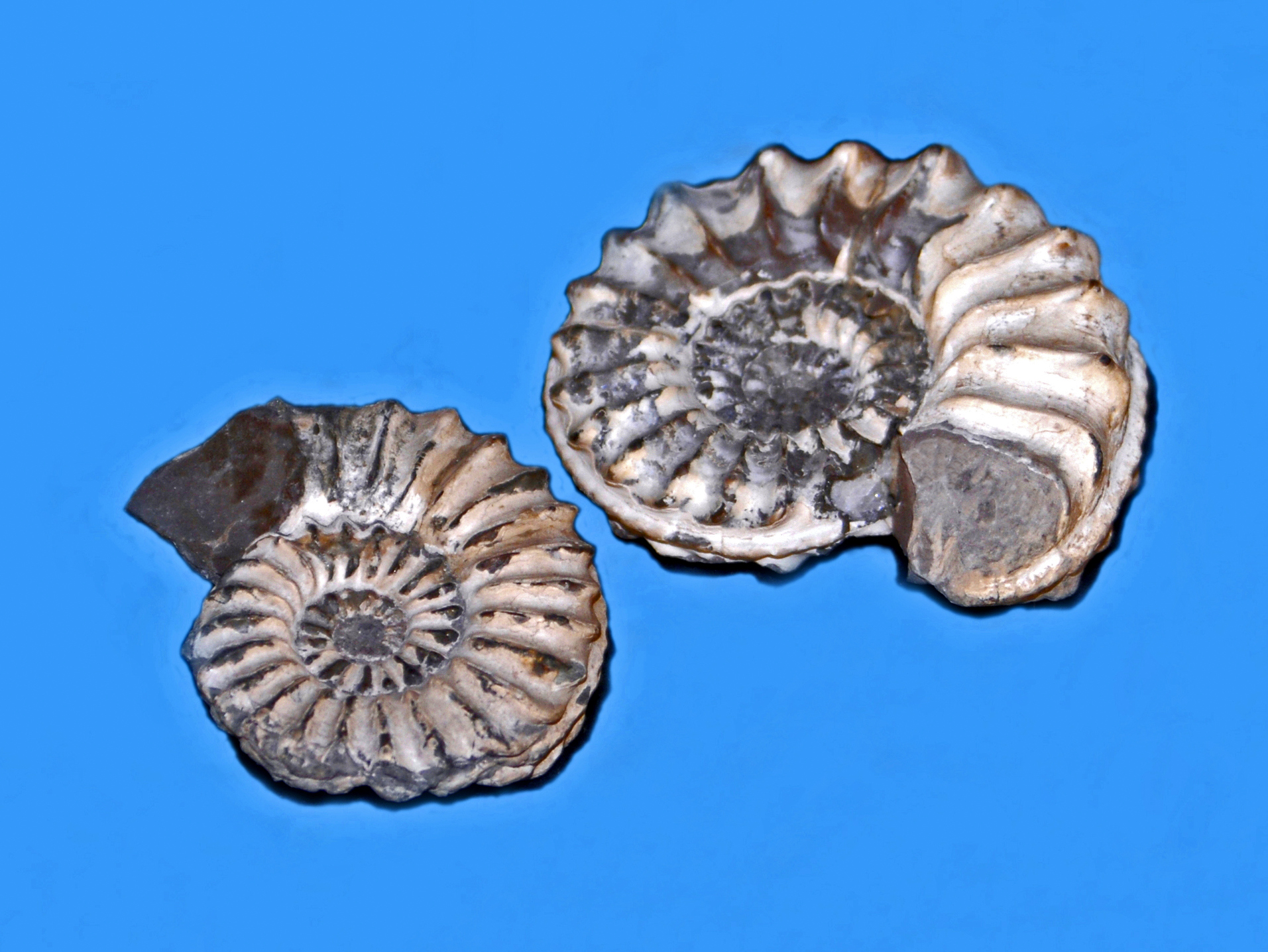
- Fossil shells of Pleuroceras spinatum from Lyme Regis (England), on display at Galerie de paléontologie et d'anatomie comparée in Paris

Scientific classification
- Kingdom: Animalia
- Phylum: Mollusca
- Class: Cephalopoda
- Subclass: †Ammonoidea
- Order: †Ammonitida
- Family: †Amaltheidae
- Genus: †Pleuroceras
- Species: †P. spinatum

Binomial name
- †Pleuroceras spinatum Bruguière 1789

Synonyms
- Ammonites costatus Schlotheim, 1820; Ammonites franconicus Schlotheim, 1813

= Pleuroceras spinatum =

Pleuroceras spinatum Temporal range: Lower Jurassic, 189.6–183 Ma

Species of ammonite (fossil)

Pleuroceras spinatum is a species of ammonite from the lower Jurassic, upper Pliensbachian period (189.6 ± 1.5 – 183.0 ± 1.5 Mya). Species of this genus were fast-moving nektonic carnivore.

== Description ==
Shell of Pleuroceras spinatum can reach a diameter of about 45–54 millimetres (1.8–2.1 in).These ammonites have a planulate shell with a quadrate whorl section, bearing strong radial ribs ending in ventro-lateral tubercles. The venter is tabulate with a strong serrated keel.

== Distribution ==
Fossils of this species have been found in the Jurassic of France, Germany, Hungary, Italy, Serbia and Montenegro, Spain and United Kingdom.
