= Dayiceras =

Dayiceras Temporal range: Pliensbachian

Scientific classification
- Kingdom: Animalia
- Phylum: Mollusca
- Class: Cephalopoda
- Subclass: †Ammonoidea
- Order: †Ammonitida
- Family: †Polymorphitidae
- Genus: †Dayiceras; Spath, 1920

Species
- None cataloged

Genus of molluscs (fossil)

Dayiceras is a finely ribbed polymorphitid eoderoceratacean ammonoid cephalopod from the Jurassic, named by Spath in 1920. The shell is evolute, coiled such that all whorls are exposed. The whorl section is compressed such as to be higher than wide. A row of fine tubercles runs along the middle of the outer rim, the venter.

== Distribution ==
Jurassic deposites of British Columbia and the United Kingdom.
