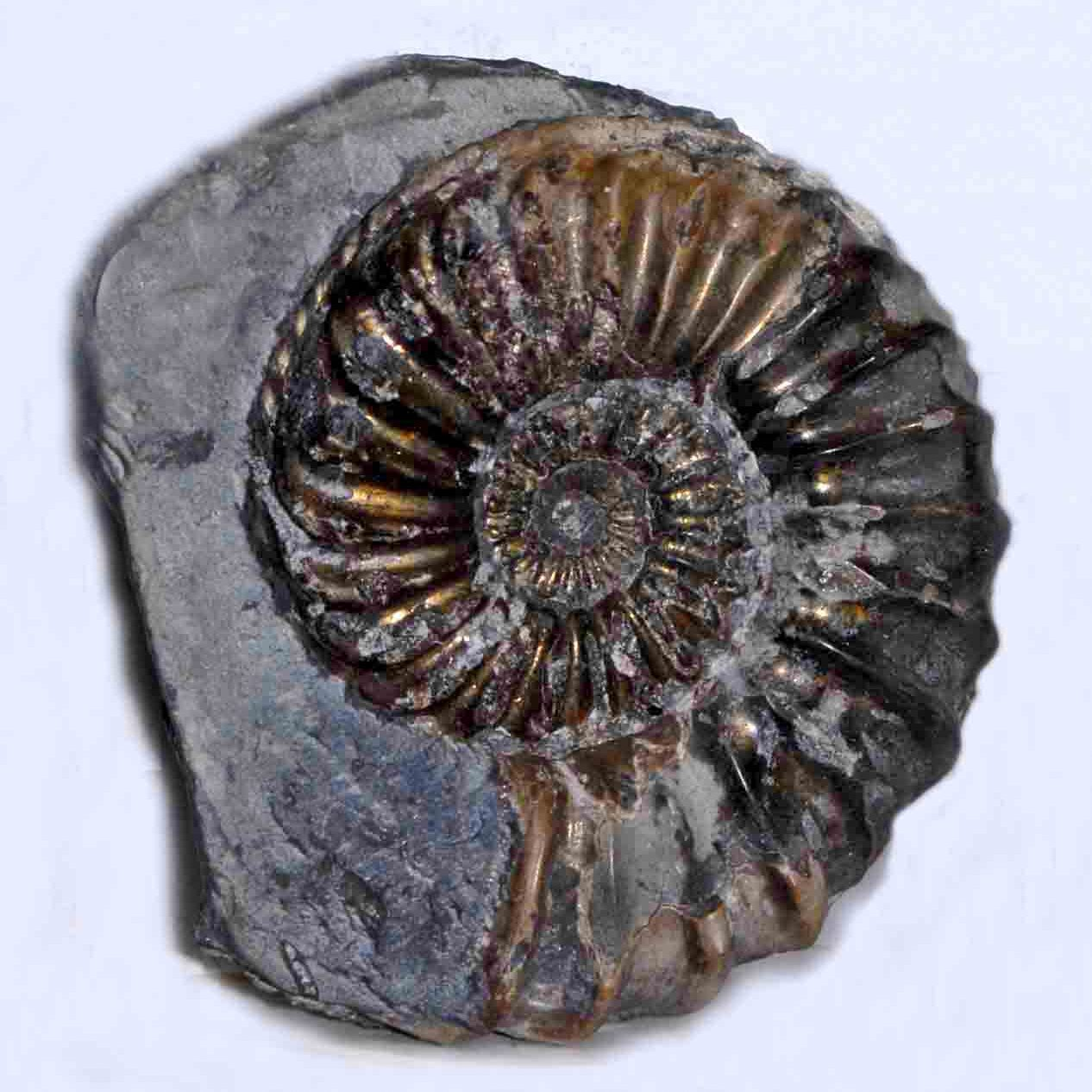

Scientific classification
- Kingdom: Animalia
- Phylum: Mollusca
- Class: Cephalopoda
- Subclass: †Ammonoidea
- Order: †Ammonitida
- Family: †Amaltheidae
- Genus: †Pleuroceras
- Species: †P. solare

Binomial name
- †Pleuroceras solare Phillips, 1829

= Pleuroceras solare =

Pleuroceras solare Temporal range: Lower Jurassic, 189.6–183 Ma

Species of ammonite (fossil)

Pleuroceras solare is a species of ammonite from the lower Jurassic, upper Pliensbachian period (189.6 ± 1.5 – 183.0 ± 1.5 Mya). Species of this genus were fast-moving nektonic carnivores. Shells can reach about 45 mm in diameter.

== Subspecies ==
- Pleuroceras solare solitarium Simpson, 1855
- Pleuroceras solare trapezoidiformis Maubeuge, 1951

== Distribution ==
Fossils of this species have been found in the Jurassic of Algeria, Austria, France, Germany and Spain.
