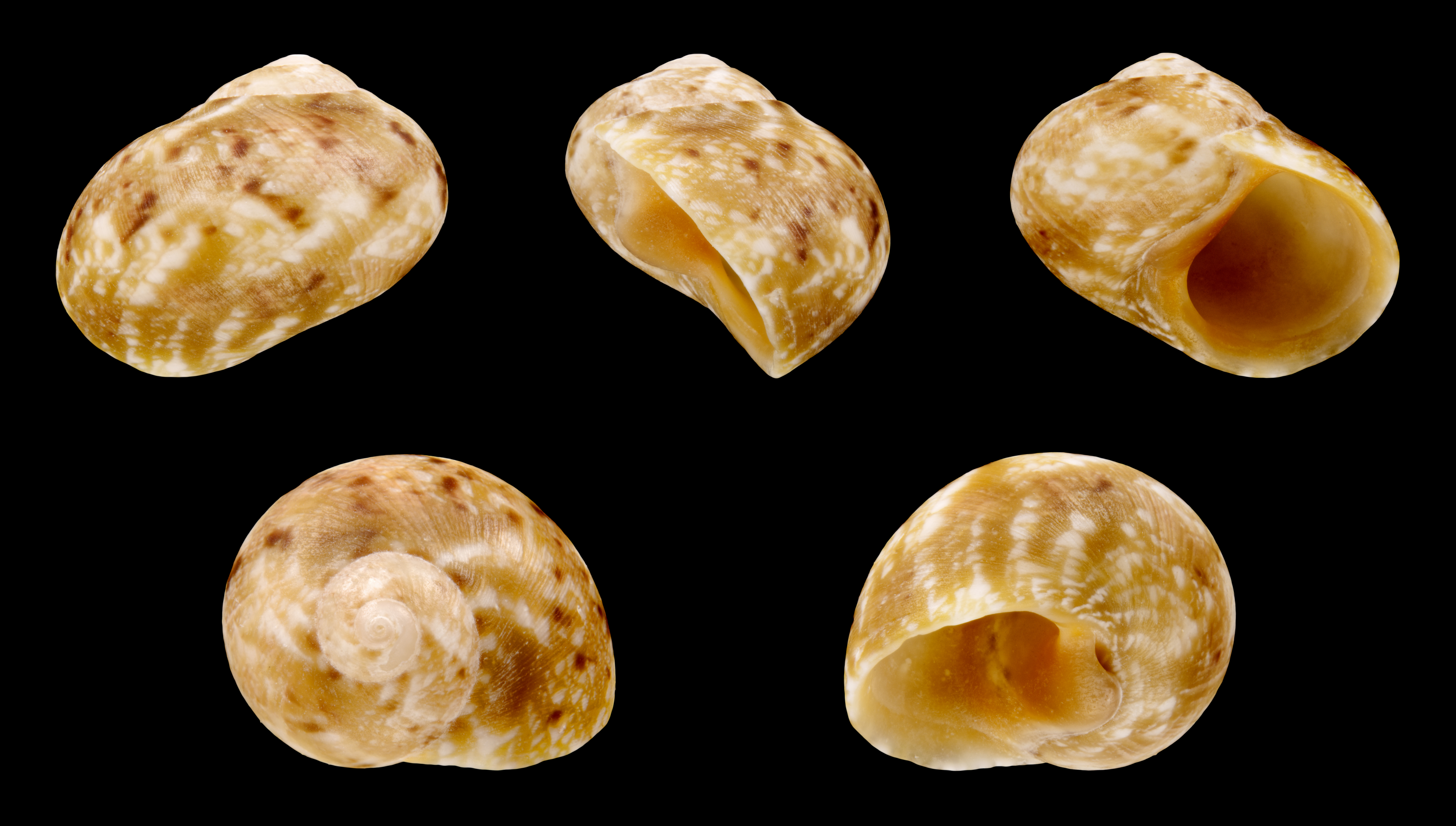
- Five views of a shell of Chrysostoma paradoxum
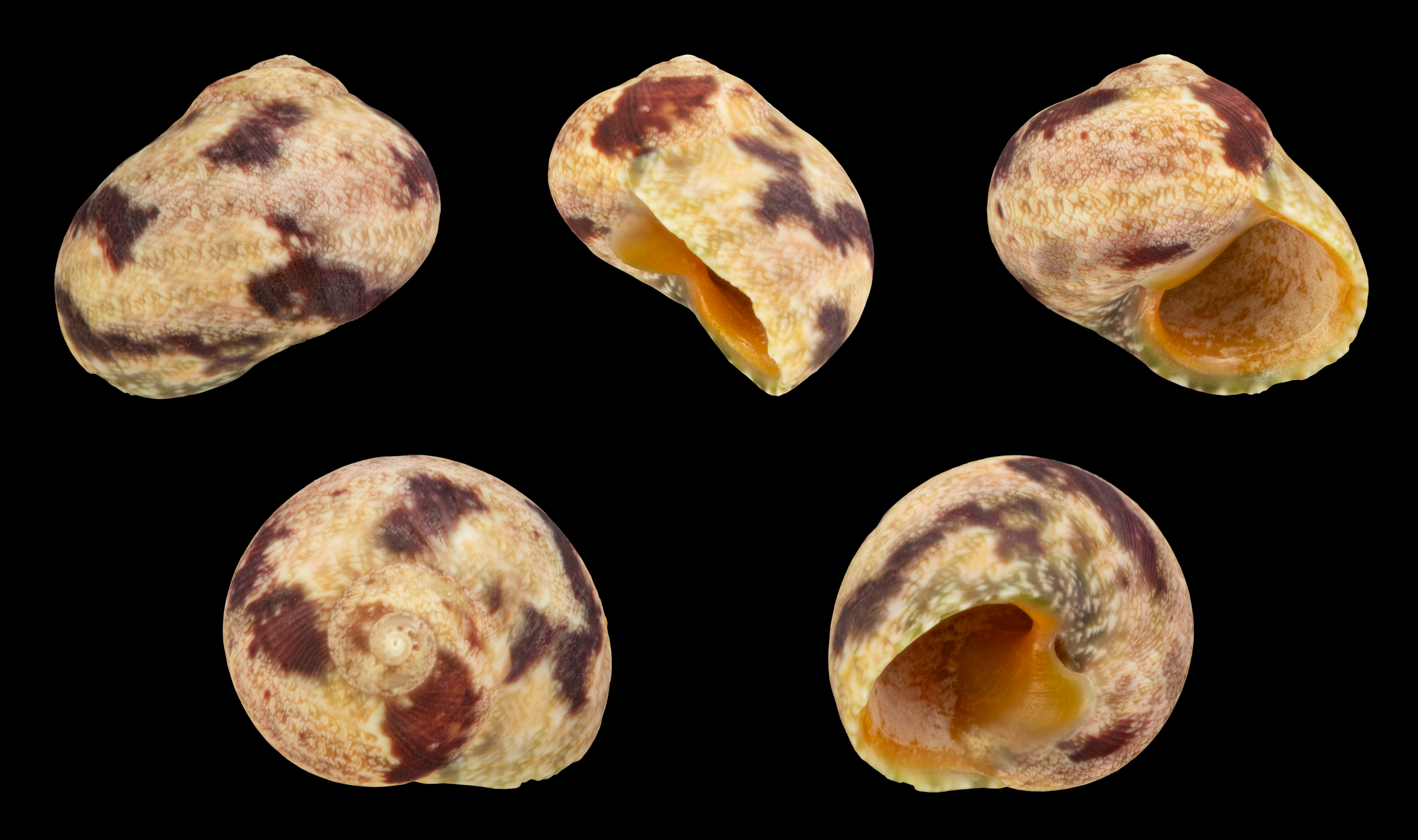

Scientific classification
- Kingdom: Animalia
- Phylum: Mollusca
- Class: Gastropoda
- Subclass: Vetigastropoda
- Order: Trochida
- Superfamily: Trochoidea
- Family: Trochidae
- Genus: Chrysostoma
- Species: C. paradoxum

Binomial name
- Chrysostoma paradoxum (Born, 1778)

Synonyms
- Chrysostoma nicobaricus Chemnitz, J.H., 1781; Helix paradoxa Born, 1778; Turbo nicobaricus Gmelin, 1791

= Chrysostoma paradoxum =

Species of gastropod

Chrysostoma paradoxum, common name the orange-mouthed top shell, is a species of sea snail, a marine gastropod mollusk in the family Trochidae, the top snails.

== Description ==
The length of the shell varies between 18 mm and 21 mm. The globular shell is imperforate or nearly so, thick and strong, with a porcelaneous texture. The surface of the shell is smooth, with scarcely visible lines of growth. The upper whorls are microscopically, and densely, spirally striated. The color of the shell is whitish, closely reticulated and mottled all over with red or pinkish, often with a few large darker maculations above. The spire is very short. The sutures are linear. They are bordered by a slight concavity of the whorl or margination. The six whorls are convex, the last globular. The aperture is half-moon shaped and has a reddish or golden-orange color within. The parietal wall is covered with a very thick orange-colored (rarely crimson) callus, which projects in a short tongue-shaped lobe above the slight, often closed, umbilical perforation.

== Distribution ==
This marine species occurs on corals in the intertidal zone of the East China Sea, off the Philippines, Japan, New Caledonia, Papua New Guinea and Queensland, Australia.
