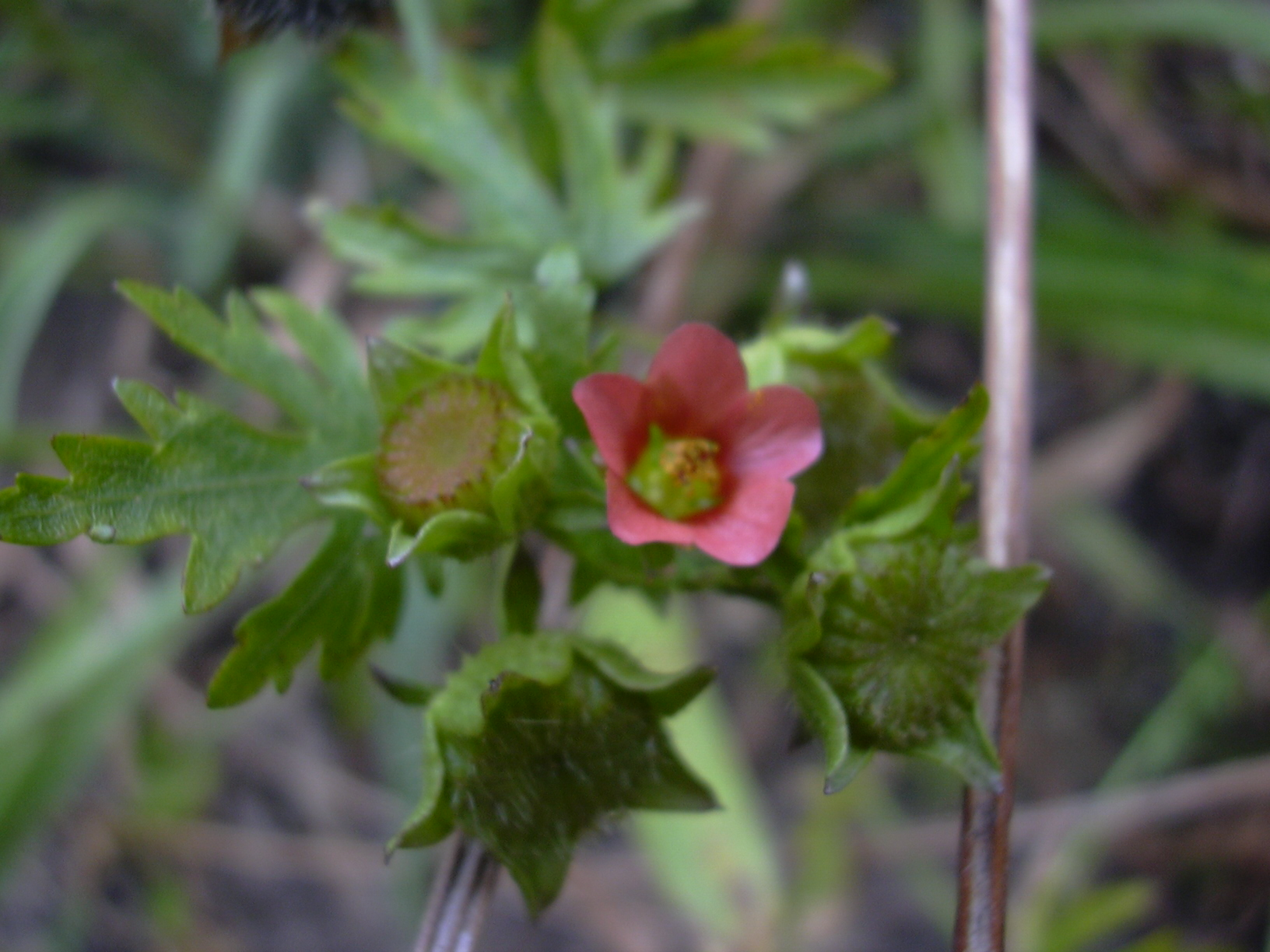

Scientific classification
- Kingdom: Plantae
- Clade: Tracheophytes
- Clade: Angiosperms
- Clade: Eudicots
- Clade: Rosids
- Order: Malvales
- Family: Malvaceae
- Subfamily: Malvoideae
- Tribe: Malveae
- Genus: Modiola; Moench
- Species: M. caroliniana

Binomial name
- Modiola caroliniana (L.) G.Don

= Modiola =

Genus of flowering plants

Modiola is a monotypic genus of plants in the mallow family containing the single species Modiola caroliniana, which is known by several common names including bristly-fruited mallow, Carolina bristlemallow, babosilla, and redflower mallow. It is a creeping perennial which is probably native to South America but which is widely naturalized throughout the tropical and warmer temperate world.

== Ecology ==
Carolina bristlemallow is a grassland plant, commonly occurring in gardens and lawns and in moist habitats such as shores of ponds and reserviors. It can propagate vegetatively by rooting at the nodes, and in Australia, seeds have been reported to germinate from the scats of introduced deer but not those of native kangaroos. It has shown resistance to the herbicide clopyralid.
Carolina bristlemallow is infected by the rust fungus Puccinia modiolae and the chytrid fungus Synchytrium modioliensis.
