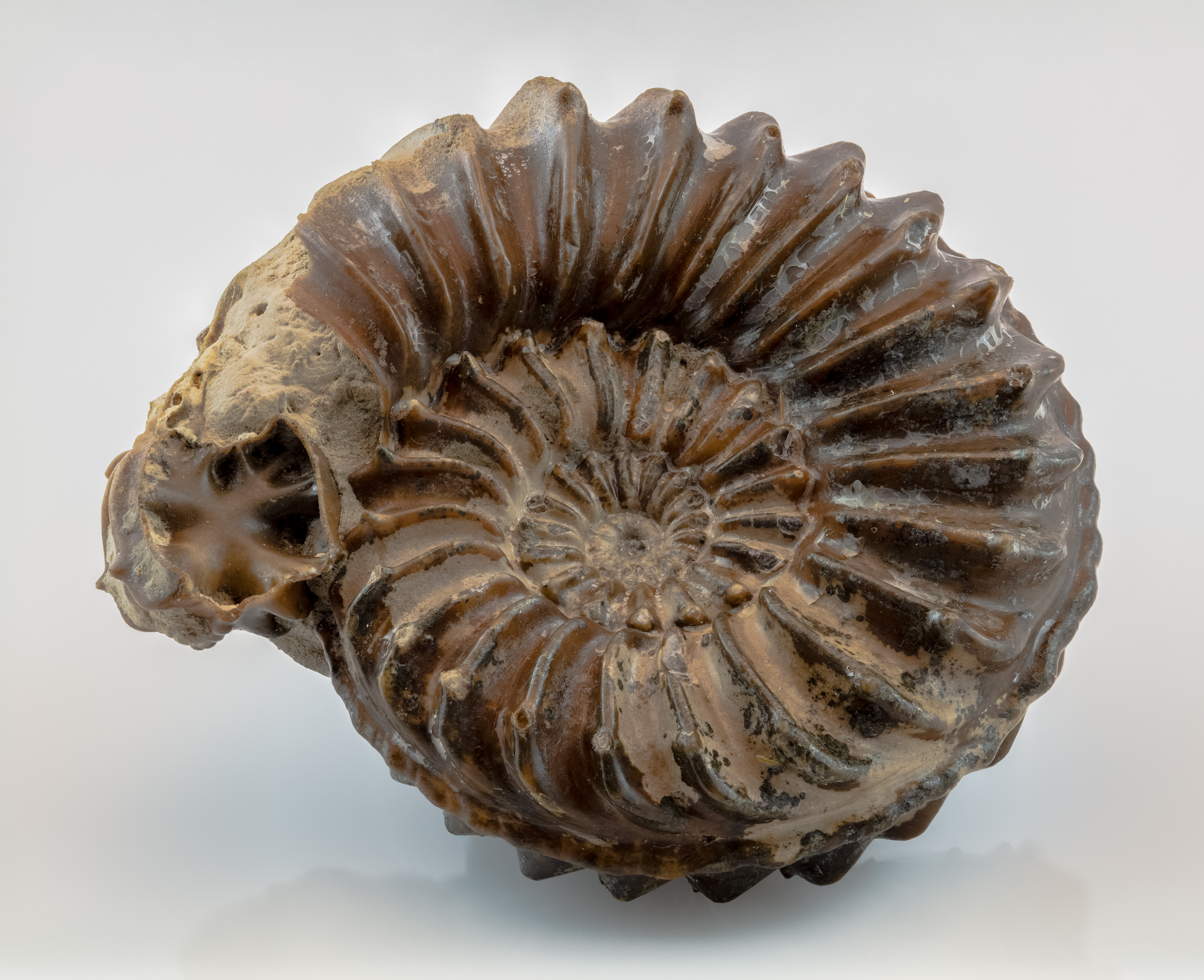
- Pleuroceras quadratum from Germany

Scientific classification
- Kingdom: Animalia
- Phylum: Mollusca
- Class: Cephalopoda
- Subclass: †Ammonoidea
- Order: †Ammonitida
- Family: †Amaltheidae
- Genus: †Pleuroceras; Hyatt, 1868

= Pleuroceras (ammonite) =

Pleuroceras Temporal range: Pliensbachian

Genus of molluscs (fossil)

Pleuroceras is a genus of ammonite from the lower Jurassic, upper Pliensbachian.

== Species ==
- Pleuroceras hawskerense (Young & Bird, 1828)
- Pleuroceras solare (Phillips, 1829)
- Pleuroceras spinatum (Bruguière, 1789)
- Pleuroceras transiens Frentzen, 1937
- Pleuroceras apyrenum Buckman, 1911

== Description ==
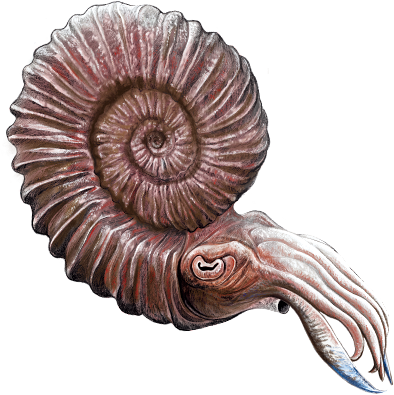
Life restoration

Pleuroceras has a planulate shell with a quadrate whorl section, bearing strong radial ribs ending in ventro-lateral tubercles. The venter is tabulate with a strong serrated keel.

== Distribution ==
Species of this genus were fast-moving nektonic carnivores. Its fossils have been found in Canada and Europe (Bulgaria, France, Germany, Hungary, Italy, Montenegro, Romania, Serbia, Spain and United Kingdom).
