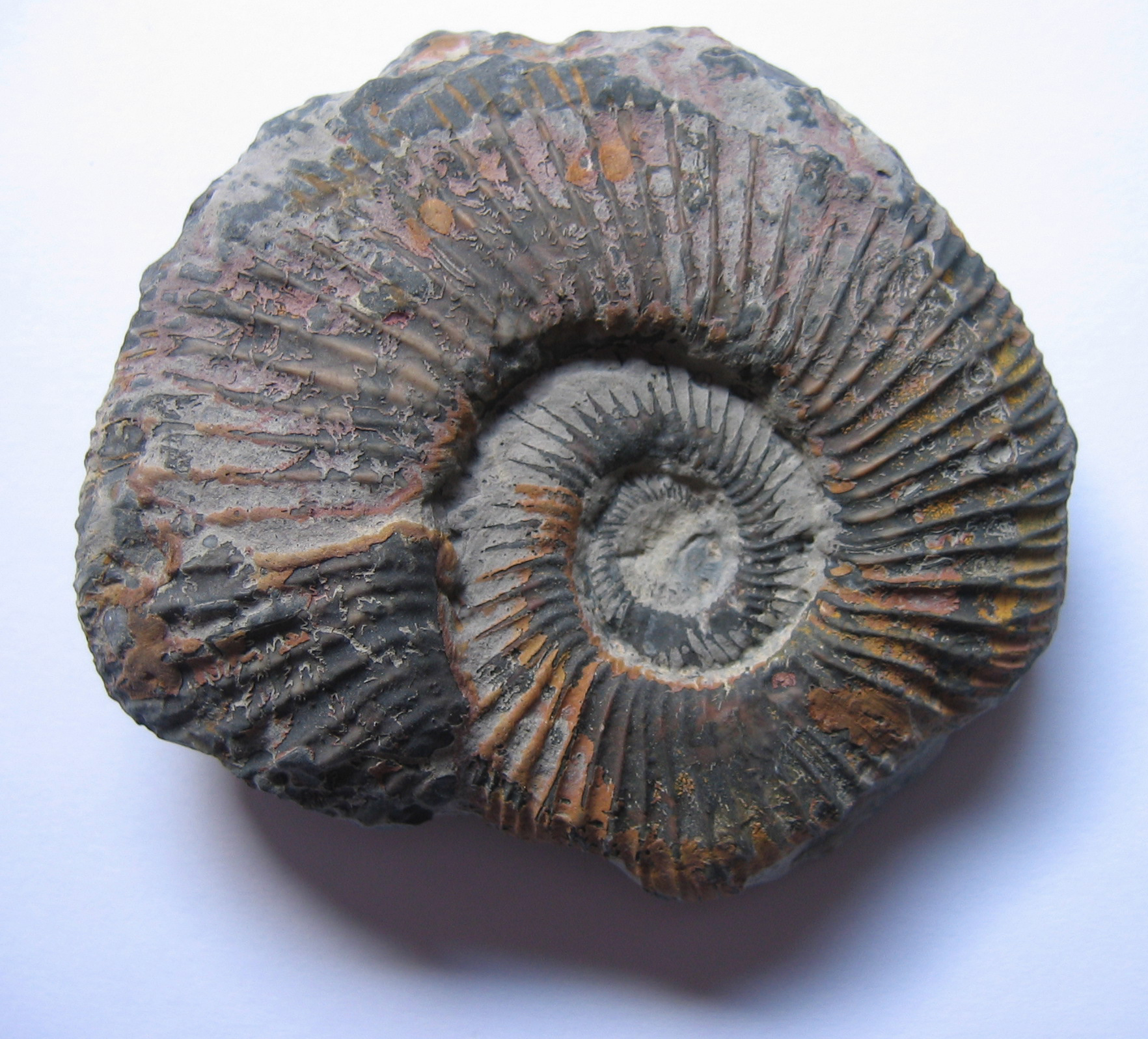

Scientific classification
- Kingdom: Animalia
- Phylum: Mollusca
- Class: Cephalopoda
- Subclass: †Ammonoidea
- Order: †Ammonitida
- Family: †Polymorphitidae
- Genus: †Uptonia

= Uptonia =

Uptonia Temporal range: Pliensbachian

Genus of molluscs (fossil)

Uptonia is an extinct ammonite from the Lower Jurassic that's included in the eoderoceratoidean family Polymorphitidae.

The shell of Uptonia is evolute with rounded simple ribs that form strong chevrons as they cross the venter on the outer rim, and which are free of tubercles. Some grew to be fairly large. The suture is ammonitic, complex, with large lateral lobes

== Distribution ==
Fossils of Uptonia have been found in Argentina, Canada (British Columbia), France, Germany, Greenland, Hungary, the Russian Federation, Spain, Turkey, and the United Kingdom.
