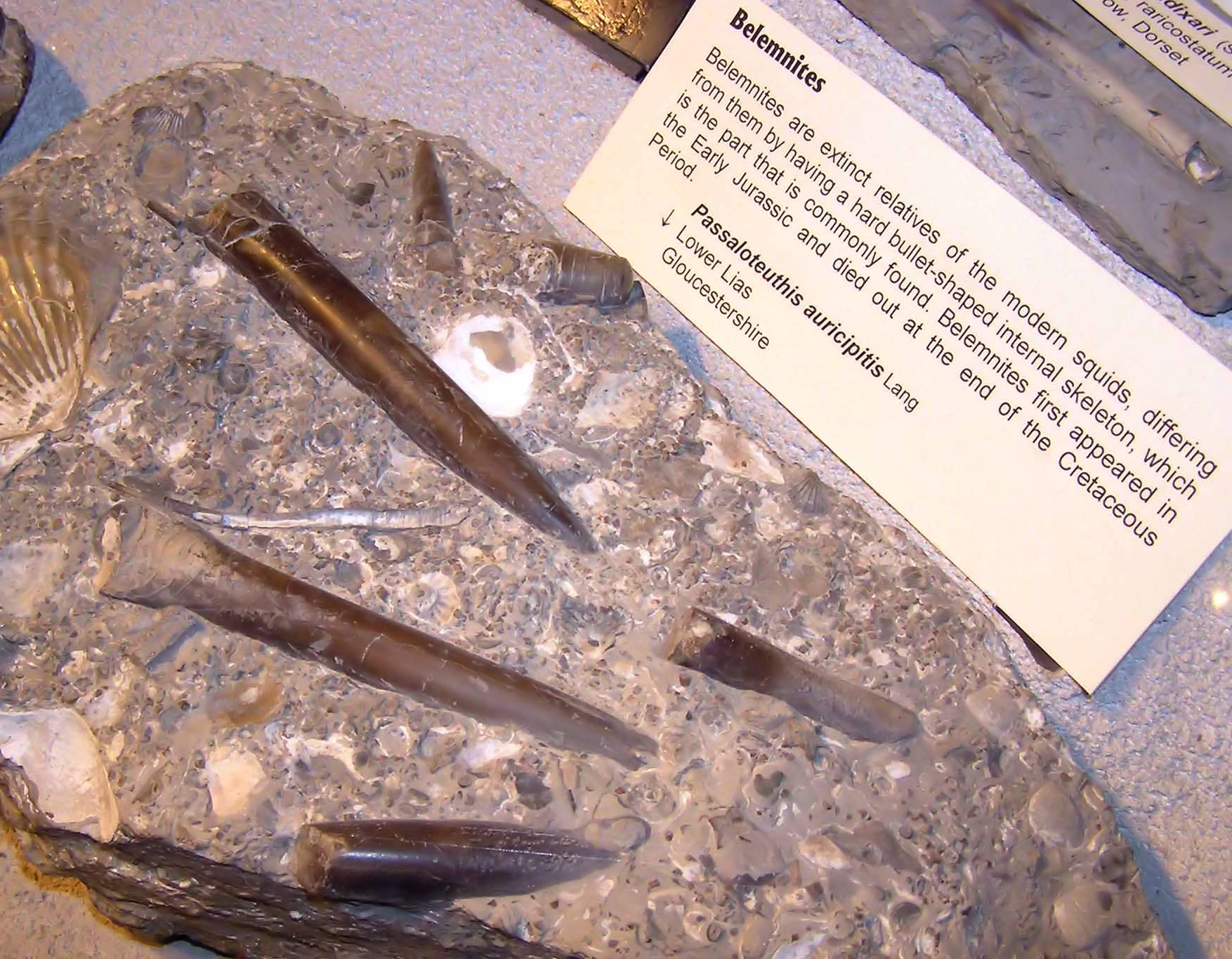
- Passaloteuthis auricipitis guards from the Lower Lias strata, Gloucestershire, England

Scientific classification
- Kingdom: Animalia
- Phylum: Mollusca
- Class: Cephalopoda
- Order: †Belemnitida
- Family: †Passaloteuthididae
- Genus: †Passaloteuthis; Lissajous, 1915

= Passaloteuthis =

Passaloteuthis Temporal range: Pliensbachian-Toarcian183.7–175.6 Ma

Extinct genus of molluscs

Passaloteuthis is a genus of belemnite, an extinct group of cephalopods. Belemnites are typically known for having about 40 micro-hooks on each one of its appendage. However, Passaloteuthis is notable for being associated with a pair of mega-hooks known as onychites. These hooks are tentatively interpreted as male-specific features, though their exact function is still unknown.

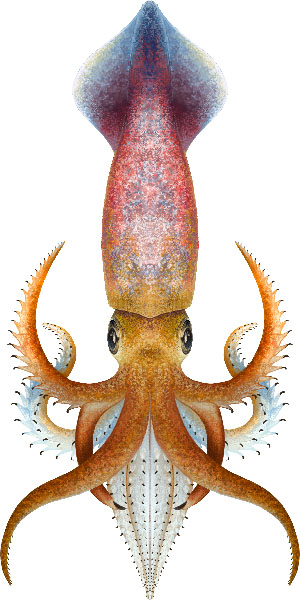
Full-color reconstruction of Passaloteuthis with mega-hooks tentatively attached to the arm crown.

== See also ==
- Belemnite
- List of belemnites
