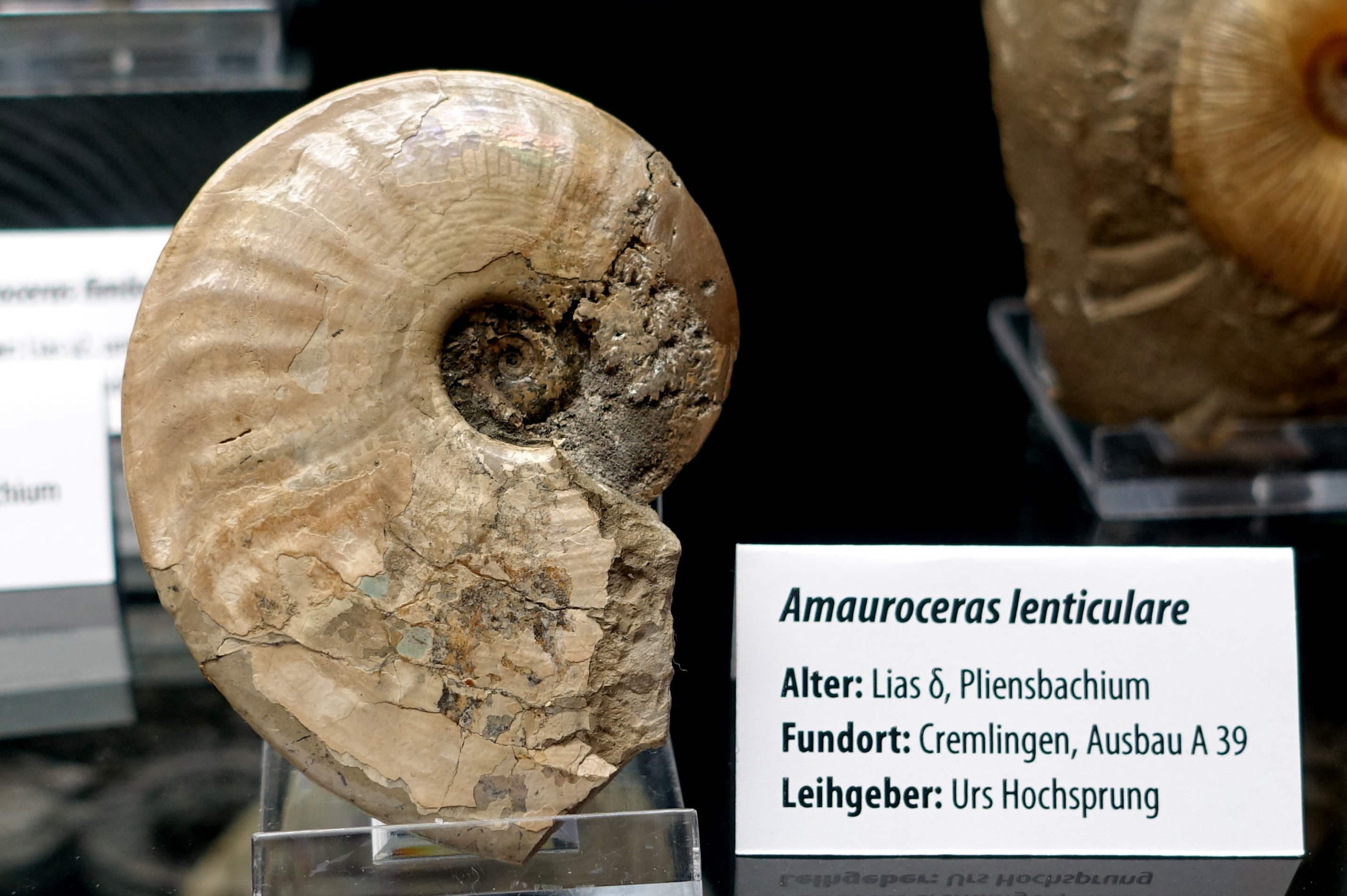

Scientific classification
- Domain: Eukaryota
- Kingdom: Animalia
- Phylum: Mollusca
- Class: Cephalopoda
- Subclass: †Ammonoidea
- Order: †Ammonitida
- Family: †Amaltheidae
- Genus: †Amauroceras

= Amauroceras =

Amauroceras Temporal range: Pliensbachian

Genus of molluscs (fossil)

Amauroceras is an extinct genus of eoderoceratacean ammonites in the family Amaltheidae.
