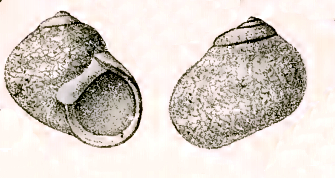

Scientific classification
- Kingdom: Animalia
- Phylum: Mollusca
- Class: Gastropoda
- Subclass: Vetigastropoda
- Order: Trochida
- Superfamily: Trochoidea
- Family: Trochidae
- Genus: Chrysostoma; Swainson, 1840

Type species
- Turbo nicobaricus Gmelin, 1791

= Chrysostoma =

Genus of gastropods

Chrysostoma is a genus of sea snails, marine gastropod mollusks in the family Trochidae, the top snails.

== Description ==
The solid, thick shell has a globose shape. The spire is very short . The aperture is rounded. The parietal wall bears a heavy callus which wholly or almost covers the narrow umbilicus.

== Species ==
Species within the genus Chrysostoma include:

- Chrysostoma paradoxum (Born, 1778)

Species brought into synonymy

- Chrysostoma zeus (Fischer, 1874): synonym of Austrocochlea zeus P. Fischer, 1874
