= Protocardia =

Protocardia Temporal range: Mesozoic

Scientific classification
- Domain: Eukaryota
- Kingdom: Animalia
- Phylum: Mollusca
- Class: Bivalvia
- Order: Cardiida
- Family: Cardiidae
- Genus: †Protocardia

Extinct genus of bivalves

Protocardia is an extinct genus of saltwater clams, marine bivalve mollusks in the subfamily Protocardiinae of the family Cardiidae, the cockles.

The internal anatomy of individuals in this genus is sometimes preserved in phosphate.
