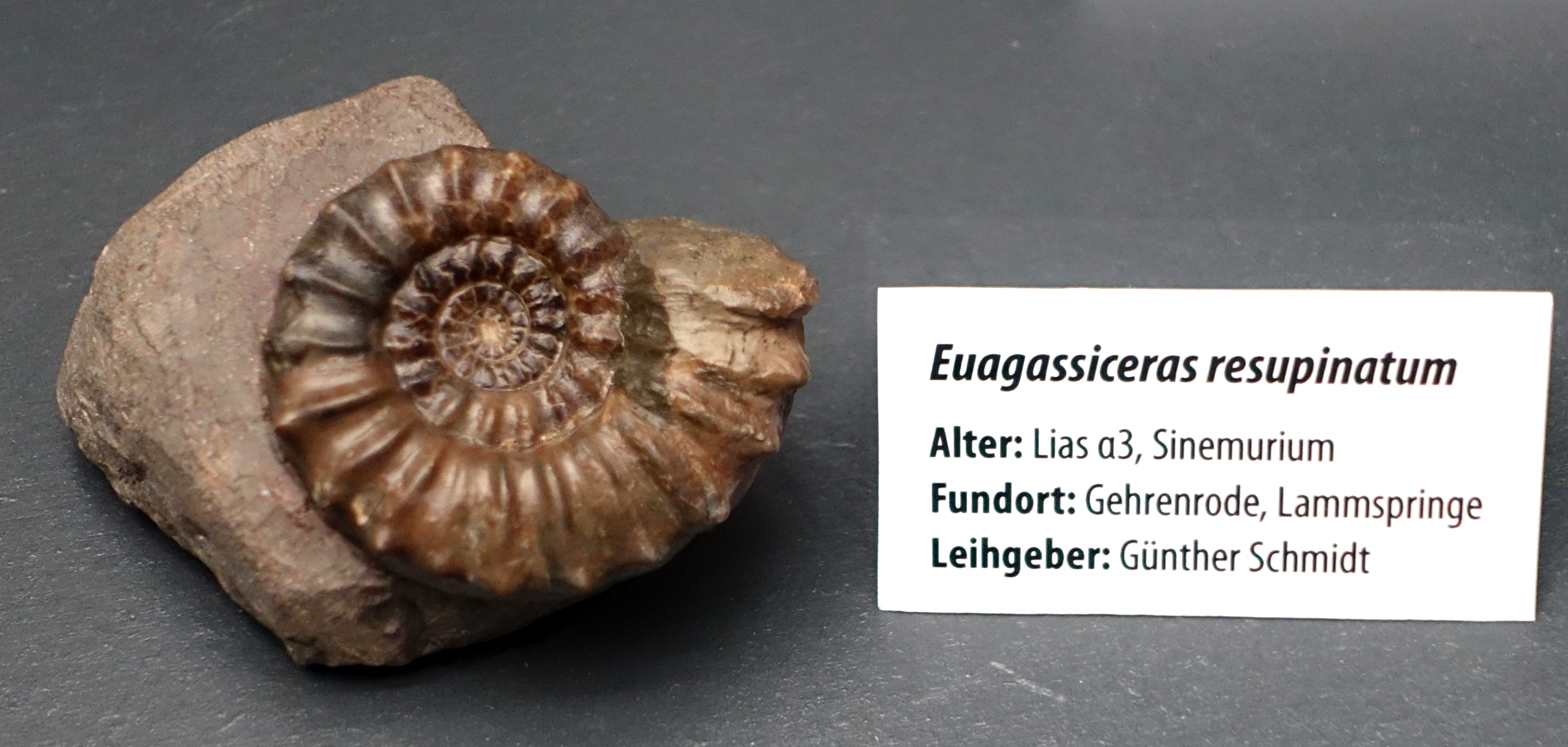
- Euagassiceras resupinatum

Scientific classification
- Kingdom: Animalia
- Phylum: Mollusca
- Class: Cephalopoda
- Subclass: †Ammonoidea
- Order: †Ammonitida
- Family: †Arietitidae
- Subfamily: †Agassiceratinae
- Genus: †Euagassiceras; Spath, 1924

Species
- None cataloged

= Euagassiceras =

Euagassiceras Temporal range: Sinemurian

Genus of molluscs (fossil)

Euagassiceras is an extinct genus of cephalopod belonging to the Ammonite subclass.

== Distribution ==
Jurassic of Argentina, Germany and the United Kingdom.
