= Rollieria =

Rollieria Temporal range: Callovian

Scientific classification
- Kingdom: Animalia
- Phylum: Mollusca
- Class: Cephalopoda
- Subclass: †Ammonoidea
- Order: †Ammonitida
- Family: †Oppeliidae
- Genus: †Rollieria; A. Jeannet, 1951

Species
- Rollieria canaliculata Jeannet 1951; Rollieria freii Jeannet 1951; Rollieria rollieri Jeannet 1951

Ammonite genus

Rollieria is a Jurassic ammonite belonging to the order Ammonitida.

== Distribution ==
France, Germany, Kenya, Switzerland and Tanzania
