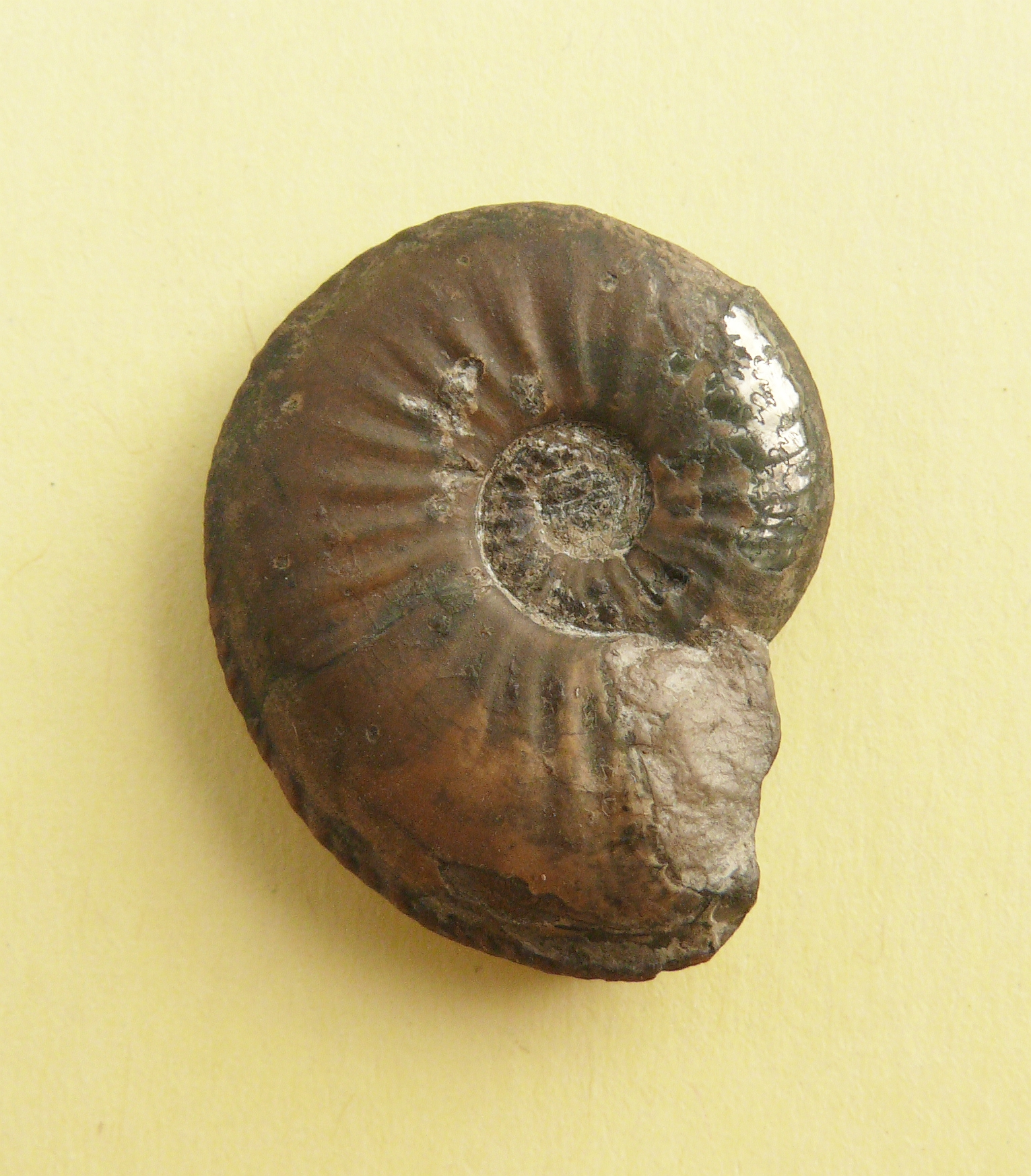

Scientific classification
- Kingdom: Animalia
- Phylum: Mollusca
- Class: Cephalopoda
- Subclass: †Ammonoidea
- Order: †Ammonitida
- Family: †Amaltheidae
- Genus: †Amaltheus de Montfort, 1808

Subgenera
- see text

= Amaltheus =

Amaltheus Temporal range: Pliensbachian

Genus of molluscs (fossil)

Amaltheus is an oxyconic ammonite with a fairly open umbilicus, serrated keel, and slightly sigmoidal ribs from the Lower Jurassic, many of which are strigate. Amaltheus, named by de Montfort, 1808, is indicative of the upper Pliensbachian stage in Europe, north Africa, Caucasus, Siberia, N. Alaska, Canada, Oregon, and possibly Honduras; and is the type for the Amaltheidae and a member of the Eoderoceratoidea.

Two subgenera are recognized. One, A.(Amaltheus) is already described. The other A. (Pseudoamaltheus), sometimes expressed as genus, is a late derivative of (Amaltheus) with an early loss of keel and ribbing and an extreme development of strigation.
