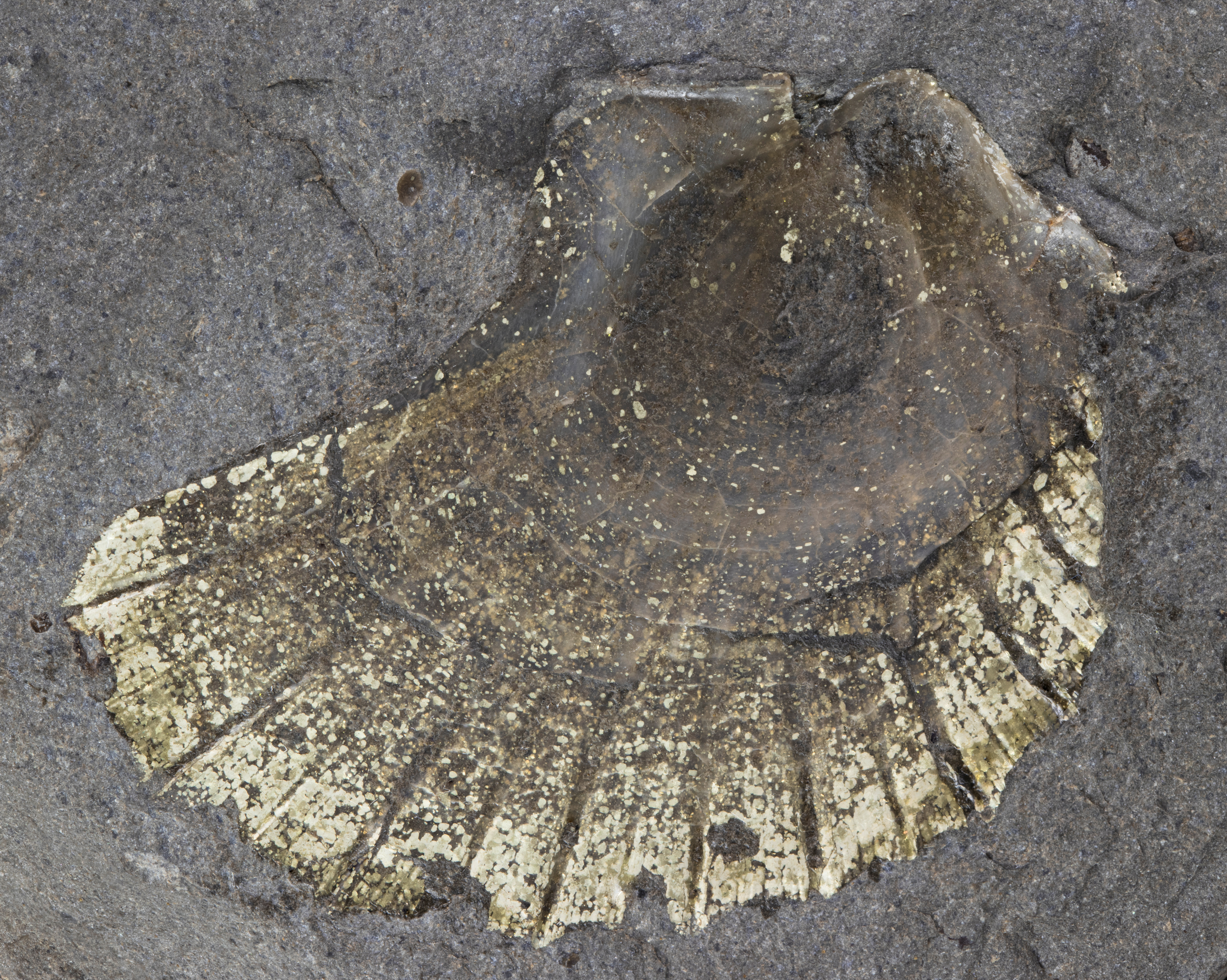
- Oxytoma inequivalve (Sowerby, 1819)

Scientific classification
- Kingdom: Animalia
- Phylum: Mollusca
- Class: Bivalvia
- Order: Pectinida
- Family: †Oxytomidae
- Genus: †Oxytoma; Meek, 1864

Synonyms
- Pteria

= Oxytoma =

Oxytoma Temporal range: Late Permian-Early Paleocene, 259–62 Ma

Extinct genus of bivalves

Oxytoma is an extinct genus of bivalve molluscs that lived from the Late Permian to the early Paleocene, with a worldwide distribution except Australia. The genus was named in 1864 by Fielding Bradford Meek.

The species Oxytoma cygnipes is notable. Formerly known as Avicula cygnipes, it is the stratigraphic marker of the economically important Avicula Seam (Upper Pliensbachian) in the Cleveland Ironstone Formation of North Yorkshire.
