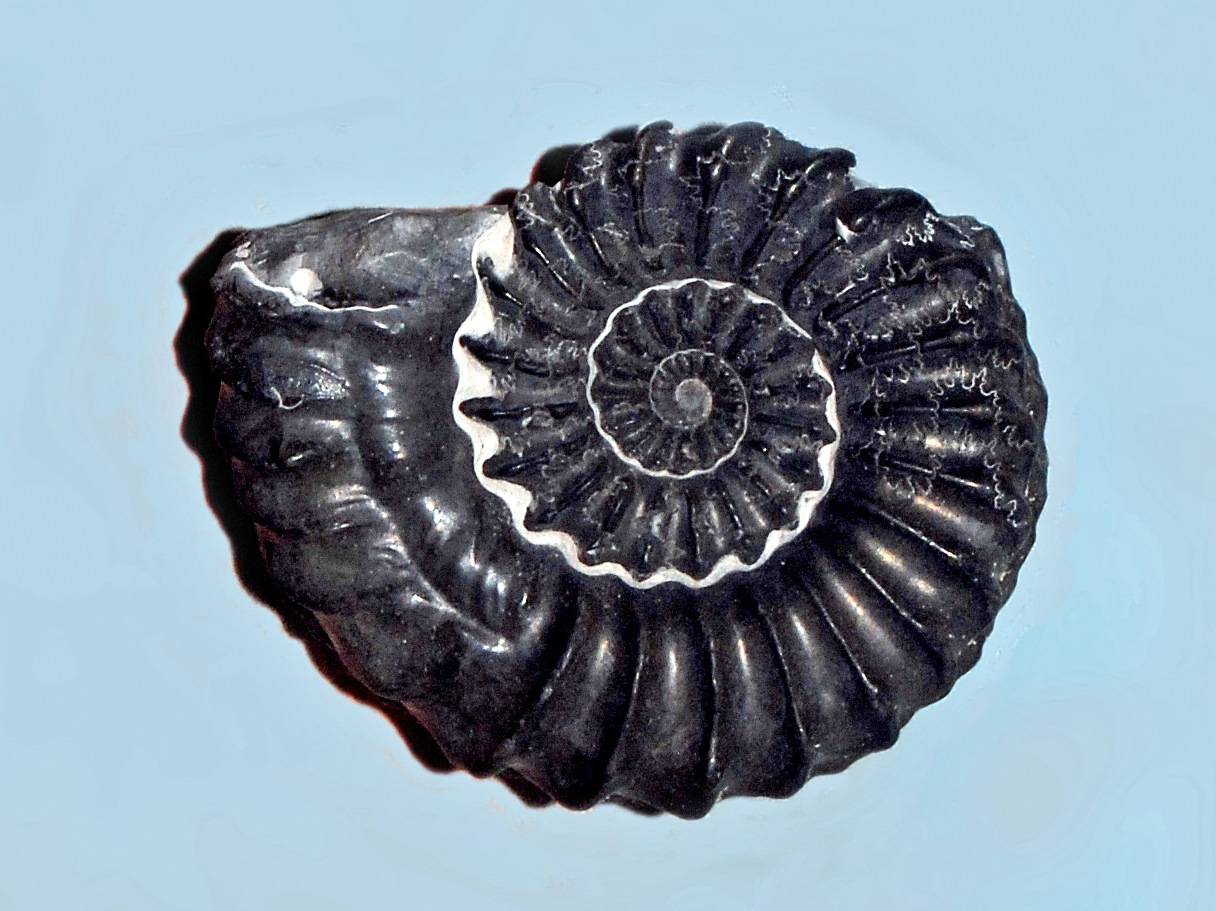
- Pleuroceras sp. from Germany

Scientific classification
- Kingdom: Animalia
- Phylum: Mollusca
- Class: Cephalopoda
- Subclass: †Ammonoidea
- Order: †Ammonitida
- Superfamily: †Eoderoceratoidea
- Family: †Amaltheidae; Hyatt, 1867

Genera
- Amaltheus de Montfort, 1808; Amauroceras; Pleuroceras Hyatt, 1868

= Amaltheidae =

Amaltheidae Temporal range: Late Pliensbachian, 187–183 Ma

Extinct family of molluscs

Amaltheidae is a family of eoderoceratoidean ammonitids from the Lower Jurassic consisting of genera characterised by stigated discoidal oxycones—narrow involute shells with narrowly rounded to angular venters that bear a series of grooves, or ridges, along broad flanks, which according to the Treatise L, 1957, evolved into strongly ribbed planulates (discoidal evolute shells) with quadrate whorls, typically with crenulated keels; involving all together four genera.

Donovan in Donovan et al. (1981) retains the Amaltheidae in the sense of Arkell, et al. 1957, as shown in the Treatise but synonymizes Pseudoamaltheus with Amaltheus, (a subgenus in the Treatise), reducing the number of valid genera to three. These are Amaltheus, Amauroceras, and Pleuroceras.

Amaltheus is oxyconic, keeled, strigated, and ribbed on the outer flanks.

Amauroceras is smooth, compressed, without ribs or stigation, and the keel is reduced.

Pleuroceras has a planulate shell with a quadrate whorl section, bearing strong radial ribs ending in ventro-lateral tubercles. The venter is tabulate with a strong serrated keel.

The Amaltheidae are derived from the Liparoceratidae and have a principally boreal distribution.

Approximate timeline of Amaltheidae genera and subgenera.
