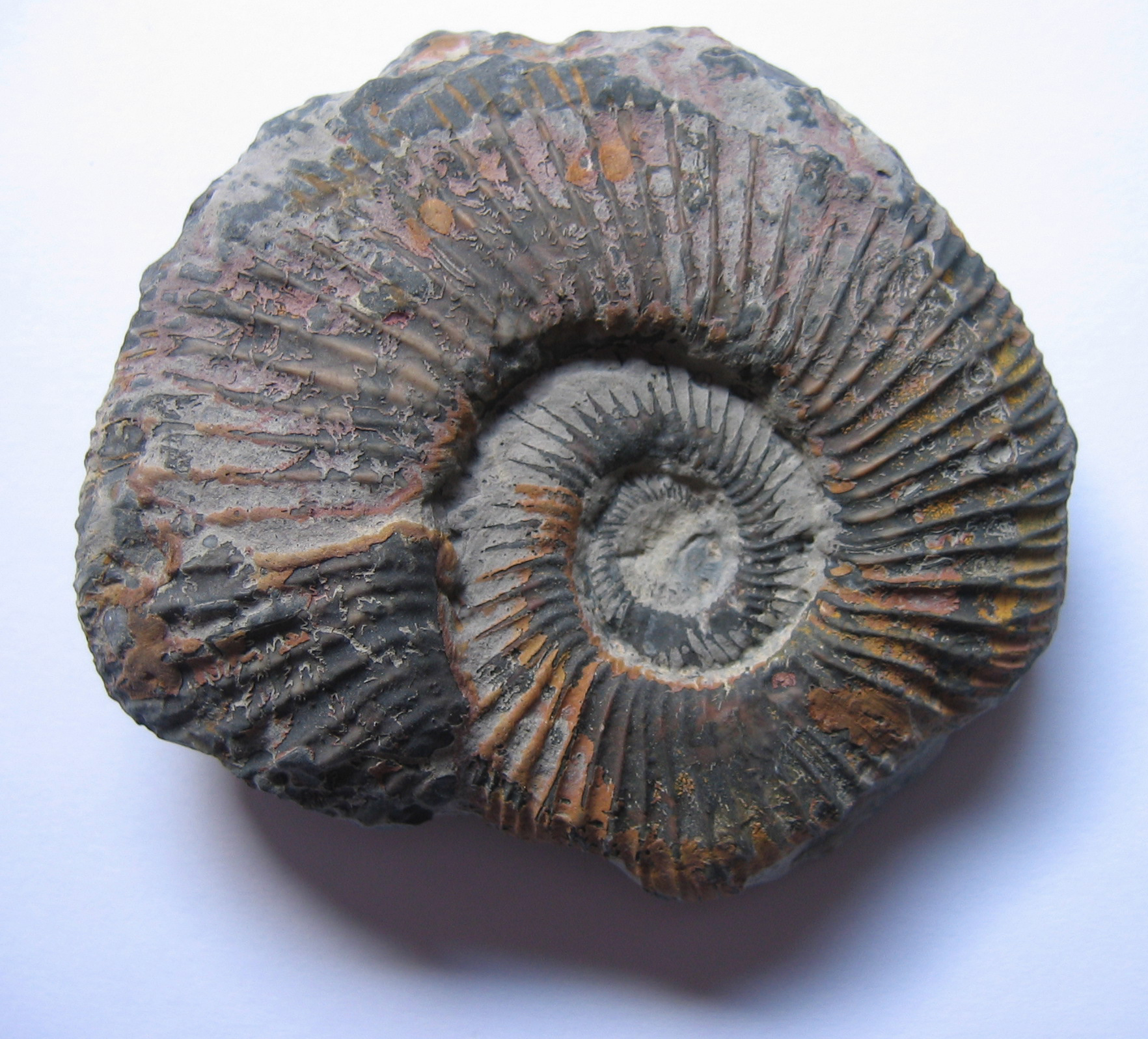

Scientific classification
- Kingdom: Animalia
- Phylum: Mollusca
- Class: Cephalopoda
- Subclass: †Ammonoidea
- Order: †Ammonitida
- Superfamily: †Eoderoceratoidea
- Family: †Polymorphitidae; Haug, 1887

= Polymorphitidae =

Polymorphitidae Temporal range: early Jurassic

Extinct family of molluscs

Polymorphitidae is a family of Early Jurassic ammonoid cephalopods that contribute to the Eoderoceratoidea. Two subfamilies, the Polymorphtinae and Tropidoceratinae, are included.

Polymorphitid ammonites produced typically evolute shells, which are more compressed than in most members of the superfamily. Many possess ventral chevrons and/or a fastigate venter resembling a gable roof, which in some develops into a true keel on the outer whorls.

The Polymorphtinae is the larger and more diverse subfamily of the two. their shells have venters (outer rims) that may be smooth or ribbed, or have a median row of beading or serrations. The Tropidoceratinae, referred to as the Acanthopleuroceratinae in the Treatise L 1957, instead have a venter with a keel.
