= Hasle Formation =

Geologic formation on the island on Bornholm, Denmark

- Stratigraphic range: Lower to Middle Pliensbachian; ~189–184 Ma Jamesoni–Margaritatus Chronozone
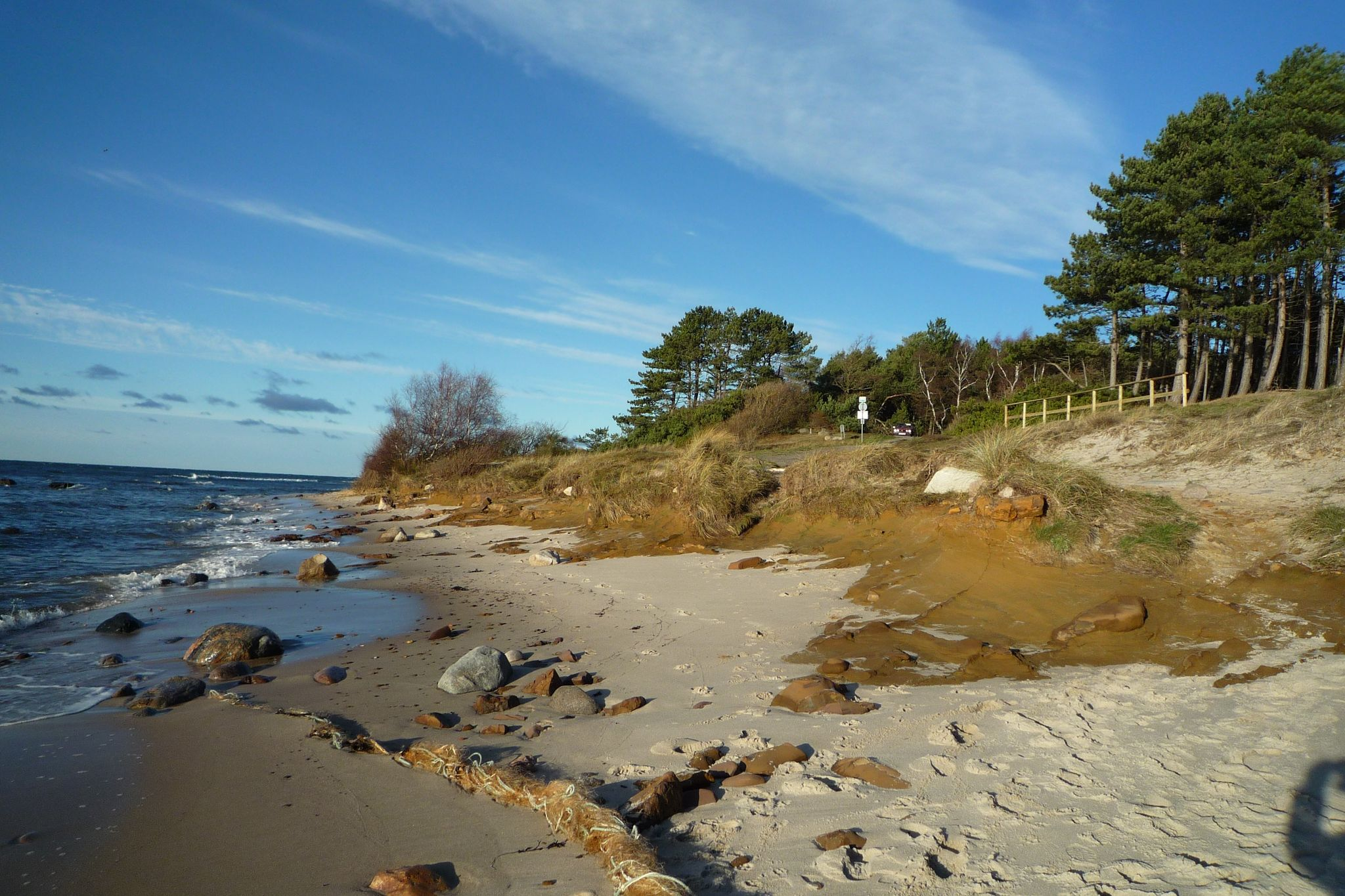
- Outcrop (Yellow layers)
- Unit of: Bornholm Group
- Underlies: Sorthat Formation
- Overlies: Rønne Formation
- Thickness: 80–140 m (260–460 ft)

Lithology
- Primary: Siltstone, sandstone

Location
- Coordinates: 55.2°N 14.7°E
- Approximate paleocoordinates: 45.0°N 18.5°E
- Region: Bornholm
- Country: Denmark

Type section
- Named for: Hasle, Bornholm
- Named by: Gry
- Year defined: 1969
- Hasle Formation (Denmark)

The Hasle Formation is a geologic formation on the island on Bornholm, Denmark. It is of early to late Pliensbachian age. Vertebrate fossils have been uncovered from this formation. The type section of the formation is found at the south of the costal Hasle Town, and it is composed by rusty yellow to brownish siltstones and very fine-grained sandstones. The southernmost arch, Hvjdoddebuen, is not as fossil-bearing as the type unit in Hasle. The formation can be separated in two different petrographic types: type 1 sandstones are friable with layers and lenses of concretionary siderite and type 2 well-cemented sandstones. Both types where deposited in a relatively high-energy marine environment with a diagenetic pattern that demonstrates a close relation to various phases of subsidence and uplift in the tectonically unstable Fennoscandian Border Zone. Most of its deposition happened on a storm-dominated shoreface, with the exposed parts deposited in an open marine shelf within 1–2 km distance from the fault-controlled coastlines. However, recent works have recovered terrestrial fauna from it, including a footprint, suggesting easterly winds and low tide could have exposed the inner parts of the upper shoreface, and create long-lasting Floodplain-type environments. Field works since 1984 have shown a mostly hummocky cross-stratified deposition, with great complexity of the sediments that suggests very complicated and variable flow conditions, with Megaripples derived from storm events. Storms were frequent and the coastline faced a wide epeiric sea with a fetch towards the west of possibly 1000 kilometers. The Jamesoni–Ibex Chronozone in the Central European Basin represents a clear sea Transgression, due to the appearance of ammonites from Thuringia and southern Lower Saxony, showing a full marine ingression towards the west. This rise in the sea level is also measured in the north, as is proven by the presence of Uptonia jamesoni in Kurremölla (Röddinge Formation, Skåne) and Beaniceras centaurus plus Phricodoceras taylori on the Hasle Formation. The whole Hasle Sandstones are a result of this rise in the sea level, where the marine sediments cover the deltaic layers of the Rønne Formation. The rise in the sea level is observed on palynology, as on the Hasle Formation Nannoceratopsis senex (Dinoflajellate) and Mendicodinium reticulaturn (Algae Acritarch) appear, indicating a transition from paralic and restricted marine to fully marine.

== Fossil content ==
=== Annelida ===
Genus	Species	Location	Material	Notes	Images
Pentaditrupa	P. quinquesulcata	Stampeå stream	Two tubes	A sessile, marine annelid tube worm of the family Serpulidae	
Serpula?	S.? alicecooperi	Stampeå stream	One well-preserved tube and several fragmentary tubes	A sessile, marine annelid tube worm of the family Serpulidae.	Head of a modern Serpula vermicularis

=== Brachiopoda ===
Genus	Species	Location	Material	Notes	Images
Rhynchonella	R. jurensis; R. variabilis	Stampeå stream; South of Hasle	Shells	A saltwater Brachiopodan, member of Rhynchonellata inside Rhynchonellida. Found associated with Plicatula on long-term well-oxygenated conditions within the substrate and bottom waters.	
Waldheimia	W. sp.	Stampeå stream	Shells	A saltwater lamp shell Brachiopodan, member of Terebratulidae inside Terebratulida. The specimens are rather incomplete. The genus is a possible junior synonym of Terebratula.	

=== Bivalvia ===
Genus	Species	Location	Material	Notes	Images
Astarte	A. obsoleta; A. sp.	Stampeå stream; South of Hasle	Shells	A saltwater clam, type member of the family Astartidae inside Carditida. It is found on small, smooth clam associations, with the exception of one does section, with less well-preserved stone cores and imprints.	
Avicula	A. inaequivalvis; A. sp.	Stampeå stream; South of Hasle	Shells	A saltwater pearl oyster, member of the family Pteriidae inside Ostreida. Some specimens are big and found associated with burrow-filled surfaces. This well-known species occurs extremely frequently; copies occur at all ages, as well as right-handers left shells have been found.	
Cardinia	C. multicostatum; C. crassiuscula; C. infera	Stampeå stream; South of Hasle; Hvideoddebuen; Nebbeodde	Shells	A saltwater clam, type member of the family Cardiidae inside Carditida. Is a frequently occurring clam.	
Cucullaea	C. sp.	South of Hasle	Shells	A saltwater clam, type member of the family Cucullaeidae inside Arcida.	
Cyprina	C. cardioides	Stampeå stream; Hvideoddebuen; Nebbeodde	Shells	A saltwater clam, member of the family Arcticidae inside Venerida. Is a frequently occurring clam.	
Cypricardia	C. cf.laevigata; C. cf.tetragona	South of Hasle	Shells	A saltwater clam, member of the family Trapezidae inside Venerida.	
Dendostrea	D. sandvichensis	Stampeå stream	Shells	A saltwater oyster, member of the family Ostreinae inside Ostreida. Identified originally as Ostrea semiplicata	
Gervilleia	G. sjögreni; G. cf. hagenovii; G. sp.	Stampeå stream; South of Hasle	Shells	A saltwater oyster, member of the family Bakevelliidae inside Ostreida. Found on a series of incomplete stone cores filled with specimens, that by size and form can be possibly attributable to Gervilleia aerosa.	
Hinnites	H. tumidus	Stampeå stream	Shells	A saltwater scallop, member of the family Pectinidae inside Pectinida. A pair of incomplete specimens of a Hinnites are known and probably match with the species Hinnites tumidus; however, the state of preservation is bad, with the assignment rather uncertain.	
Lima	L. succincta	Stampeå stream	Shells	A saltwater file clam, type member of the family Limidae inside Pectinida.	
Limea	L. acuticosfa	Stampeå stream	Shells	A saltwater file clam, member of the family Limidae inside Pectinida. Mostly know due to a single young individual.	
Luciniola	L. pumila	Stampeå stream	Shells	A saltwater clam, type member of the family Lucinidae inside Lucinida.	
Modiolus	M. scalprum; M. sp.	South of Hasle	Shells	A saltwater mussel, type member of the family Mytilidae inside Mytilida.	
Myoconcha	M. stampensis; M. jespersenii	Stampeå stream	Shells	A saltwater clam, member of the family Kalenteridae inside Cardiida. One of the most frequent and characteristic fossils in the formation	
Mytilus	M. sp.	South of Hasle	Shells	A saltwater mussel, type member of the family Mytilidae inside Mytilida.	
Nucula	N. distinguenda; N. (Leda?) dr. omaliusi?; N. pinguis	Stampeå stream	Shells	A saltwater nut clam, type member of the family Nuculidae inside Nuculida. Two copies of a Nucula (leda?) so closely in accordance with Moberg's depictions and description of occurring at Kurremolla.	
Nuculana	N. bornholmiensis; N. subovalis; N. complanata	Stampeå stream	Shells	A saltwater pointed nut clam, type member of the family Nuculanidae inside Nuculida. Nuculana bornholmiensis is a very common species only found locally.	
Palaeoneilo	P. bornholmiensis; P. sp.	Stampeå stream; South of Hasle	Shells	A saltwater pointed nut clam, type member of the family Nuculanidae inside Nuculida.	
Parallelodon	P. cypriniformis; P. pullus	Stampeå stream; South of Hasle	Shells	A saltwater clam, type member of the family Parallelodontidae inside Arcida. This species occurs frequently and varies a lot	
Pecten	P. priscus; P. aequivalvis	Stampeå stream; South of Hasle; Hvideoddebuen; Nebbeodde	Shells	A saltwater scallop, type member of the family Pectinidae inside Pectinida. This species has been exceedingly frequent, and numerous fragments are available.	
Perna	P. sp.	South of Hasle	Shells	A saltwater mussel, member of the family Mytilidae inside Mytilida.	
Pleuromya	P. forchhammeri; P. dunkeri	Stampeå stream; South of Hasle; Hvideoddebuen; Nebbeodde	Shells	A saltwater clam, type member of the family Pleuromyidae inside Pholadida. Three specimens of this genus have been found.	
Plicatula	P. spinosa	Stampeå stream	Shells	A saltwater scallop, type member of the family Plicatulidae inside Pectinida. Two poorly preserved specimens have been found.	
Spondylus	S. sp.	South of Hasle	Shells	A saltwater scallop, member of the family Pectinoidae inside Pectinida.	
Tancredia	T. lineata; T. elegans; T. tenera; T. johnstrupi	Stampeå stream; South of Hasle	Shells	A saltwater clam, type member of the family Tancrediidae inside Carditida. Tancredia lineata Is based on six shell cores, of which one complete, the others a little defective at the front end.	
Tellina	T. sp.	South of Hasle	Shells	A saltwater tellin clam, member of the family Tellinidae inside Cardiida.	

=== Scaphopoda ===
Genus	Species	Location	Material	Notes	Images
Laevidentalium	L. etalense; L. elongatum; L. sp.	Stampeå stream; South of Hasle	Shells	A saltwater tusk shell (Scaphopoda), member of the family Dentaliidae inside Dentaliida	

=== Gastropoda ===
Genus	Species	Location	Material	Notes	Images
Actaeonina	A. nathorsti	Stampeå stream; South of Hasle	Shells	A saltwater snail, type member of the family Acteoninidae inside Prosobranchia. Of this small species there are quite a few specimens, both stone cores and imprints that perfectly allow identifying the species.	
Amberlya	A. sp.	South of Hasle	Shells	A saltwater snail, type member of the family Spirostylidae inside Murchisoniina.	
Chemnitzia	C.? undulata; C. craticia; C. citharella; C. blainvillei	Stampeå stream	Shells	A saltwater snail, member of the family Pyramidellidae inside Pyramidelloidea. Two specimens of a Turritella-like gastropod found locally have been refer to the genus. Chemnitzia citharella includes ten specimens, the largest of the genus found locally. However, most of the specimens are shell cores.	
Eucyclus	E. sp.	Stampeå stream	Shells	A saltwater snail, type member of the family Eucyclidae inside Seguenzioidea. The material available is rather poor.	
Margarites	M. solarium	Stampeå stream	Shells	A saltwater snail, member of the family Turbinidae inside Turbinoidea. Occurs frequently, especially on marine ingression surfaces.	
Natica	N. sp.	South of Hasle	Shells	A saltwater moon snail, type member of the family Naticidae inside Naticoidea.	
Neritina	N. cf.liasina	South of Hasle	Shells	A saltwater snail, type member of the family Neritidae inside Neritoidea.	
Pleurotomaria	P. expansa; P. sp.	Stampeå stream; South of Hasle	Shells	A saltwater snail, type member of the family Pleurotomariidae inside Pleurotomarioidea.	
Trochus	T. laevis; T. subsulcatus	Stampeå stream	Shells	A saltwater top snail, type member of the family Trochidae inside Trochoidea. Rare compared with other species found locally.	

=== Belemnites ===
Genus	Species	Location	Material	Notes	Images
Nannobelus	N. acutus	Stampeå stream; South of Hasle	Phragmocones	A belemnite, incertae sedis member of the family Belemnitida. Frequently shows the embryonic chamber preserved as a bladder, slightly bent forward-towards the ventral side.	
Subhastites	S. paxillosus; S. sp.	Stampeå stream	Phragmocones	A belemnite, member of the family Hastitidae inside Belemnitida.	

=== Ammonites ===
Genus	Species	Location	Material	Notes	Images
Acanthopleuroceras?	A.? sp. indet.	Rønne Lervarefabrik; Stampeå stream; South of Hasle; Hvideoddebuen; Nebbeodde	Shells	A possible ammonite of the family Polymorphitidae inside Ammonitida.	
Aegoceras	A. armatum	Rønne Lervarefabrik; Stampeå stream; South of Hasle; Hvideoddebuen; Nebbeodde	Shells	An ammonite of the family Liparoceratidae inside Ammonitida. Later renamed Beaniceras centaurus, senior synonym of Aegoceras centaurus	
Aegoceras	A. centaurus	Rønne Lervarefabrik; Stampeå stream; South of Hasle; Hvideoddebuen; Nebbeodde	Shells	An ammonite of the family Liparoceratidae inside Ammonitida. Later renamed Beaniceras centaurus, senior synonym of Aegoceras centaurus	
Aegoceras	A. capraius	Rønne Lervarefabrik; Stampeå stream; South of Hasle; Hvideoddebuen; Nebbeodde	Shells	An ammonite of the family Liparoceratidae inside Ammonitida. Later renamed Beaniceras centaurus, senior synonym of Aegoceras centaurus	
Aegoceras	A. mangenesti	Rønne Lervarefabrik; Stampeå stream; South of Hasle; Hvideoddebuen; Nebbeodde	Shells	An ammonite of the family Liparoceratidae inside Ammonitida. Later renamed Beaniceras centaurus, senior synonym of Aegoceras centaurus	
Aegoceras	A. pettos	Rønne Lervarefabrik; Stampeå stream; South of Hasle; Hvideoddebuen; Nebbeodde	Shells	Junior synonym of Coeloceras pettos, possible synonym of Coeloceras grenouillouxi	
Apoderoceras	A. aculeatum	Rønne Lervarefabrik; Stampeå stream; South of Hasle; Hvideoddebuen; Nebbeodde	Shells	An ammonite of the family Polymorphitidae inside Ammonitida.	
Arnioceras	A. falcaries	Rønne Lervarefabrik; Stampeå stream; South of Hasle; Hvideoddebuen; Nebbeodde	Shells	An ammonite of the family Arietitidae inside Ammonitida.	
Beaniceras	B. centaurus	Rønne Lervarefabrik; Stampeå stream; South of Hasle; Hvideoddebuen; Nebbeodde	Shells	An ammonite of the family Liparoceratidae inside Ammonitida. Senior synonym of Aegoceras centaurus	
Coeloceras	C. pettos	Rønne Lervarefabrik; Stampeå stream; South of Hasle; Hvideoddebuen; Nebbeodde	Shells	An ammonite of the family Coeloceratidae inside Psilocerataceae. Senior synonym of Aegoceras pettos. Possible junior synonym of Coeloceras grenouillouxi	
Coeloceras	C. grenouillouxi	Rønne Lervarefabrik; Stampeå stream; South of Hasle; Hvideoddebuen; Nebbeodde	Shells	Possible senior synonym of Coeloceras pettos	
Paramicroderoceras	P. fila	Rønne Lervarefabrik; Stampeå stream; South of Hasle; Hvideoddebuen; Nebbeodde	Shells	An ammonite of the family Juraphyllitidae inside Phylloceratina.	
Paramicroderoceras	P.? sp indet	Rønne Lervarefabrik; Stampeå stream; South of Hasle; Hvideoddebuen; Nebbeodde	Shells	An ammonite of the family Juraphyllitidae inside Phylloceratina.	
Phylloceras	P. loscombii	Rønne Lervarefabrik; Stampeå stream; South of Hasle; Hvideoddebuen; Nebbeodde	Shells	An ammonite of the family Juraphyllitidae inside Phylloceratina.	
Phricodoceras	P. taylori	Rønne Lervarefabrik; Stampeå stream; South of Hasle; Hvideoddebuen; Nebbeodde	Shells	An ammonite of the family Phricodoceratidae inside Psilocerataceae.	
Platypleuroceras	P. brevispina	Rønne Lervarefabrik; Stampeå stream; South of Hasle; Hvideoddebuen; Nebbeodde	Shells	An ammonite of the family Polymorphitidae inside Ammonitida.	
Platypleuroceras	P. submulticum	Rønne Lervarefabrik; Stampeå stream; South of Hasle; Hvideoddebuen; Nebbeodde	Shells	An ammonite of the family Polymorphitidae inside Ammonitida.	
Platypleuroceras	P. caprarium	Rønne Lervarefabrik; Stampeå stream; South of Hasle; Hvideoddebuen; Nebbeodde	Shells	An ammonite of the family Polymorphitidae inside Ammonitida.	
Platypleuroceras	P. spp. indet	Rønne Lervarefabrik; Stampeå stream; South of Hasle; Hvideoddebuen; Nebbeodde	Shells	An ammonite of the family Polymorphitidae inside Ammonitida.	
Radstockiceras	R. hechingense	Rønne Lervarefabrik; Stampeå stream; South of Hasle; Hvideoddebuen; Nebbeodde	Shells	An ammonite of the family Oxynoticeratidae inside Psilocerataceae.	
Tragophylloceras	T. numismale	Rønne Lervarefabrik; Stampeå stream; South of Hasle; Hvideoddebuen; Nebbeodde	Shells	An ammonite of the family Juraphyllitidae inside Phylloceratina.	
Tragophylloceras	T. sp	Rønne Lervarefabrik; Stampeå stream; South of Hasle; Hvideoddebuen; Nebbeodde	Shells	An ammonite of the family Juraphyllitidae inside Phylloceratina.	
Uptonia	U. lata	Rønne Lervarefabrik; Stampeå stream; South of Hasle; Hvideoddebuen; Nebbeodde	Shells	An ammonite of the family Polymorphitidae inside Ammonitida.	
Uptonia	U. sp indet	Rønne Lervarefabrik; Stampeå stream; South of Hasle; Hvideoddebuen; Nebbeodde	Shells	An ammonite of the family Polymorphitidae inside Ammonitida.	

=== Crustacea ===
Genus	Species	Location	Material	Notes	Images
Goniodromites?	G.? liasicus	Stampeå stream	2 partially preserved specimens	A possible early Brachyuran, then recovered as not related with Goniodromites, and suggested to be from younger strata, what was contested latter.	

=== Chondrichthyes ===
Unidentified fin spines are known from this formation.

Genus	Species	Location	Material	Notes	Images
Acrodus	A. minimus	Stampeå stream	Large number of teeth	A marine shark, member of the family Acrodontidae inside Hybodontiformes.	
Agaleus	A. dorsetensis	Hasle Harbour	Four teeth	A marine shark, type member of the family Agaleidae inside Euselachii. This genus may have been a suction feeder as its anterior teeth are similar to those of extant nurse sharks.	
Hybodontidae indet.	Indeterminate	Hasle Harbour	One incomplete spine	A marine shark, incertae sedis inside Hybodontiformes.	
Hybodus	H. reticulatus	Hasle Harbour	21 incomplete crowns	A marine shark, type member of the family Hybodontidae inside Hybodontiformes.	
Hybodus	H. delabechei	Hasle Harbour	Three complete crowns	A marine shark, type member of the family Hybodontidae inside Hybodontiformes. Its teeth suggest that it may have been feeding on shelly invertebrates.	
Lissodus	L. hasleensis	Hasle Harbour	Four complete teeth	A marine/brackish shark, member of the family Lonchidiidae inside Hybodontiformes.	
Myriacanthidae indet.	Indeterminate	Hasle Harbour	Tooth plates	Indeterminate tooth plates of marine chimaeras.	
Myriacanthus	M. paradoxus	Cliff section 100 m south of Hasle	Tooth plates	A marine chimaera.	
Myriacanthus	M. sp.	Hasle Harbour	Isolated tooth plate	A marine chimaera, type member of the family Myriacanthidae inside Chimaeriformes.	
Oblidens	O. bornholmensis	Cliff section 100 m south of Hasle	Multiple tooth plates.	A marine chimaera, member of the family Myriacanthidae inside Chimaeriformes.	
Paraorthacodus	P. sp	Hasle Harbour	Two incomplete teeth	A marine shark, member of the family Palaeospinacidae inside Synechodontiformes.	
Synechodus	S. occultidens	Hasle Harbour	Four incomplete teeth	A marine shark, type member of the family Palaeospinacidae inside Synechodontiformes.	

=== Actinopteri ===
Genus	Species	Stratigraphic position	Material	Notes	Images
Archaeotolithus	A. bornholmiensis; A. sp.	Stampeå stream	Otoliths	Interpreted as sagittal otoliths of a Palaeonisciformes Indet. Fish Otoliths, originally assigned to the extant family Sciaenidae, then from members of Palaeoniscidae and some other research suggest affinities with Pholidophoriformes.	
Saurichthys?	S. acuminata?; S. longidens?	Stampeå stream	Teeth	A marine/brackish Osteichthyes, representative of the family Saurichthyidae inside Chondrostei. The referral to the genus must be taken with caution, as currently it´s geological range is limited to the Triassic.	Saurichthys model

=== Sauropterygia ===
Genus	Species	Location	Material	Notes	Images
Plesiosauria indet.	Indeterminate	Hasle Harbour	MGUH DK41, complete right ischium	Resembles Microcleidus	Microcleidus
Plesiosauria indet.	Indeterminate	Hasle Harbour	MGUH DK416, complete isolated humerus	Incertae sedis	
Plesiosauria indet.	Indeterminate	Hasle Harbour	MGUH DKV-2002-65, complete ulna/fibula	Incertae sedis	
Plesiosauria indet.	Indeterminate	Hasle Harbour	MGUH 1.2002, fragment of jaw with eleven alveoli	Incertae sedis	
Plesiosauria indet.	Indeterminate	Hasle Harbour	MGUH DKV-2003-1720, complete sacral vertebra	Incertae sedis	
Plesiosauria indet.	Indeterminate	Hasle Harbour	MUGH DKV-2002-74, small sacral rib	Incertae Sedis	
Plesiosauria indet.	Indeterminate	Hasle Harbour	MGUH DKV- 2002-75, single fragment of rib	Incertae sedis	
Plesiosauria indet.	Indeterminate	Hasle Klint	NHMD 625503 a partial vertebra with its neural spine missing	It can also be a Dinosaur or an Ichthyosaur	
Plesiosauria indet.	Indeterminate	Hasle Klint	NHMD 625435 well-preserved neural arch and spine	Incertae sedis	
Plesiosauria indet.	Indeterminate	Hasle Klint	NHMD 625357-1 disarticulated, three-dimensionally preserved neural arch	Incertae sedis	
Plesiosauria indet.	Indeterminate	Hasle Klint	NHMD 625357-2 a complete rib	Resembles Microcleidus	
Plesiosauria indet.	Indeterminate	Hasle Klint	NHMD 625145 consists of an incomplete propodial	Incertae sedis	
Plesiosauroidea indet.	Indeterminate	Hasle Harbour	UH GM-V-2006-8, tooth	Incertae sedis	
Pliosauroidea indet.	Indeterminate	Hasle Harbour	MGUH DKV-2002-149, Fourteen isolated teeth	Resembles Attenborosaurus.	Attenborosaurus
Pliosauroidea indet.	Indeterminate	Hasle Klint	NHMD 625447, a single tooth	Resembles Rhomaleosaurus.	
Rhomaleosauridae indet.	Indeterminate	Hasle Harbour	GUH DKV 2002-70, tooth	Resembles Rhomaleosaurus.	Rhomaleosaurus

=== Thalattosuchia ===
Genus	Species	Location	Material	Notes	Images
Teleosauridae indet.	Indeterminate	Hasle Harbour	DK-1072, a dermal plate	A Teleosauridae Thalattosuchian. One of the northernmost fossil finds of the group and one of the few of the pliensbachian worldwide, it represents a genus whose dermal armor was similar to the genus Macrospondylus of the Toarcian.	Macrospondylus example of Teleosauroid

=== Pterosauria ===
Genus	Species	Location	Material	Notes	Images
Pterosauria? indet.	Indeterminate	Hasle Harbour	Uncertain Remains	A possible pterosaur. Is quoted the find of a "Flying Reptile" on the Hasle Sandstone by C. Malling at the beginning of the 20th century. No further data related to the find has been published.	Example of coeval Pterosaur, Dimorphodon

=== Theropods ===
Genus	Species	Location	Material	Notes	Images
Neotheropoda indet.	Indeterminate	Hasle Harbour	Propodial bone, possibly a radius	Theropod, incertae sedis inside Neotheropoda. Extremely hollow shaft suggests that it most likely belonged to a juvenile member of a theropod dinosaur.	Segisaurus a coeval North American genus
Stenonyx	S. isp.	Hasle Harbour	MGUH – 30889, single footprint	Considered a very small dinosaur, probably a juvenile. The foot resembles those of young Coelophysis from Ghost Ranch Quarries. Stenonyx footprints had been described from the Early Jurassic Soltykow (Hettangian) and an identical one from Szydlowek (Pliensbachian), linking southern Sweden, Bornholm and Poland, contiguous during the Early Jurassic and dinosaurs could thus freely roam this large area.	
Theropoda indet.	Indeterminate	Hasle Harbour	Isolated teeth	Theropod, incertae sedis	

=== Sauropodomorpha ===
Genus	Species	Location	Material	Notes	Images
Massopoda indet.	Indeterminate	Hasle Harbour	DK966, metatarsal, metapodial or a propodial bone	A Sauropodomorph of uncertain placement, probably a rather basal genus.	Mussaurus, a possible relative of DK966
Turiasauria indet.	Indeterminate	Hasle Harbour	NHMD 1185136, Isolated tooth	The oldest geological record of the family, likely represents a new unnamed taxon, estimated to have been 10–14 m long based on related taxa.	Turiasaur tooth NHMD 1185136 from the Hasle Formation

=== Synapsida ===
Genus	Species	Location	Material	Notes	Images
Tritylodontidae indet.	Indeterminate	Hasle Harbour	NHMD 1725979: an isolated tooth crown	Cannot be confidently placed within any known genus, it can be either a primitive Tritylodont related to specimens that lack post-canines (Yunnanodon, Dianzhongia), or an early derived genus of the Stereognathus group. It is the oldest occurrence of a mammaliamorph in Scandinavia.	Bienotherium, a coeval genus

== See also ==
- List of fossiliferous stratigraphic units in Denmark
- Blue Lias, England
- Charmouth Mudstone Formation, England
- Sorthat Formation, Denmark
- Zagaje Formation, Poland
- Drzewica Formation, Poland
- Ciechocinek Formation, Poland
- Borucice Formation, Poland
- Rotzo Formation, Italy
- Saltrio Formation, Italy
- Moltrasio Formation, Italy
- Marne di Monte Serrone, Italy
- Calcare di Sogno, Italy
- Podpeč Limestone, Slovenia
- Coimbra Formation, Portugal
- El Pedregal Formation, Spain
- Fernie Formation, Canada
- Whiteaves Formation, British Columbia
- Navajo Sandstone, Utah
- Aganane Formation, Morocco
- Tafraout Group, Morocco
- Azilal Formation, Morocco
- Budoš Limestone, Montenegro
- Kota Formation, India
- Cañadón Asfalto Formation, Argentina
- Los Molles Formation, Argentina
- Kandreho Formation, Madagascar
- Elliot Formation, South Africa
- Clarens Formation, South Africa
- Evergreen Formation, Australia
- Cattamarra Coal Measures, Australia
- Hanson Formation, Antarctica
- Mawson Formation, Antarctica
