= Sorthat Formation =

Geologic formation in Bornholm, Denmark

- Stratigraphic range: Latest Pliensbachian to Latest Toarcian; ~184–174 Ma Possible Lower Aalenian layers
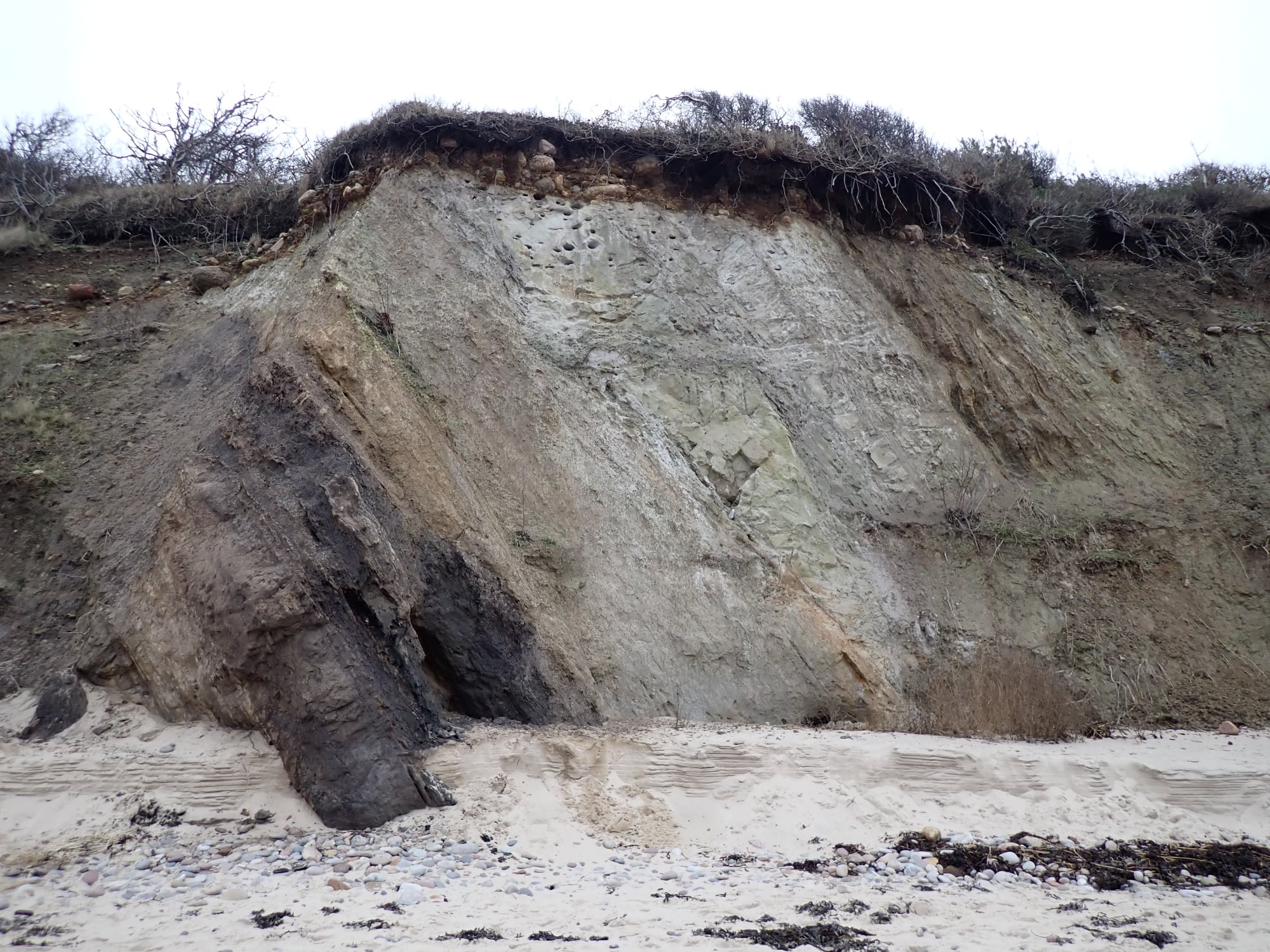
- Korsodde section of the Sorthat Formation, where the local Toarcian anoxic event stratum is located
- Type: Geological formation
- Unit of: Bornholm Group
- Sub-units: Sorthat & Levka beds
- Underlies: Bagå Formation
- Overlies: Rønne & Hasle Formations
- Thickness: 240 m (790 ft)

Lithology
- Primary: Claystone, sandstone

Location
- Coordinates: 55.09°N 14.42°E
- Approximate paleocoordinates: Approx. 35°N
- Region: Bornholm: Rønne Graben
- Country: Denmark, Germany (ex situ sandstones)

Type section
- Named for: Sorthat-Muleby, Bornholm
- Named by: Gry (as part of the Bagå Formation)
- Year defined: 1969
- Sorthat Formation (Denmark)

The Sorthat Formation is a geologic formation on Bornholm, Denmark, and the Rønne Graben, Baltic Sea, from the Latest Pliensbachian to Late Toarcian. It holds plant fossils and invertebrate traces, overlain by fluvial and lacustrine deposits of the Aalenian-Bathonian Bagå Formation. Initially classified as part of the Bagå Formation until 2003, it spans the Latest Pliensbachian to Early Aalenian. It reflects a deltaic to marine setting with eastern river systems forming in the Toarcian. Early Pliensbachian volcanism from southern Sweden extended across the North Sea. The Central Skåne Volcanic Province and Egersund Basin contributed volcanic material, affecting tectonics. Early Jurassic porphyritic nephelinite lavas in the Egersund Basin, akin to those in the formation's clay pits, suggest fluvial sediment transport to the Grimmen Formation and Ciechocinek Formation. The Grimmen Formation is its sister unit.

== Description ==
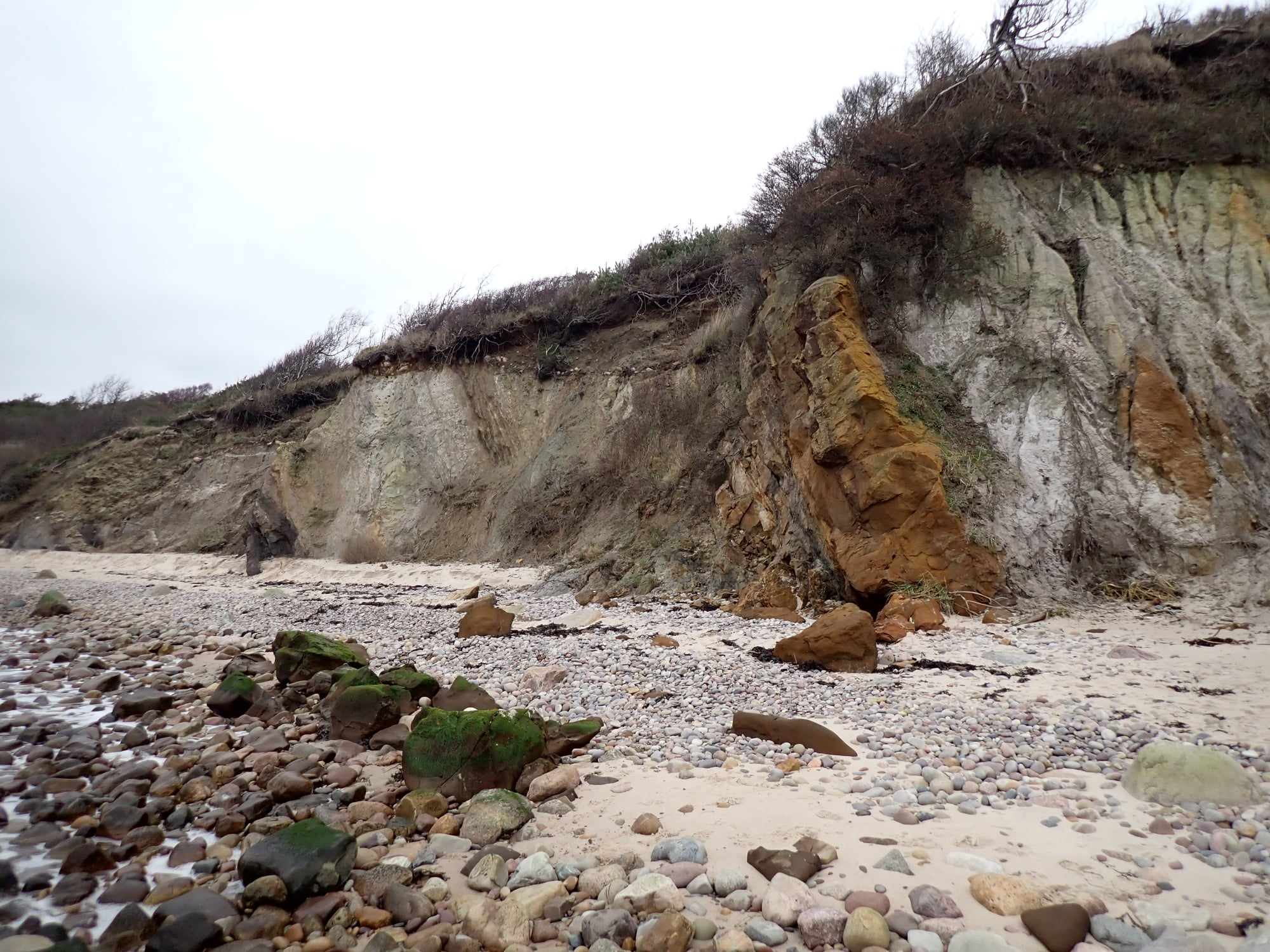
Sorthat Formation layers, mainly mudstones, claystones, and sandstone bands

Bornholm's Lower-Middle Jurassic includes the Rønne (Hettangian–Sinemurian), Hasle (Early–Late Pliensbachian), Sorthat, and Bagå Formations. Coal-bearing clays and sands overlie the Hasle Formation, divided between the Sorthat and Bagå. The Sorthat Formation aligns with the Röddinge Formation, sharing a fluvial system, and correlates with the Ciechocinek Formation, Fjerritslev Formation, and Rya Formation. Originally termed Levka, Sorthat, and Bagå beds, its key exposure is the Korsodde section. Faulting and scarce marine fossils hinder stratigraphic clarity. Palynological data from the Levka-1 core and Korsodde section date it to Late Pliensbachian–Toarcian, possibly Early Aalenian. Megaspores indicate Toarcian–Aalenian strata. It features bioturbated sands, heteroliths, clays, coal veins, and dinoflagellates, suggesting brackish to marine settings, capped by Bagå deposits.

The Sorthat Formation's lithology varies. The Levka-1 well reveals fining-upward units, 3–14 m thick, with coarse sand, muddy, coal- and mica-rich sands, clays, and coal seams. Parallel lamination dominates, with minor cross-bedding. Abundant plant fragments and quartz, but no marine palynomorphs, indicate a coastal delta plain. This mirrors the Ciechocinek Formation's Toarcian–Bajocian deltaic shoreline. The North German Basin shows four sea-level fluctuations forming delta generations, with Toarcian regressive deltas depositing 40 m in Prignitz and Brandenburg. Palynomorphs tie to the Sorthat Formation.

The upper formation (~40 m) has bioturbated sands, heteroliths, syneresis cracks, pyrite nodules, and ichnofossils like Planolites and Teichichnus, reflecting nearshore lagoons and channels. The 93 m Korsodde section, with organic-rich sands, suggests fluvial channels tied to coastal lakes, with plant remains and ichnofossils like Diplocraterion. The top features fine, yellowish-brown sands and sandstones with bioturbated, wave-rippled beds.

At Korsodde, the environment includes the following:

Stratigraphy of the Korsodde section
Unit	Lithology	Thickness (metres)	Type of environment	Fossil flora	Fossil fauna
Unit A	Yellow, weakly cemented muscovite quartz sandstone, medium- to fine-grained in the lower part, fine-grained in the upper part.	0.45–2.3 m	Estuarine channel fill (upper or marginal, less energetic part)	None recovered	Planolites isp.; Rosselia isp.; Bornichnus tortuosus; Diplocraterion parallelum
Unit B	Intercalations of muscovite quartz sandstones and dark mudstone drapes, with abundant heteroliths.	2.3–3.41 m	Upper tidal flat deposits surrounding an estuary	None recovered	Planolites isp.; Rosselia isp.; Palaeophycus isp.; B. tortuosus; D. parallelum
Unit C	Two main layers: a series of 20 cm dark mudstone with horizontal lamination and silt intercalations and a series of dark heteroliths with intercalated mudstones and ripple limestones.	3.41–3.7 m	Restricted bay passing into upper tidal flat deposits	None recovered	D. parallelum
Unit D	Yellow ripple cross sandstone with abundant muscovite, alternating with continuous and discontinuous dark mudstone with abundant organic material. There are pyrite concretions in the lower part.	3.7–4.7 m	Lower tidal flat within an estuary	Roots	Planolites isp.; Palaeophycus isp.; B. tortuosus; D. parallelum
Unit E	Mostly fine-grained sediments with abundant organic matter.	4.7–6.9 m	Lagoonal environment above a coal bed	Neocalamites sp. stems; Coal; Plant cuticles; Roots; Root structures	?Thalassinoides isp.; Planolites isp.; D. parallelum
Unit F	Mostly pale, fine-grained, ripple cross muddy sandstone and normal sandstone, separated by thin, pale sandy mudstones or thin mudstone drapes.	6.9–9.9 m	Tidal flat deposits in an estuary	Lignites; Root structures	?Thalassinoides isp.; ?Chondrites isp.; Rosselia isp.; Palaeophycus isp.; Planolites isp.; D. parallelum
Unit G	A prominent erosional surface at the start, composed of yellow medium- to fine-grained cross-laminated sandstones with muscovite.	9.9–11.35 m	Estuarine bar	None reported	None reported
Unit H	Pale, fine-grained ripple and herringbone sandstones and mudstones, with intercalations of sandy mudstones and mudstone drapes with intense ferruginization, and some layers of mudstone–sandstone heteroliths	11.35–14.2 m	Marginal part of an estuary channel fill	None reported	Rosselia isp.; Palaeophycus isp.; Cylindrichnus isp.; Skolithos isp.; D. parallelum
Unit I, J	Bioturbated muddy sandstone	14.2–14.4 m	Short-lived bay or lagoon	Neocalamites sp. logs	Rosselia isp.; Teichichnus isp.; Teichichnus zigzag; Planolites isp.; Thalassinoides isp.; Palaeophycus isp.

== Biota ==
The Sorthat Formation hosts a rich Pliensbachian–Toarcian flora, one of Europe's most complete for this period, with significant Jurassic palynological deposits. The flora, including gymnosperms, ferns (e.g., Dicksonia, Coniopteris, Osmundaceae), and thin-cutinised leaves like Podozamites and Equisetales, suggests a warm, humid climate conducive to diverse vegetation.

=== Environment ===
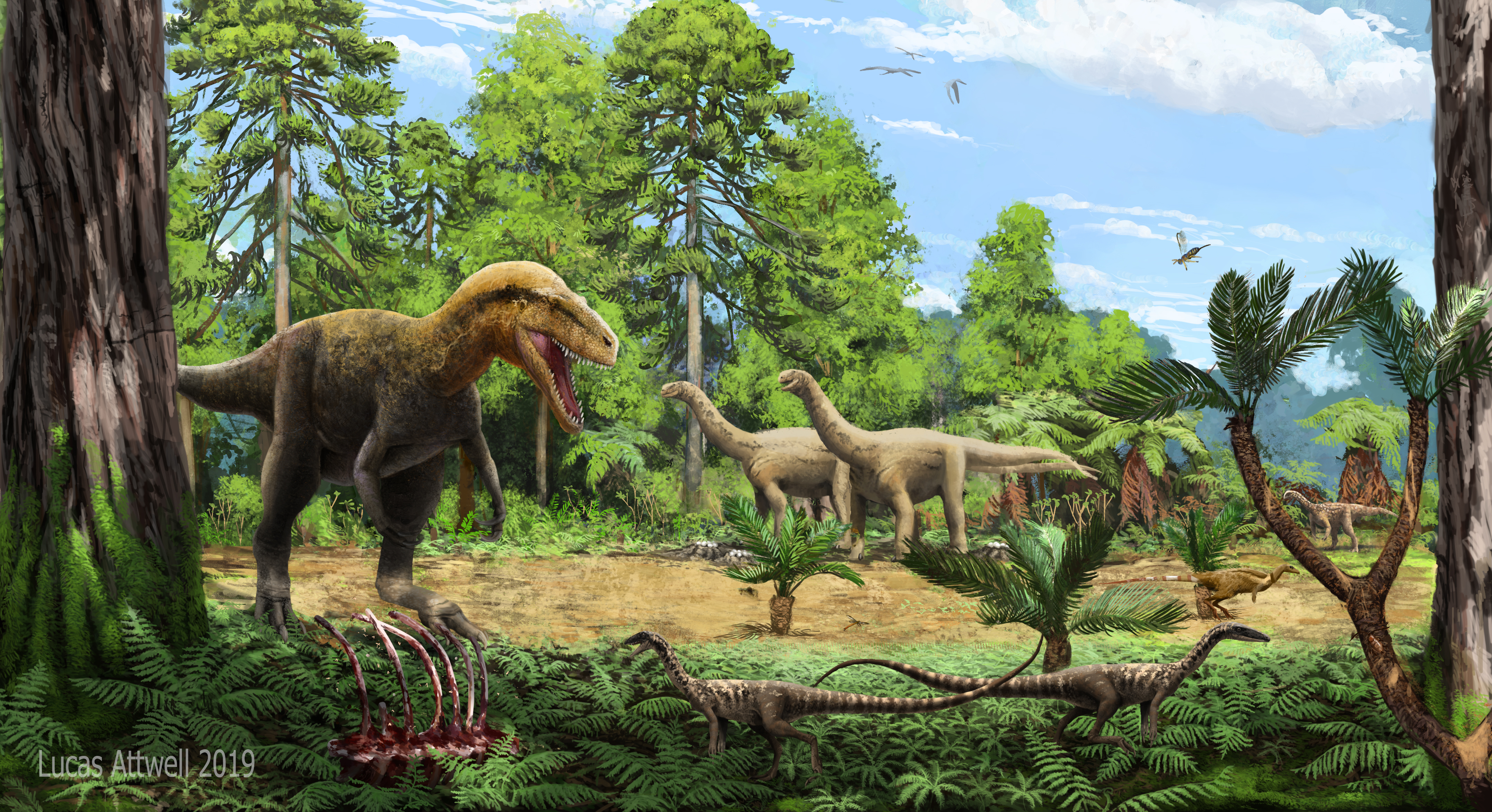
Late Pliensbachian–Early Toarcian Fennoscandinavia, with flora based on the Sorthat Formation and fauna from the Lehmhagen Member, Grimmen Formation and Drzewica Formation.

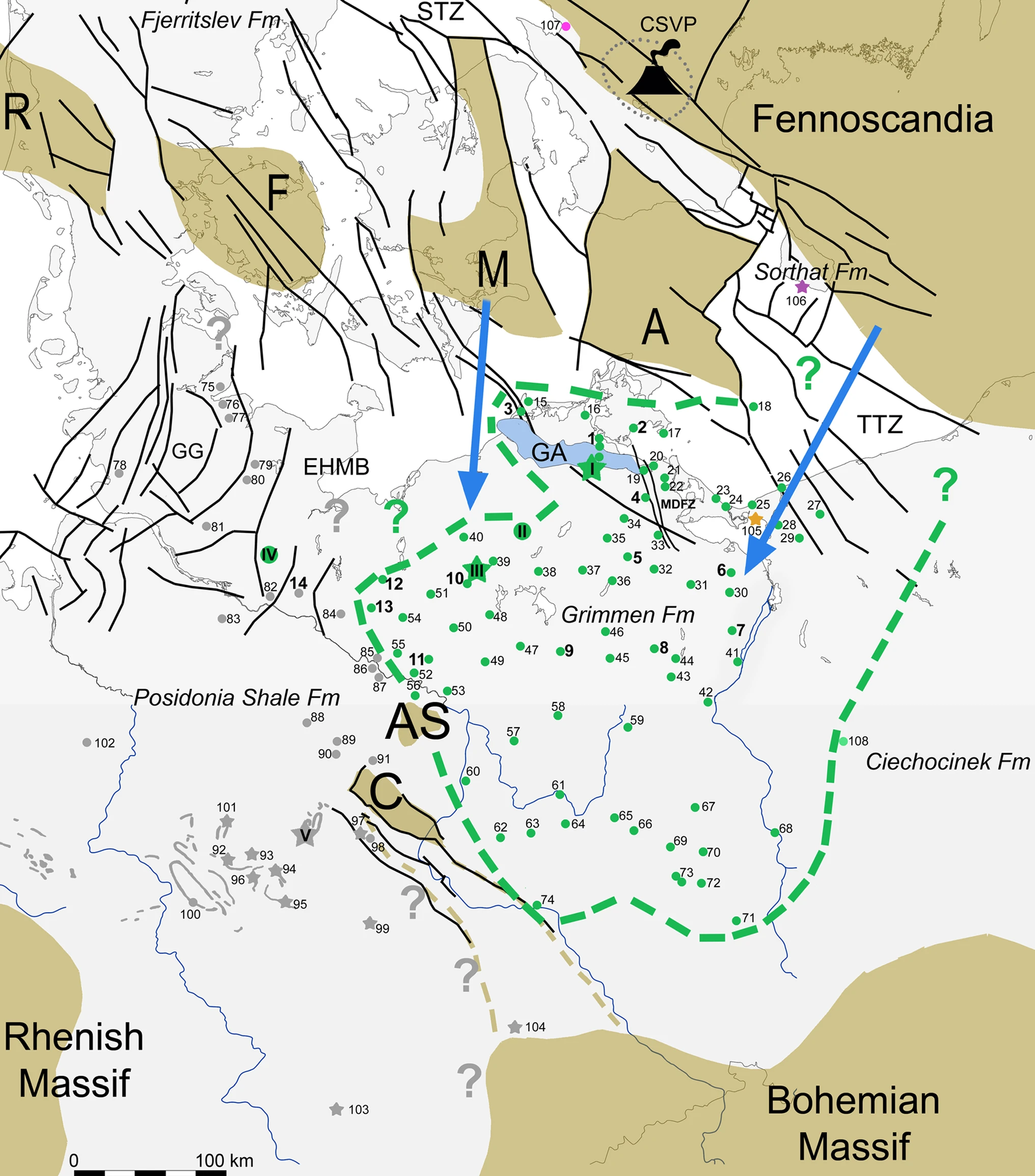
Paleogeography of the North German basin in the Toarcian, showing the Grimmen Formation and Sorthat Formation extent.

The Sorthat Formation, deposited in the Rønne Graben and on Bornholm's coasts, reflects a deltaic to marine environment, with the Grimmen Formation as its sister unit. A modern analog is New Zealand's Northland humid coastal forests, where peat-forming woodlands thrive. The Stina-1 well shows sand, clay, and coal, indicating an emerged graben. High kaolinite and reworked Carboniferous palynomorphs suggest erosion of a Carboniferous regolith. A Late Pliensbachian regression allowed coal deposition, halted by an Early Toarcian transgression. The Levka-1 well and Korsodde section show lagoons, channels, and floodplains, with rapid subsidence in the Rønne Graben during the Toarcian. Shoreface deposits with bioturbation mark a deepening trend, correlating with the Fjerritslev Formation. Depositional settings include the Levka Beds, interpreted as fluvial channels, floodplains, and peat swamps. Marine palynomorphs (e.g., Nannoceratopsis) indicate lagoonal settings. The Sorthat Beds represent delta plain deposits with pyrite nodules and Arenicolites traces. The Korsodde Section was a fluvial channel sands with coal and rootlets, transitioning to lagoons and palaeosols, with dinoflagellates (e.g., Mendicodinium). Outside emerged Bornholm, offshore Rønne and Kolobrzeg grabens include mostly fluvial-coastal layers, fed by regional currents.

The Sorthat Formation, with the Grimmen Formation as its sister unit, records significant vegetation changes during the Early Toarcian, linked to carbon cycle perturbations and the Toarcian oceanic anoxic event, driven by large-scale volcanism. A modern analog is New Zealand's Northland humid coastal forests, supporting peat-forming woodlands.

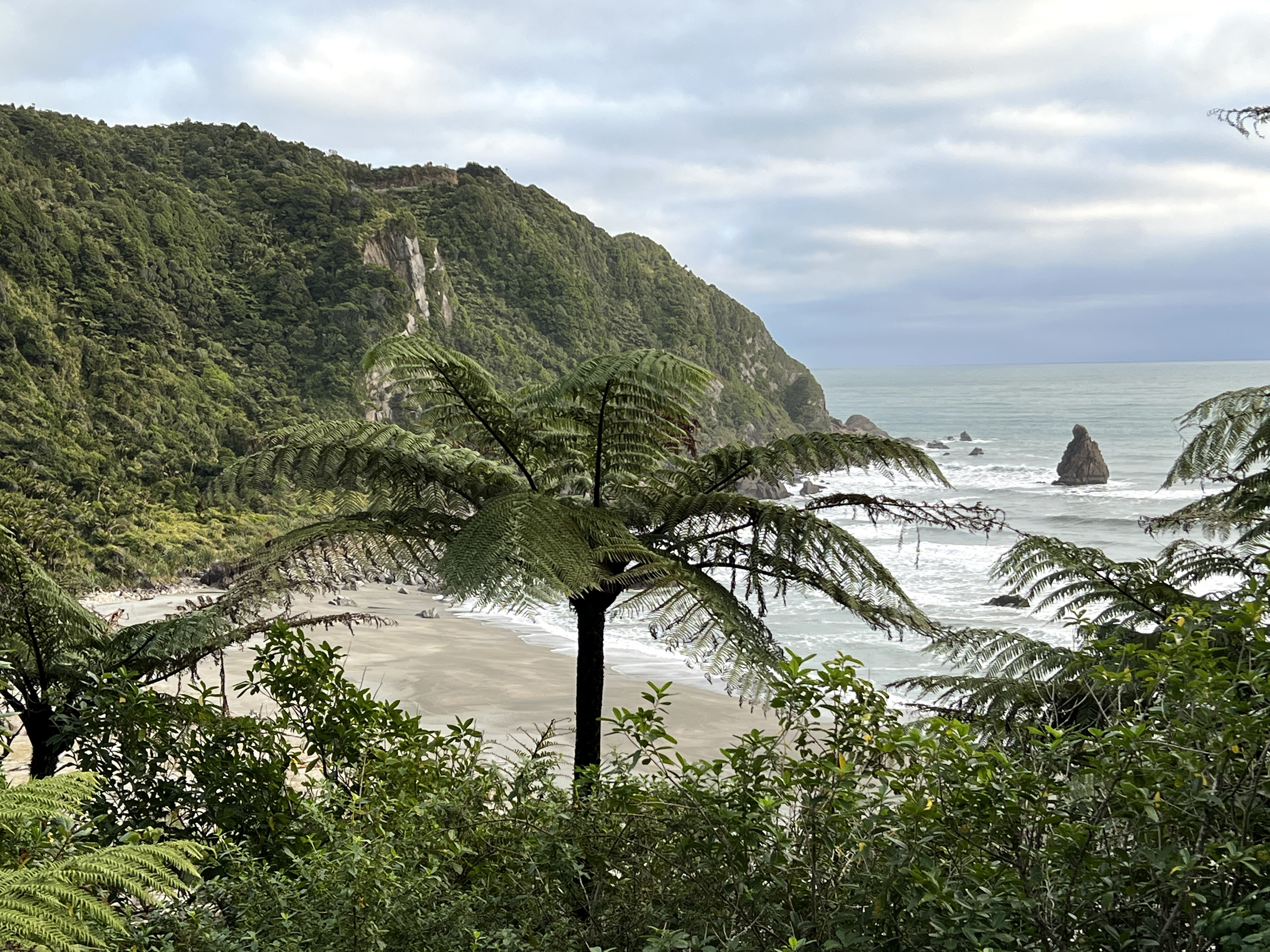
The Sorthat Fm was a cold, humid y forested setting, whose best modern analogs can be found in New Zealand

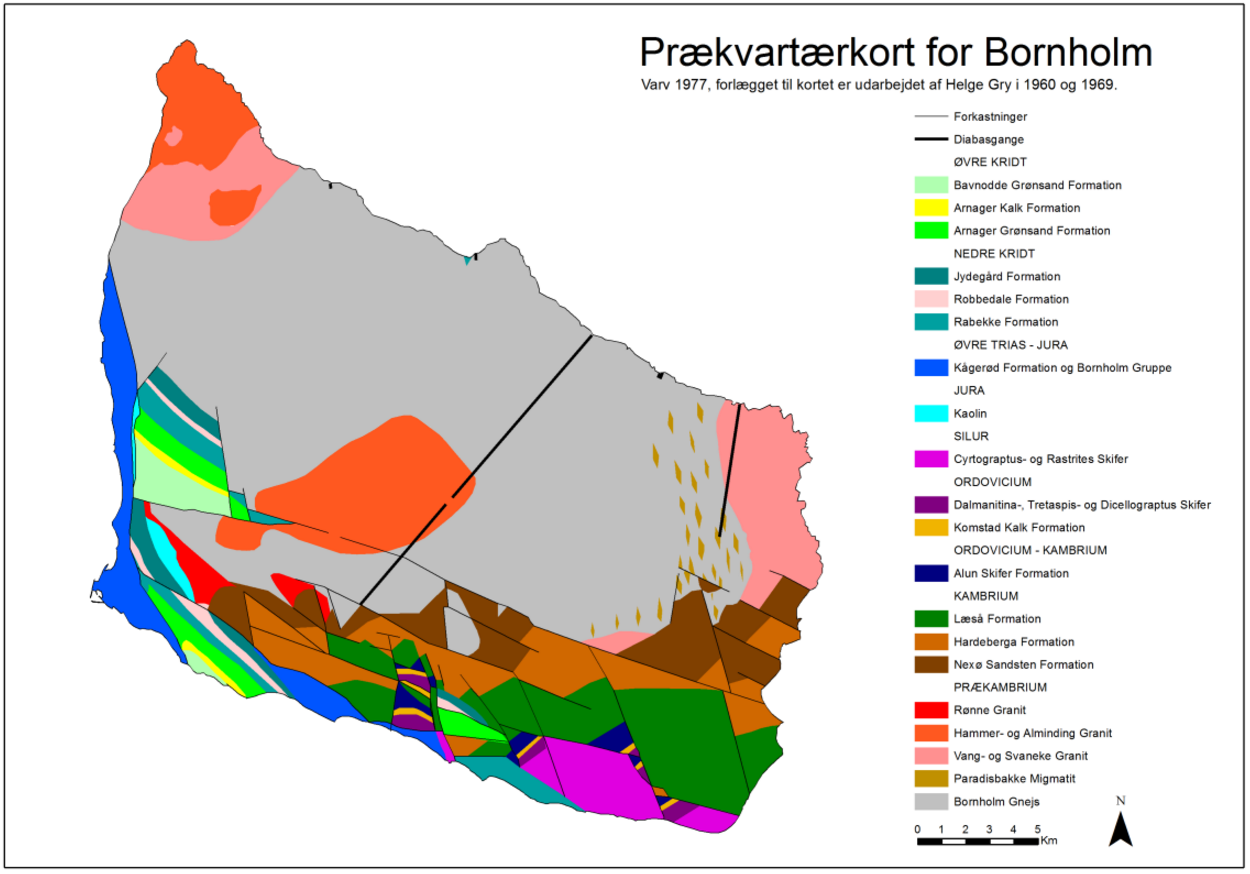
Stratigraphic map of Bornholm

In the Late Pliensbachian, pollen assemblages, dominated by Cupressaceae (e.g., Perinopollenites) and cycads (Cycadopites), indicate a warm, humid Mediterranean climate. During the Toarcian event, spore-rich layers reflect a shift to ferns and lycophytes, suggesting increased humidity. Post-event, Hirmeriellaceae pollen (e.g., Corollina, Spheripollenites) dominates, indicating a drier, warmer climate. Woody vegetation shows changes in carbon isotopes, with pollen from Sciadopityaceae, Miroviaceae (Cerebropollenites), cycads (Chasmatosporites), and Corollina. Macroflora, mainly from the Hasle clay pit and Korsodde section, includes 68 species, 50% ferns. The Late Pliensbachian flora, rich in ferns and sphenophytes, grew in marshy floodplains along a meandering river, with Bennettites as shrubs and conifers (e.g., Pagiophyllum) and ginkgoaleans as trees, reflecting a warm, seasonal climate. In the Toarcian, Hirmeriellaceae conifers (95% of pollen), seed ferns, Bennettites, and Czekanowskiales dominate, with Pagiophyllum and Corollina torosus indicating high temperatures, aridity, and seasonal wildfires. Wood fragments, both macroscopic and microscopic (0.25–1 mm), are common in Korsodde's nearshore deposits.

Coal seams, mainly from Levka-1 and Korsodde, formed in anoxic, nutrient-rich swamps. Peat accumulated rapidly (~1 mm/yr), akin to Central Kalimantan, in a warm, humid climate. High huminite content (e.g., Eu-ulminite, densinite) indicates anoxic conditions. Wildfires, evidenced by charcoal, increased during the Toarcian oceanic anoxic event, reflecting drier conditions. Coals can be found at Levka-1 (112 m of coal, sand, and clay with abundant coalified wood), representing fluvial channels and floodplains with lagoons. At Korsodde six coal seams from a coastal lagoon setting can be found, with huminite-rich coal and dinoflagellates like Mendicodinium reticulatum.

=== Fungi ===
Color key: Taxon / Reclassified taxon / Taxon falsely reported as present / Dubious taxon or junior synonym / Ichnotaxon / Ootaxon / Morphotaxon

Notes
Uncertain or tentative taxa are in small text
~~crossed out~~ taxa are discredited.

Genus	Species	Stratigraphic position	Material	Notes	Images
Fungi	"Morphotype A"; "Morphotype B"; "Morphotype C"	Korsodde section	Fungal spores; Hyphae?	Fungal spores of uncertain classification. The three uppermost samples of the Korssode section are poor in diversity, but fungal spores are common in at least one sample; these have not been recorded from the samples below.	Extant Geastrum campestre specimen, found linked with plant matter. Spores recovered on the Sorthat Formation may be derived from similar fungi.

=== Phytoplankton ===
In the Lower Jurassic of Bornholm there were several successions of nearshore peat formations with dinoflagellates. Coal-bearing strata were deposited in an overall coastal plain environment during the Hettangian–Sinemurian, and then during the Early Pliensbachian deposition was interrupted until the late Pliensbachian–Lowermost Toarcian due to a sea regression.

Genus	Species	Stratigraphic position	Material	Notes	Images
Baltisphaeridium	B. infulatum	Korsodde section	Cysts	An algal acritarch, probably related to freshwater red algae, similar to extant Florideophyceae (for example, Hildenbrandia) or Batrachospermales (Batrachospermum) and Thoreales.	Extant Hildenbrandia; Baltisphaeridium may be derived from a similar genus
Botryococcus	B. sp.	Korsodde section; Sorthat beds; Levka-1 borehole	Miospores	Type genus of the Botryococcaceae in the Trebouxiales. A colonial green microalga of freshwater and brackish ponds and lakes around the world, where it often can be found in large floating masses. Sorthat Formation Botryococcus lived in an environment interpreted as a coastal lake, permanently vegetated and shallow, that was occasionally flooded by the sea.	Extant specimen
Chomotriletes	C. minor	Korsodde section; Levka-1 borehole; Sorthat beds	Miospores	Affinities with the family Zygnemataceae. A genus derived from freshwater filamentous or unicellular, uniseriate (unbranched) green algae.	
Crassosphaera	C. coccinia; C. hexagonalis	Korsodde section	Miospores	Affinities with the family Pycnococcaceae.	
Cymatiosphaera	C. sp.	Korsodde section; Sorthat beds	Miospores	Affinities with the family Pterospermopsidaceae.	
Haplophragmoides	H. tryssa; H. platus; H. sp.	Sorthat beds	Cysts	A foraminifer, member of the family Lituoloidea in the Lituolida.	
Korystocysta	K. sp.	Korsodde section	Cysts	A dinoflagellate, member of the Cribroperidinioideae.	
Lecaniella	L. foveata	Korsodde section; Levka-1 borehole; Sorthat beds	Miospores	Affinities with the family Zygnemataceae.	
Leiosphaerida	L. spp.	Korsodde section; Levka-1 borehole; Sorthat beds	Miospores	Affinities with the family Prasinophyceae.	
Luehndea	L. spinosa	Korsodde section	Cysts	A dinoflagellate, member of the Luehndeoideae. It establishes the Luehndea spinosa zone; the age of this zone is late Pliensbachian to early Toarcian.	
Mancodinium	M. semitabulatum	Korsodde section	Cysts	A dinoflagellate, type genus of the Mancodinioideae.	
Mendicodinium	M. groenlandicum; M. reticulatum	Korsodde section; Sorthat beds	Cysts	A dinoflagellate, member of the family Gonyaulacales.	
Micrhystridium	M. fragile; M. intromittum; M. lymensis; M. spp.	Korsodde section; Levka-1 borehole	Cysts	An acritarch, familia incertae sedis	
Nannoceratopsis	N. senex; N. gracilis; N. ridingui; N. triangulata; N. triceras; N. dictyanbonis; N. sp.	Korsodde section; Levka-1 borehole; Sorthat beds	Cysts	A dinoflagellate, member of the family Nannoceratopsiaceae. It is characteristic of marine deposits. The presence of N. gracilis, N. senex and N. triceras, and common occurrence of Botryococcus is interpreted as indicating a lagoon succession overlying a transgressive surface and signals a rise in relative sea level.	
Ovoidites	O. sp. A; O. sp. B; O. sp. C; O. spp.	Korsodde section; Levka-1 borehole	Miospores	Affinities with the family Zygnemataceae. A genus derived from freshwater filamentous or unicellular, uniseriate (unbranched) green algae.	Extant Spirogyra; Ovoidites may be derived from a similar genus
Pterospermella	P. spp.	Korsodde section	Miospores	Affinities with the family Pterospermataceae.	
Rotundus	R. granulatus	Sorthat beds	Miospores	An algal palynomorph unique to the setting and probably related to freshwater red algae; similar to extant Batrachospermales.	Extant Batrachospermum
Spirillina	S. sp.	Sorthat beds	Miospores	A foraminifer, type genus of the Spirillinidae in the Spirillinida.	
Striatella	S. jurassica; S. parva; S. seebergensis; S. scanica	Korsodde section; Levka-1 borehole; Sorthat beds	Miospores	Brown algae, type genus of the family Striatellaceae in the Striatellales. These brown algae diatoms are associated with either brackish or marginal marine environments.	
Tasmanites	T. sp.	Korsodde section; Levka-1 borehole; Sorthat beds	Miospores	Affinities with the family Pyramimonadaceae. Found on shoreface and shoreface–offshore transition zone deposits.	
Tetraporina	T. compressa	Korsodde section; Levka-1 borehole; Sorthat beds	Miospores	Affinities with the family Zygnemataceae.	
Veryhachium	V. spp.	Levka-1 borehole	Cysts	A dinoflagellate, member of the Dinophyceae.	

=== Bryophyta ===
Genus	Species	Stratigraphic position	Material	Notes	Images
Cingutriletes	C. infrapunctus; C. oculus	Korsodde section	Spores	Incertae sedis; affinities with Bryophyta. This spore is found in Jurassic sediments associated with the polar regions. The Sorthat Formation is among its southernmost locations.	
Foraminisporis	F. jurassicus	Korsodde section	Spores	Affinities with the family Notothyladaceae in the Anthocerotopsida. Hornwort spores.	Extant Notothylas specimens; Foraminisporis probably come from similar genera.
Polycingulatisporites	P. circulus; P. liassicus; P. triangularis	Levka-1 borehole; Korsodde section	Spores	Affinities with the family Notothyladaceae in the Anthocerotopsida. Hornwort spores.	
Sculptisporis	S. aulosenensis	Sorthat beds; Korsodde section	Spores	Affinities with the family Sphagnaceae in the Sphagnopsida.	
Staplinisporites	S. caminus	Korsodde section	Spores	Affinities with the family Encalyptaceae in the Bryopsida. Branching moss spores, indicating high water-depleting environments.	Extant Encalypta specimens; Staplinisporites probably come from similar genera
Stereisporites	S. antiquasporites; S. stereoides	Levka-1 borehole; Sorthat beds; Korsodde section	Spores	Affinities with the family Sphagnaceae in the Sphagnopsida. "Peat moss" spores, related to genera such as Sphagnum that can store large amounts of water.	Extant Sphagnum specimens; Stereisporites, Sculptisporis and Rogalskaisporites probably come from similar genera
Taurocusporites	T. verrucatus	Korsodde section	Spores	Affinities with the family Sphagnaceae in the Sphagnopsida.	
Rogalskaisporites	R. cicatricosus	Levka-1 borehole; Sorthat beds; Korsodde section	Spores	Affinities with the family Sphagnaceae in the Sphagnopsida.	

=== Lycophyta ===
Genus	Species	Stratigraphic position	Material	Notes	Images
Anapiculatisporites	A. spiniger; A. sp.	Levka-1 borehole; Korsodde section	Spores	Affinities with the Selaginellaceae in the Lycopsida. Herbaceous lycophyte flora, similar to ferns, found in humid settings. This family of spores are also the most diverse in the formation.	Extant Selaginella, typical example of Selaginellaceae. Genera like Anapiculatisporites or Densoisporites probably come from a similar or a related Plant
Cadargasporites	C. granulatus	Korsodde section	Spores	Affinities with the Selaginellaceae in the Lycopsida.	
Camarozonosporites	C. golzowensis; C. rudis	Korsodde section	Spores	Affinities with the family Lycopodiaceae in the Lycopodiopsida.	
Kraeuselisporites	K. reissingeri	Korsodde section	Spores	Affinities with the Selaginellaceae in the Lycopsida.	
Neoraistrickia	N. gristhorpensis; N. sp.	Levka-1 borehole; Sorthat beds; Korsode section	Spores	Affinities with the Selaginellaceae in the Lycopsida.	
Retitriletes	R. austroclavatidites; R. clavatoides; R. semimurus; R. spp.	Korsodde section; Levka-1 borehole; Sorthat beds	Spores	Affinities with the family Lycopodiaceae in the Lycopodiopsida.	
Selaginellites	S. falcatus	Hasle clay pit	Fine stems	Affinities with Selaginellaceae and Lycopodiidae in the Lycopodiales. It was originally described as Lycopodites falcatus. The leaves of this species are more prominently anisophyllous than in the Raheto-Hettangian S. coburgensis from Franconia.	
Sestrosporites	S. pseudoalveolatus	Sorthat beds; Korsodde section	Spores	Affinities with the family Lycopodiaceae in the Lycopodiopsida. Lycopod spores, related to herbaceous to arbustive flora common in humid environments.	Extant Lycopodium specimens. Genera like Sestrosporites, Camarozonosporites, Retitriletes, Lycopodiumsporites and Semiretisporis probably come from a similar plant
Uvaesporites	U. argenteaeformis; U. microverrucatus; U. puzzlei	Levka-1 borehole; Sorthat beds; Korsodde section	Spores	Affinities with the Selaginellaceae in the Lycopsida.	

=== Equisetales ===
Genus	Species	Stratigraphic position	Material	Notes	Images
Calamospora	C. tener	Levka-1 borehole; Sorthat beds; Korsodde section	Spores	Affinities with the Calamitaceae in the Equisetales. Horsetails are herbaceous flora found in humid environments and are flooding-tolerant. In the sections of the formation such as Korsodde, this genus has small peaks in abundance in the layers where more Equisetites stems are found.	Reconstruction of the genus Calamites, found associated with Calamospora
Equisetites	E. munsteri; E. lyelli; E. sp.	Bagagraven clay pit; Nebbeodde; Stina-1 well	Stems	Affinities with Equisetaceae in the Equisetales. Related equisetalean stems are found in the Hettangian strata along Skane, Sweden. In the lagoonar sections there is correlation between bioturbation and transported Equisetites stems. Local Equisetales reached a considerable size, comparable to modern subtropical bamboos, close to lakes and in the wettest environments.	Equisetites specimens from Germany
Neocalamites	N. hoerensis; N. sp.	Korsodde section; Bagagraven clay pit	Three incomplete axes; Isolated Incomplete fragments	Affinities with Calamitaceae in the Equisetales. Related equisetalean stems are found in strata of the same age along Skane, Sweden. Based on analogies with morphologically similar extant Equisetum species, it is interpreted to represent a plant of consistently moist habitats, such as marshes, lake margins or forest understorey, normally developing dense thickets.	Neocalamites specimen from Austria
Phyllotheca	P. cf. equisetiformis	Hasle clay pit	Leaf whorls	Affinities with Equisetidae in the Equisetales.	

=== Pteridophyta ===
Genus	Species	Stratigraphic position	Material	Notes	Images
Annulispora	A. folliculosa	Korsodde section	Spores	Affinities with the genus Saccoloma, type representative of the family Saccolomataceae. This fern spore resembles those of the living genus Saccoloma, being probably from a pantropical genus found in wet, shaded forest areas.	Extant Saccoloma specimens; Annulispora probably comes from similar genera or maybe a species in the genus
Baculatisporites	B. comaumensis; B. primarius; B. wellmanii; B. sp.	Korsodde section; Levka-1 borehole; Sorthat beds	Spores	Affinities with the family Osmundaceae in the Polypodiopsida. Near fluvial current ferns, related to the modern Osmunda regalis.	Extant Osmunda specimens; Baculatisporites and Todisporites probably come from similar genera or maybe a species from the genus
Cladophlebis	C. nebbensis; C. roesserti; C. svedbergii; C. hirta	Vellengsby; Bagagraven clay pit; Hasle clay pit; Nebbeodde	Isolated pinnae	Affinities with Osmundaceae in the Osmundales. Related to species commonly reported from the Triassic–Jurassic of southern Sweden.	Cladophlebis nebbensis specimen from Japan
Cladotheca	C. undans	Bagagraven clay pit	Fertile pinna fragments	Affinities with Osmundaceae in the Osmundales. Specimens assigned to this morphothype have been found in the Middle Jurassic flora of Yorkshire, associated with Todites miospores, and were originally described as Asplenites cladophleboides.	
Cibotiumspora	C. jurienensis	Sorthat beds; Korsodde section	Spores	Affinities with the family Cyatheaceae in the Cyatheales. Arboreal fern spores.	
Clathropteris	C. meniscioides; C. platyphylla	Bagagraven clay pit; Hasle clay pit; Nebbeodde	Isolated pinnae	Affinities with Dipteridaceae in the Polypodiales.	Clathropteris meniscioides specimen from an unknown location
Conbaculatisporites	C. mesozoicus; C. spinosus	Levka-1 borehole; Sorthat beds; Korsodde section	Spores	Incertae sedis; affinities with the Pteridophyta	
Coniopteris	C. hymenophylloides; C. acutidens	Bagagraven clay pit	Incomplete frond fragment	Affinities with Polypodiales in the Polypodiidae. Common cosmopolitan Mesozoic fern genus. Recent research has reinterpreted it a stem group of the Polypodiales (closely related to the extant genera Dennstaedtia, Lindsaea, and Odontosoria).	Coniopteris specimen from Hungary
Deltoidospora	D. minor; D. toralis; D. spp.	Korsodde section; Levka beds; Sorthat beds	Spores	Incertae sedis; affinities with the Pteridophyta	
Dicksonia	D. pingelii; D. pauciloba	Bagagraven clay pit; Hasle clay pit	Leaflets	Affinities with Dicksoniaceae in the Cyatheales. It show similarities with Sphenopteris longipinnata in the morphological outline of the leaflets and the keels of the pinnate axis.	Extant Dicksonia
Dictyophyllum	D. acutilobium; D. munsteri; D. barthollini; D. cf. nilssonii; D. cf. spectabile	Vellengsby; Bagagraven clay pit; Hasle clay pit	Isolated pinnae	Affinities with Dipteridaceae in the Polypodiales. Dictyophyllum is a common dipteridacean genus of the mid-Mesozoic.	Dictyophyllum nilssonii specimen from an unknown location
Eboracia	E. lobifolia; E. sp.	Bagagraven clay pit; Hasle clay pit; Vellengsby	Isolated pinnae	Affinities with Dicksoniaceae in the Cyatheales. The Lund material is dominated by ferns belonging to the genus Eboracia (28 specimens of E. lobifolia and 14 of another Eboracia sp.). The latter has smaller pinnules than E. lobifolia.	
Gleicheniidites	G. senonicus	Levka-1 borehole; Korsodde section	Spores	Affinities with the Gleicheniales in the Polypodiopsida. Fern spores from low herbaceous flora.	Extant Gleichenia specimens; Gleicheniidites and Iraqispora probably come from similar genera or maybe a species in the genus
Gutbiera	G. angustiloba	Vellengsby; Nebbeodde	Isolated pinnae	Affinities with Matoniaceae in the Gleicheniales.	
Hausmannia	H. crenata; H. dichotoma; H. dentata; H. lasciniata; H. acutidens	Bagagraven clay pit; Hasle clay pit	Isolated pinnae	Affinities with Dipteridaceae in the Polypodiales. Specimens from the same species have been found in the Hettangian Höör Sandstone at southern Sweden.	
Intrapunctisporis	I. toralis	Sorthat beds	Spores	Incertae sedis; affinities with the Pteridophyta	
Iraqispora	I. labrata	Korsodde section	Spores	Affinities with the Gleicheniales in the Polypodiopsida. Fern spores from low herbaceous flora.	
Ischyosporites	I. crateris; I. variegatus	Levka-1 borehole; Korsodde section	Spores	Incertae sedis; affinities with the Pteridophyta	
Klukisporites	K. lacunus	Korsodde section	Spores	Affinities with the family Lygodiaceae in the Polypodiopsida. Climbing fern spores.	Extant Lygodium; Lygodioisporites probably comes from similar genera or maybe a species from the genus
Laevigatosporites	L. mesozoicus	Korsodde section; Levka-1 borehole	Spores	Incertae sedis; affinities with the Pteridophyta	
Leptolepidites	L. bossus; L. macroverrucosus; L. major; L. sp.	Korsodde section	Spores	Affinities with the family Dennstaedtiaceae in the Polypodiales. Forest fern spores.	Extant Dennstaedtia specimens; Leptolepidites probably comes from similar genera
Lycopodiacidites	L. infragranulatus; L. infragranulatus	Levka-1 borehole; Sorthat beds; Korsodde section	Spores	Affinities with the Ophioglossaceae in the Filicales. Fern spores from lower herbaceous flora.	Extant Helminthostachys specimens; Lycopodiacidites probably comes from similar genera or maybe a species from the genus
Manumia	M. delcourtii	Levka-1 borehole; Sorthat beds; Kosodde section	Spores	Affinities with the Pteridaceae in the Polypodiopsida. Forest ferns from humid ground locations.	Extant Pityrogramma specimens; Contignisporites and Manumia probably come from similar genera or maybe a species in the genus
Marattia	M. munsteri	Vellengsby	Isolated pinnae	Affinities with Marattiaceae in the Marattiopsida.	Extant Marattia specimen
Marattisporites	M. scabratus	Levka-1 borehole; Sorthat beds; Korsodde section	Spores	Affinities with the Marattiaceae in the Polypodiopsida. Fern spores from low herbaceous flora.	Extant Marattia specimens; Marattisporites probably comes from similar genera
Phlebopteris	P. schouwii; P. elegans; P. mirovensis; P. woodwardii; P. affinis; P. polypodioides	Vellengsby; Bagagraven clay pit; Hasle clay pit; Nebbeodde	Isolated pinnae	Affinities with Matoniaceae in the Gleicheniales.	Phlebopteris specimen from an unknown location
Skarbysporites	S. crassexinius	Sorthat beds; Korsodde section	Spores	Incertae sedis; affinities with the Pteridophyta	
Spiropteris	S. sp.	Bagagraven clay pit	Single impression	Incertae ordinis in the Pteridophyta. Spiropteris is the name given to the fossil of a coiled, unopened fern leaf.	
Tigrisporites	T. halleinis; T. microrugulatus	Sorthat beds; Korsodde section	Spores	Incertae sedis; affinities with the Pteridophyta	
Thaumatopteris	T. brauniana	Vellengsby; Bagagraven clay pit	Isolated pinnae	Affinities with Dipteridaceae in the Polypodiales.	Thaumatopteris specimen from Germany
Todisporites	T. major; T. minor	Levka-1 borehole; Sorthat beds	Spores	Affinities with the family Osmundaceae in the Polypodiopsida.	
Tripartina	T. variabilis	Levka-1 borehole; Sorthat beds; Korsodde section	Spores	Affinities with the genus Dicksoniaceae in the Polypodiopsida. Tree fern spores.	Extant Lophosoria specimens; Tripartina and Undulatisporites probably come from similar genera
Verrucosisporites	V. obscurilaesuratus	Korsodde section	Spores	Incertae sedis; affinities with the Pteridophyta	
Vesicaspora	V. fuscus	Korsodde section	Spores	Affinities with the Callistophytaceae in the Callistophytales. Spores from large arboreal to arbustive ferns.	
Zebrasporites	Z. interscriptus	Korsodde section	Spores	Affinities with the family Cyatheaceae in the Cyatheales. Arboreal fern spores.	Extant Cyathea; Zebrasporites and Cibotiumspora probably come from similar genera

=== "Peltaspermales"/Indet. Spermatophytes ===
Genus	Species	Stratigraphic position	Material	Notes	Images
Alisporites	A. grandis; A. radialis; A. robustus; A. thomasii; A. microsaccus; A. diaphanus	Levka-1 borehole; Sorthat beds; Korsodde section	Pollen	Affinities with the families Peltaspermaceae, Corystospermaceae or Umkomasiaceae in the Peltaspermales. Pollen of uncertain provenance that can be derived from any of the members of the Peltaspermales. The lack of distinctive characters and poor conservation make this pollen difficult to classify. Arboreal to arbustive seed ferns.	
Carpolithes	C. cinctus; C. nebbensis; C. nummularius	Vellengsby; Bagagraven clay pit; Nebbeodde	Plant propagules	Plant propagules that may be from Pteridospermatophyta, Vladimariales, Bennettitales or Pinales. Fruits or seeds of uncertain placement.	Extant Cephalotaxus fruits. Some Carpolithes are similar conifer-derived propagules.
Ctenozamites	C. leckenbyi	Bagagraven clay pit	Isolated pinnae	Affinities with Umkomasiaceae in the Pteridospermatophyta.	
Cycadopteris	C. heterophylla; C. brauniana	Bagagraven clay pit	Isolated pinnae	Affinities with Corystospermaceae in the Pteridospermatophyta.	Cycadopteris specimen from an unknown location
Feildenia	F. cuspiformis	Hasle clay pit	Leaf compressions	Affinities with Umaltolepidaceae in the Vladimariales. These belong to a group parallel to Gingkoaceans and derived probably from Umkomasiaceae.	
Kekryphalospora	K. distincta	Sorthat beds; Levka-1 borehole; Korsodde section	Pollen	Affinities with the families Peltaspermaceae, Corystospermaceae or Umkomasiaceae in the Peltaspermales.	
Komlopteris	K. nordenskioeldii	Vellengsby; Korsodde section	Isolated pinnae	Affinities with Umkomasiaceae in the Pteridospermatophyta.	
Pachypteris	P. laceolata; P. papillosa	Vellengsby; Korsodde section	Isolated pinnae	Affinities with Umkomasiaceae in the Pteridospermatophyta. Less common than other arboreal plants.	
Ptilozamites	P. falcatus; P. cycadea	Bagagraven clay pit	Isolated pinnae	Affinities with Umkomasiaceae in the Pteridospermatophyta.	Ptilozamites specimen from Italy
Pteridospermae	Indeterminate	Korsodde section	Cuticles	Affinities with Pteridospermae in the Pteridospermatophyta.	
Sagenopteris	S. cuneata; S. phillipsi; S. rhoifolia; S. nilssoniana; S. undulata; S. sp.	Vellengsby; Bagagraven clay pit	Isolated pinnae	Affinities with Caytoniaceae in the Pteridospermatophyta. Related to seed ferns present in the Rhaetic flora of Sweden.	Sagenopteris specimen from an unknown location
Vitreisporites	V. bjuvensis; V. pallidus	Levka-1 borehole; Korsodde section	Pollen	From the family Caytoniaceae in the Caytoniales. Caytoniaceae are a complex group of Mesozoic fossil floras that may be related to both Peltaspermales and Ginkgoaceae.	

=== Erdtmanithecales ===
Genus	Species	Stratigraphic position	Material	Notes	Images
Eucommiidites	E. major; E. troedssonii; E. sp.	Levka-1 borehole; Sorthat beds; Korsodde section	Pollen	Type pollen of the Erdtmanithecales, related to the Gnetales. Thick tectum, infratectum of small granules, indistinct or absent foot layer. Originally thought to come from angiosperms, then suggested to come from arbustive Bennettites. It was recently found to come from Eucommiitheca, a member of the enigmatic Erdtmanithecales, reinterpreted as an unusual gymnosperm grain with a single distal colpus flanked by two subsidiary lateral colps. Is very similar to the pollen of the extant Ephedra and Welwitschia (mainly on the basis of the granular structure of the exine).	

=== Cycadophyta ===
Genus	Species	Stratigraphic position	Material	Notes	Images
Butefia	B. ensiformis	Bagagraven clay pit	Leaflets	Affinities with Cycadales in the Cycadopsida. Originally described as Podozamites ensiformis.	
Chasmatosporites	C. apertus; C. elegans; C. hians; C. major; C. minor	Levka-1 borehole; Korsodde section	Pollen	Affinities with the family Zamiaceae in the Cycadales. It is among the most abundant flora recovered on the upper section of the coeval Rya Formation, and was found to be similar to the pollen of the extant Encephalartos laevifolius.	Extant Encephalartos laevifolius. Chasmatosporites may come from a related plant
Clavatipollenites	C. hughesii	Levka-1 borehole; Sorthat beds; Korsodde section	Pollen	Affinities with the family Cycadaceae in the Cycadales. The structure of the exine of Clavatipollenites hughesii from Jurassic deposits is fundamentally different from that of Cretaceous grains referred to the same species, confirming observations made previously on the basis of analysis under the light microscope and suggesting a possible derivation from cycadalean rather than angiospermous plants.	Extant Cycas platyphylla. Clavatipollenites may come from a related plant
Ctenis	C. nathorsti	Hasle clay pit	Leaflets	Affinities with Cycadales in the Cycadopsida.	Ctenis specimen from Sweden

=== Bennettitales ===
Genus	Species	Stratigraphic position	Material	Notes	Images
Cycadopites	C. nitidus; C. andrewsii	Korsodde section	Pollen	Affinities with the family Cycadaceae and Bennettitaceae. It has been found associated with the Bennetite pollen cone Bennettistemon. It increases towards the Toarcian section.	
Dictyozamites	D. johnsirupi	Bagagraven clay pit	Leaflets	Affinities with Williamsoniaceae in the Bennettitales.	
Nilssonia	N. polymorpha; N. münsteri; N. acuminata	Vellengsby; Bagagraven clay pit; Nebbeodde	Leaflets	Affinities with Cycadeoidaceae in the Bennettitales. The most common and abundant bennetite on the formation.	Nilssonia specimen from an unknown location
Nilssoniopteris	N. tenuinervis; N. glandulosa	Bagagraven clay pit; Hasle clay pit	Leaflets	Affinities with Cycadeoidaceae in the Bennettitales.	
Otozamites	O. bornholmiensis; O. latior; O. bartholini; O. tenuissimus; O. bunburyanus; O. obtusus; O. pusillus; O. beani; O. pterophylloides; O. molinianus; O. cf. reglei; O. cf. mimetes	Vellengsby; Bagagraven clay pit; Stina-1 well	Leaflets	Affinities with Williamsoniaceae in the Bennettitales. Insufficient and incomplete material prevents certain assignment of Otozamites cf. reglei and Otozamites cf. mimetes	Otozamites specimen from an unknown location
Pterophyllum	P. tenuicaule; P. carnallianum; P. cf. aequale; P. cf. braunianum	Vellengsby; Bagagraven clay pit	Leaflets	Affinities with Williamsoniaceae in the Bennettitales.	Pterophyllum specimen from Austria
Williamsonia	W. forchhammeri	Nebbeodde	Bennettitalean "flower"	Affinities with Williamsoniaceae in the Bennettitales.	Williamsonia "flower" fossil from England

=== Ginkgoales ===
Genus	Species	Stratigraphic position	Material	Notes	Images
Baiera	B. czekanowskiana; B. pulchella; B. sp.	Korsodde section; Bagagraven clay pit; Vellengsby	Leaf compressions; Cuticles	Affinities with Karkeniaceae in the Ginkgoales. Unlike other plant specimens from the location, it is more characteristic of Middle Jurassic flora.	Baiera specimen from an unknown location
Czekanowskia	C. hartzii; C. cf. setacea	Korsodde section; Hasle clay pit; Vellengsby	Leaf compressions; Cuticles	Affinities with Czekanowskiales in the Ginkgoales. This genus is related to flora from the Rhaetian–Hettangian boundary of Jameson Land, but also present in Romania.	
Hartzia	H. tenuis; H. sp.	Korsodde section	Leaf compressions; Cuticles	Affinities with Czekanowskiales in the Ginkgoales. Linked to the Lower Liassic flora of Greenland.	
Ginkgoites	G. troedssonii; G. sibirica; G. obovata	Korsodde section; Bagagraven clay pit; Hasle clay pit; Nebbeodde	Leaf compressions; Cuticles	Affinities with Ginkgoaceae in the Ginkgoales. Seven species assigned to either Ginkgo or Ginkgoites have been reported from Latest Triassic to middle Jurassic strata of southern Sweden.	Ginkgoites sibirica reconstruction
Monosulcites	M. minimus; M. punctatus	Levka-1 borehole; Sorthat beds; Korsodde section	Pollen	Affinities with the family Karkeniaceae and Ginkgoaceae in the Ginkgoales. Had been considered pollen of Chloranthaceae but is likely from Ginkgoales, which can have similar features	Extant Ginkgo, the only surviving member of the Ginkgoaceae. Monosulcites pollen is similar to the pollen of this extant species.
Solenites	S. murrayana	Korsodde section	Leaf compressions; Cuticles	Affinities with Czekanowskiales in the Ginkgoales. This species was described on the basis of individuals collected in Greenland from the Triassic–Jurassic boundary.	

=== Coniferophyta ===
Genus	Species	Stratigraphic position	Material	Notes	Images
Agathoxylon	A. württembergica	Bagagraven clay pit	Fossil Wood	Affinities with Hirmeriellaceae or Araucariaceae in the Pinales. Originally Araucarioxylon württembergica. This genus is usually associated with leaf-bearing twigs referred to as Pagiophyllum, abundant in the Sorthat Formation.	Agathoxylon
Araucariacites	A. australis	Levka-1 borehole; Sorthat beds; Korsodde section	Pollen	Affinities with Araucariaceae in the Pinales.	
Bartholinodendron	B. punctulatum	Bagagraven clay pit; Hasle clay pit	Fragmentary axis compressions with preserved leaves	Affinities with Taxaceae in the Pinales. Was first identified in Bornholm. Is similar to the cretaceous Taxus huolingolensis and extant Taxus in leaf gross morphology and has papillate abaxial cuticles, probably being close to this genus.	
Brachyphyllum	B. mamillare; B. sp.	Vellengsby; Korsodde section	Fragmentary axis compressions with preserved leaves; Coalified fragments; Cuticles	Affinities with Araucariaceae or Hirmeriellaceae in the Pinales. Is related to the Hettangian axis found in Scania, Sweden	Brachyphyllum specimen from an unknown location
Callialasporites	C. dampieri; C. turbatus; C. microvelatus; C. segmentatus	Sorthat beds; Korsodde section	Pollen	Affinities with the family Araucariaceae in the Pinales. Conifer pollen from medium to large arboreal plants.	Extant Araucaria. Callialasporites may come from a related plant
Cerebropollenites	C. macroverrucosus; C. thiergartii	Levka-1 borehole; Sorthat beds; Korsodde section	Pollen	Affinities with both Sciadopityaceae and Miroviaceae in the Pinopsida. This pollen's resemblance to extant Sciadopitys suggest that Miroviaceae may be an extinct lineage of Sciadopityaceae-like plants.	Extant Sciadopitys. Cerebropollenites likely come from a related plant
Corollina	C. torosus; C. meyeriana	Levka-1 borehole; Sorthat beds; Korsodde section	Pollen	Affinities with the Hirmeriellaceae in the Pinopsida.	
Cyparissidium	C. blackii	Korsodde section	Coalified fragments; Cuticles	Affinities with Cupressoideae in the Cupressales. It matches with the Middle Jurassic Cyparissidium blackii from Yorkshire, England.	
Dactylethrophyllum	D. ramonensis	Korsodde section	Coalified fragments; Cuticles	Affinities with Hirmeriellaceae in the Pinales. It is related to other representatives of the genus of the Toarcian of Italy and Lower Jurassic of Israel. Spheripollenites co-occurs with cuticles of Dactylethrophyllum ramonensis, and the species S. psilatus may be produced by the conifer genus Dactylethrophyllum.	
Elatocladus	E. subzamioides	Bagagraven clay pit	Fragmentary axis compressions with preserved leaves	Affinities with Thujaceae in the Cupressales. It was originally described as Taxites? subzamioides, later merged with Elatocladus.	Elatocladus specimen from Italy
Exesipollenites	E. tumulus	Korsodde section	Pollen	Affinities with the family Cupressaceae in the Pinopsida. Pollen that resembles that of extant genera such as the genus Actinostrobus and Austrocedrus, probably derived from dry environments.	Extant Austrocedrus. Exesipollenites and Perinopollenites maybe come from a related plant
Hirmeriella	H. münsteri	Bagagraven clay pit	Ovuliferous Cones	Affinities with Hirmeriellaceae in the Pinales. The main genus of the Hirmeriellaceae, found in dry environments and probably fire tolerant.	
Quadraeculina	Q. anellaeformis	Levka-1 borehole; Sorthat beds; Korsodde section	Pollen	Affinities originally suggested with the family Podocarpaceae in the Pinopsida. Quadraeculina is not comparable to pollen of any modern gymnosperm family.	
Lindleycladus	L. lanceolatus	Hasle clay pit; Bagagraven clay pit	Leaf compressions; Cuticles	Affinities with Krassiloviaceae in the Voltziales.	
Marskea	M. jurassica	Bagagraven clay pit	Fragmentary axis compressions with preserved leaves	Affinities with Taxaceae in the Pinales. Originally described as Taxus jurassica.	
Pagiophyllum	P. kurrii; P. peregrinum; P. johnstrupi; P. falcatum; P. sp.	Korsodde section; Bagagraven clay pit; Hasle clay pit	Fragmentary axis compressions with preserved leaves; Coalified fragments; Cuticles	Affinities with Araucariaceae or Hirmeriellaceae in the Pinales. P. kurrii (originally P. steenstrupi) is preferred as this species is characterised by relatively broad leaves inserted at high angles to the stem. P. peregrinum has been found on the Hettangian Rønne Formation associated with hirmeriellidaceous wood of Simplicioxylon. On the Toarcian levels, is the most common plant cuticle recovered locally.	Pagiophyllum specimen from an unknown location
Paleopicea	P. glaesaria	Korsodde section	Pollen	Affinities with the family Pinaceae in the Pinopsida. Conifer pollen from medium to large arboreal plants.	Extant Picea. Paleopicea and Pinuspollenites may come from a related plant
Palissya	P. sphenolepis; P. sternbergi	Vellengsby; Nebbeodde	Ovuliferous Cones	Affinities with Palissyaceae in the Palissyales. Descriptions of Palissya come mostly from coeval deposits in the Northern Hemisphere, based on a very few specimens from Sweden, Germany and America.	
Perinopollenites	P. elatoides	Levka-1 borehole; Sorthat beds; Korsodde section	Pollen	Affinities with the family Cupressaceae in the Pinopsida.	
Pinuspollenites	P. minimus; P. pinoides	Levka-1 borehole; Sorthat beds; Korsodde section	Pollen	Affinities with the family Pinaceae in the Pinopsida.	
Pityophyllum	P. angustifolium	Bagagraven clay pit; Hasle clay pit; Vellengsby	Leaf compressions; Cuticles	Affinities with Schizolepisaceae in the Pinaceae. This genus is found associated with Schizolepis on many places, making diverse authors to put both on Pinaceae.	
Pityocladus	P. longifolius	Bagagraven clay pit; Hasle clay pit; Vellengsby	Leaf compressions; Cuticles	Affinities with Schizolepisaceae in the Pinaceae.	
Podozamites	P. angustifolius; P. cuspiformis; P. agardhianus; P. schenkii; P. gramineus; P. sp.	Hasle clay pit; Bagagraven clay pit; Korsodde section; Vellengsby; Stina-1 well	Fragmentary axis compressions with preserved leaves; Coalified fragments; Cuticles	Affinities with Krassiloviaceae in the Voltziales. The local Podozamites show a great range of growth, reflecting tropical to subtropical conditions.	Podozamites reconstruction
Schizolepidopsis	S. follini	Vellengsby; Bagagraven clay pit	Ovulate strobili	Affinities with Schizolepisaceae in the Pinaceae. Placed in the Pinaceae on the basis of separated scales and bract scales.	
Sewardiodendron	S. steenstrupii	Bagagraven clay pit; Hasle clay pit	Fragmentary axis compressions with preserved leaves	Affinities with Cunninghamioideae in the Cupressales. Cunninghamia-like conifers belonging to half-evergreen trees.	
Simplicioxylon	S. rotnaensis	Bagagraven clay pit; Stina-1 well	Fossil Wood	Affinities with Hirmeriellaceae in the Pinales. Originally identified as Brachyoxylon rotnaensis, now thought to be a synonym of Simplicioxylon. Wood from these conifers is also found in the Hettangian–Sinemurian Rønne Formation and the Toarcian Úrkút Manganese Ore Formation.	
Spheripollenites	S. psilatus; S. subgranulatus; S. subscabratus	Korsodde section; Levka-1 borehole; Sorthat beds	Pollen	Affinities with the Hirmeriellaceae in the Pinopsida. Spheripollenites psilatus composes up to 95% of the Lower Toarcian section and is correlated with Toarcian carbon cycle anomalies including the oceanic anoxic event, suggesting dry climates.	
Stachyotaxus	S. septentrionalis	Hasle clay pit	Fragmentary axis compressions with preserved leaves	Affinities with Palissyaceae in the Palissyales.	Stachyotaxus specimens from Germany
Torreya	T. moelleri	Bagagraven clay pit	Fragmentary axis compressions with preserved leaves	Affinities with Taxaceae in the Pinales. Known only from Bornholm and belongs to an extant genus. This species is related to the Middle Jurassic floras of Yorkshire.	Extant Torreya specimen

=== Amber ===
Type	Location	Material	Notes
Amber	Sorthat beds	Amber fragments	B. Eske Koch corroborated the presence of amber drops in the Sorthat Formation. This record represents one of the few worldwide from Jurassic layers. This amber was quoted as derived from Coniferales indet.

=== Ichnofossils ===
Genus	Species	Location	Material	Origin	Images
Arenicolites	A. isp.	Levka section; Sorthat beds	Dwelling traces	Polychaetes (Spionida and Carpitellida); Suspension-feeding amphipodan crustaceans; Deposit-feeding Sipuncula	Arenicolites specimen from Mongolia
Bornichnus	B. tortuosus	Korsodde section	Tubular traces	Polychaetes	
Chondrites	C. isp.	Korsodde section	Tubular fodinichnia	Annelids (Polychaeta; Sipuncula	Illustration of Chondrites bollensis
Cylindrichnus	C. isp.	Korsodde section	Burrowing and track ichnofossils	Polychaetes	
Diplocraterion	D. parallelum	Levka section; Baga beds; Sorthat beds; Korsodde section	U-shaped burrows	Polychaeta annelids (Axiothella, Abarenicola and Scolecolepis); Sipunculans (Sipunculus); Enteropneustans (Balanoglossus); Echiurans (Urechis).	Diplocraterion parallelum diagram
Palaeophycus	P. isp.	Korsodde section	Cylindrical, predominantly horizontal to inclined burrows	Polychaetes; Semiaquatic insects (Orthoptera and Hemiptera); Semiaquatic and non-aquatic beetles.	Palaeophycus fossil from the United States
Planolites	P. isp.	Baga beds; Korsodde section	Cylindrical burrows	Polychaetes	Planolites fossil from Junget Beach, Salling, Denmark
Rosselia	R. erecta	Korsodde section	Trace fossil	Shrimp; Other aquatic arthropods	
Skolithos	S. isp. A; S. isp. B	Korsodde section	Cylindrical to subcylindrical burrows	Polychaetes; Phoronidans	Skolithos ichnofosil reconstruction, with possible fauna associated
Teichichnus	T. zigzag; T. isp.	Baga beds; Korsodde section	Dwelling traces	Polychaetes; Dwelling Echiurans; Dwelling Holothurians.	Teichichnus fossil from the United States
Thalassinoides	T. isp.	Korsodde section	Tubular fodinichnia	Thalassinidea; Several crustaceans (Anomura, Decapoda); Annelids (Polychaeta); Sipuncula; Dipnoi	Thalassinoides burrowing structures, with modern related fauna, showing the ecological convergence and the variety of animals that left this Ichnogenus.

== See also ==
- List of fossiliferous stratigraphic units in Denmark
- Blue Lias, England
- Charmouth Mudstone Formation, England
- Hasle Formation, Denmark
- Zagaje Formation, Poland
- Drzewica Formation, Poland
- Ciechocinek Formation, Poland
- Borucice Formation, Poland
- Rotzo Formation, Italy
- Saltrio Formation, Italy
- Moltrasio Formation, Italy
- Marne di Monte Serrone, Italy
- Calcare di Sogno, Italy
- Podpeč Limestone, Slovenia
- Coimbra Formation, Portugal
- El Pedregal Formation, Spain
- Fernie Formation, Canada
- Whiteaves Formation, British Columbia
- Navajo Sandstone, Utah
- Aganane Formation, Morocco
- Tafraout Group, Morocco
- Azilal Formation, Morocco
- Budoš Limestone, Montenegro
- Kota Formation, India
- Cañadón Asfalto Formation, Argentina
- Los Molles Formation, Argentina
- Kandreho Formation, Madagascar
- Elliot Formation, South Africa
- Clarens Formation, South Africa
- Evergreen Formation, Australia
- Cattamarra Coal Measures, Australia
- Hanson Formation, Antarctica
- Mawson Formation, Antarctica
