= Liparoceras pseudostriatum =

Liparoceras pseudostriatum Temporal range: Pliensbachian

Scientific classification
- Kingdom: Animalia
- Phylum: Mollusca
- Class: Cephalopoda
- Subclass: †Ammonoidea
- Order: †Ammonitida
- Family: †Liparoceratidae
- Genus: †Liparoceras
- Species: †L. pseudostriatum

Binomial name
- †Liparoceras pseudostriatum Trueman, 1919

Extinct species of ammonite

Liparoceras pseudostriatum is an extinct fossil ammonite species from the Pliensbachian period of the Jurassic. Liparoceras means 'fat head' and this is due to its broad shell. The venter is wide and finely ribbed with no keel and it has two rows of tubercules on each whorl.

== Distribution ==
Jurassic deposits in France the United Kingdom
