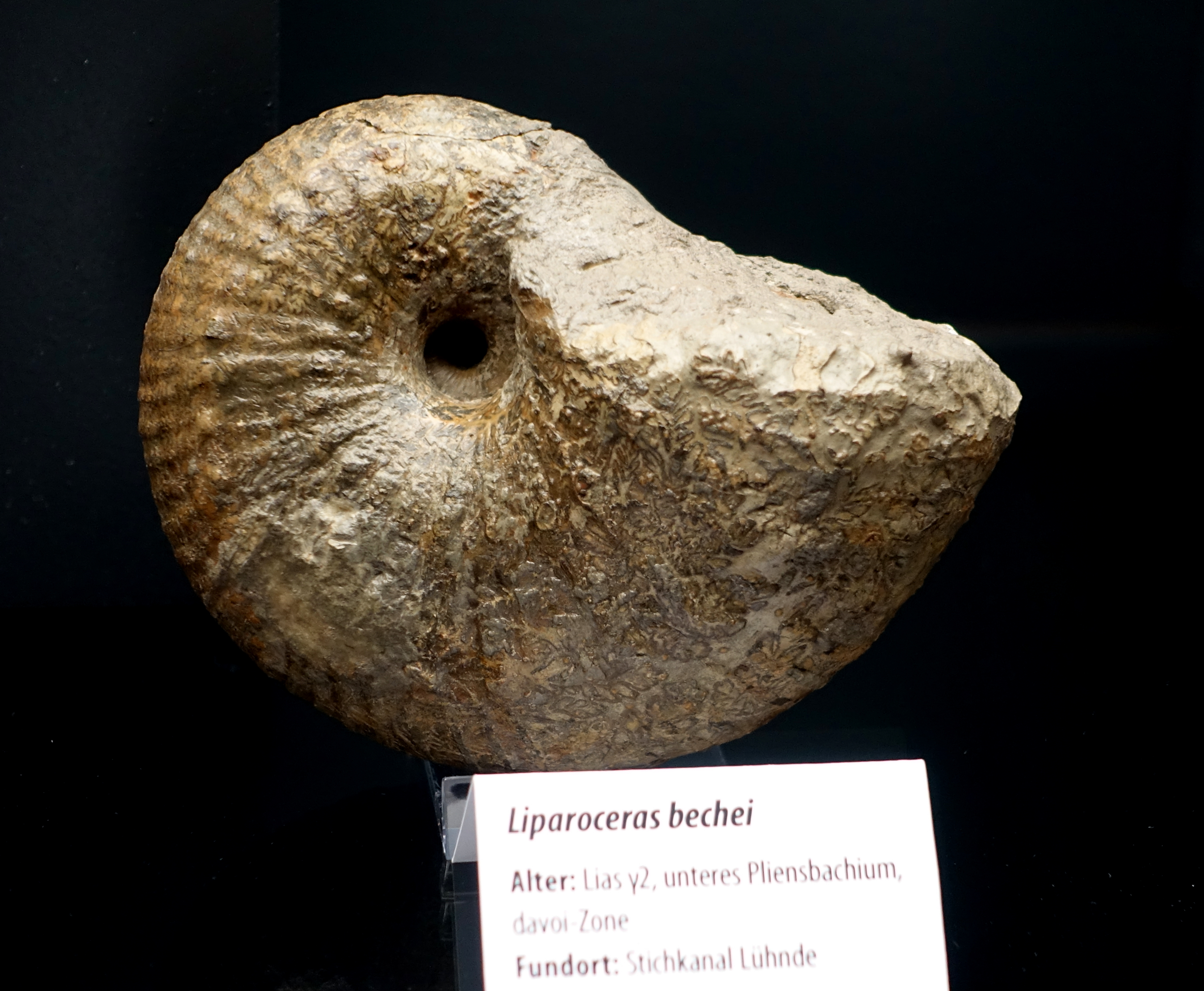
- Liparoceras bechei fossil

Scientific classification
- Kingdom: Animalia
- Phylum: Mollusca
- Class: Cephalopoda
- Subclass: †Ammonoidea
- Order: †Ammonitida
- Family: †Liparoceratidae
- Genus: †Liparoceras; Hyatt, 1867

Species
- L. divaricosta Trueman 1919; L. elegans Spath 1938; L. kilsbiense Spath 1938; L. pseudostriatum Trueman 1919; L. rusticum Spath 1938; L. tiara Trueman 1919

= Liparoceras =

Liparoceras Temporal range: Pliensbachian

Genus of molluscs (fossil)

Liparoceras is an extinct fossil ammonite genus from the Early Jurassic period of England, and is found in lower Lias deposits. Its name means 'fat head' and this is due to its broad shell. The venter is wide and finely ribbed with no keel and it has two rows of tubercules on each whorl.

== Distribution ==
Jurassic deposits of Argentina, Europe, British Columbia and North Africa.
