= Aegoceras (Beaniceras) =

Aegoceras (Beaniceras) Temporal range: Pliensbachian

Scientific classification
- Kingdom: Animalia
- Phylum: Mollusca
- Class: Cephalopoda
- Subclass: †Ammonoidea
- Order: †Ammonitida
- Family: †Liparoceratidae
- Genus: †Aegoceras
- Subgenus: †Beaniceras

Species
- A. (B.) centaurus (Quenstedt); A. (B.) costatum; A. (B.) cottardiense; A. (B.) crassum; A. (B.) larzacensis; A. (B.) luridum; A. (B.) rotundum; A. (B.) senile

Genus of molluscs (fossil)

Beaniceras is small, coarsely ribbed subgenus of ammonites from the Lower Jurassic with coarsely ribbed rounded whorls. The shell is evolute, early whorls a barrel-shaped cadicone, later become serpenticonic.

== Distribution ==
Jurassic of France, Germany and Spain
