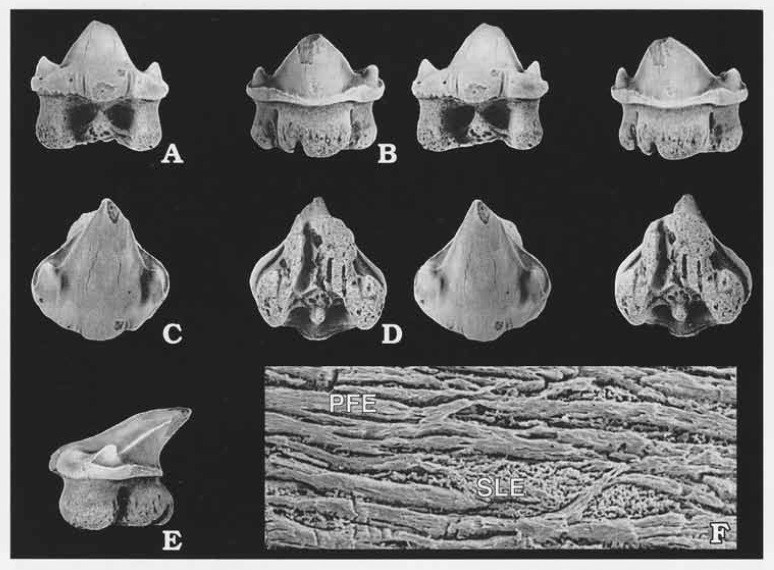

Scientific classification
- Kingdom: Animalia
- Phylum: Chordata
- Class: Chondrichthyes
- Subclass: Elasmobranchii
- Division: Selachii
- Superorder: Galeomorphi
- Family: †Agaleidae
- Genus: †Agaleus; Duffin & Ward, 1983
- Species: †A. dorsetensis

Binomial name
- †Agaleus dorsetensis Duffin & Ward, 1983

= Agaleus =

Agaleus Temporal range: Hettangian–Pliensbachian

Extinct genus of sharks

Agaleus is an extinct genus of stem-galeomorph shark from the Early Jurassic Epoch. The genus Agaleus is monotypic, consisting solely of the species Agaleus dorsetensis. This species is currently only known from isolated teeth. It is the oldest known unambiguous crown group shark.

== Taxonomy ==
Some authorities have placed this species as a basal member of the order Orectolobiformes, but subsequent researchers have found it to be a stem-galeomorph just outside the crown group of Orectolobiformes.

== Distribution ==
It is known from the Hettangian-Sinemurian of Lyme Regis, England and the Pliensbachian-aged Hasle Formation of Denmark and Grimmen clay pit of north-eastern Germany. Other places which have produced this species include Northern Ireland, France, Belgium, and Sweden. Possible later occurrences of this genus in north-western Europe have been documented but not yet formally attributed to the genus.
