= Goniodromites =

Scientific classification
- Domain: Eukaryota
- Kingdom: Animalia
- Phylum: Arthropoda
- Class: Malacostraca
- Order: Decapoda
- Suborder: Pleocyemata
- Infraorder: Brachyura
- Family: †Goniodromitidae
- Genus: †Goniodromites; Reuss, 1858

Extinct genus of crabs

Goniodromites is an extinct genus of crabs. A new species, G. kubai, which existed during the Oxfordian stage of what is now Poland, was described by Natalia Starzyk, Ewa Krzemiska and Wiesław Krzemiski in 2012.

== Species ==
- Goniodromites aliquantulus Schweitzer et al., 2007
- Goniodromites bidentatus Reuss, 1858
- Goniodromites cenomanensis Wright & Collins, 1972
- Goniodromites complanatus Reuss, 1858
- Goniodromites dacica Von Mucke, 1915
- Goniodromites dentatus Lorenthey & Beurlen, 1929
- Goniodromites hirotai Karasawa & Kato, 2007
- Goniodromites laevis Van Straelen, 1940
- Goniodromites narinosus Frantescu, 2010
- Goniodromites polyodon Reuss, 1858
- Goniodromites sakawense Karasawa & Kato, 2007
- Goniodromites serratus Beurlen, 1929
- Goniodromites transsylvanicus Lorenthey, 1929
- Goniodromites kubai Starzyk, Krzemiska & Krzemiski, 2012
