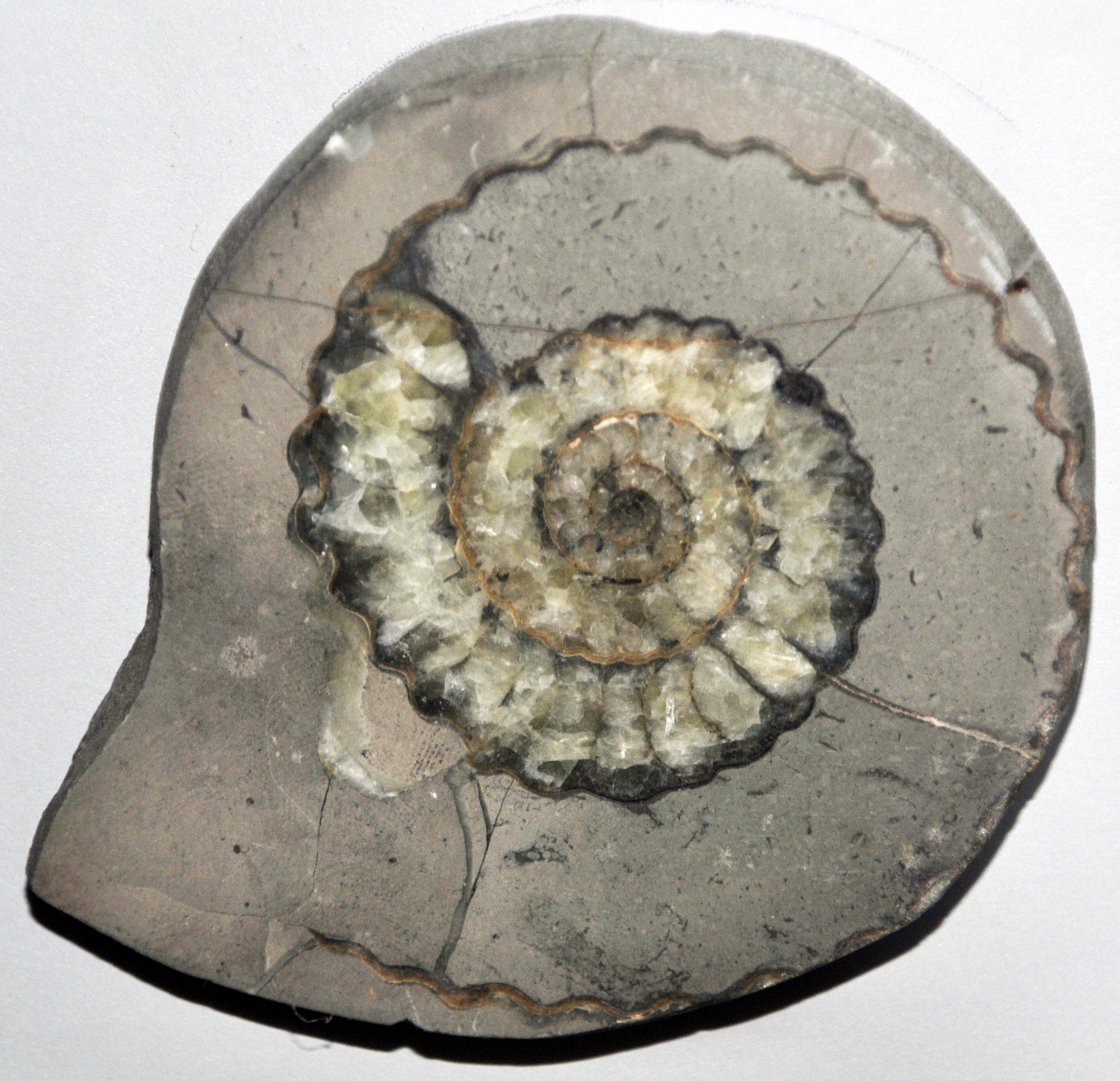
- Aegoceras lataecosta

Scientific classification
- Kingdom: Animalia
- Phylum: Mollusca
- Class: Cephalopoda
- Subclass: †Ammonoidea
- Order: †Ammonitida
- Family: †Liparoceratidae
- Genus: †Aegoceras; Howarth, 2013

Subgenera
- Aegoceras (Aegoceras); Aegoceras (Beaniceras); Aegoceras (Oistoceras)

= Aegoceras =

Aegoceras Temporal range: Sinemurian

Genus of molluscs (fossil)

Aegoceras is an evolutionary wound ammonite, with wide spaced ribs, from the Early Jurassic (England) included in the Liparoceratidae and superfamily Eoderoceratidae. Leparoceras is a related genus.
