= Rønne Formation =

Geologic formation on the island on Bornholm, Denmark

- Stratigraphic range: Mid Hettangian-Early Pliensbachian; ~200–190 Ma
- Outcrop of the Galgeløkke Member
- Sub-units: Galgeløkke, Sose Bugt & Munkerup Members
- Underlies: Hasle Formation
- Overlies: Kägeröd Formation
- Thickness: 50 m (160 ft)

Lithology
- Primary: Siltstone, sandstone

Location
- Coordinates: 55.2°N 15.0°E
- Approximate paleocoordinates: 45.2°N 13.8°E
- Region: Bornholm
- Country: Denmark
- Rønne Formation (Denmark)

The Rønne Formation is a geologic formation on the island on Bornholm, Denmark. It is of middle Hettangian to early Pliensbachian age. Vertebrate fossils have been uncovered from this formation. During the Early Jurassic, on what is now the Bornholm region was transitional between continental and marine settings with tidal influence. There was a lower delta plain, with lagoons and intertidal swamps. The formation is correlated with the lower Rya Formation and the upper Höganäs Formation of Skåne, Sweden.

== Fossil content ==
The Rønne Formation has provided many fossil flora.

=== Ichnofossils ===
Genus	Species	Material	Notes	Images
Neotheropoda	Indeterminate		Footprints.	

== See also ==
- List of fossiliferous stratigraphic units in Denmark
