= Phricodoceras =

Phricodoceras Temporal range: Pliensbachian

Scientific classification
- Kingdom: Animalia
- Phylum: Mollusca
- Class: Cephalopoda
- Subclass: Ammonoidea
- Order: Ammonitida
- Genus: Phricodoceras Hyatt, 1900

Species
- Phricodoceras bettonii; Phricodoceras cantaluppii; Phricodoceras paronai; Phricodoceras taylori; Phricodoceras urkuticum

Genus of molluscs (fossil)

Phricodoceras is an extinct genus of cephalopod belonging to the ammonite subclass.

== Distribution ==
Austria, Canada, Hungary, Morocco, Turkey and the United Kingdom.
