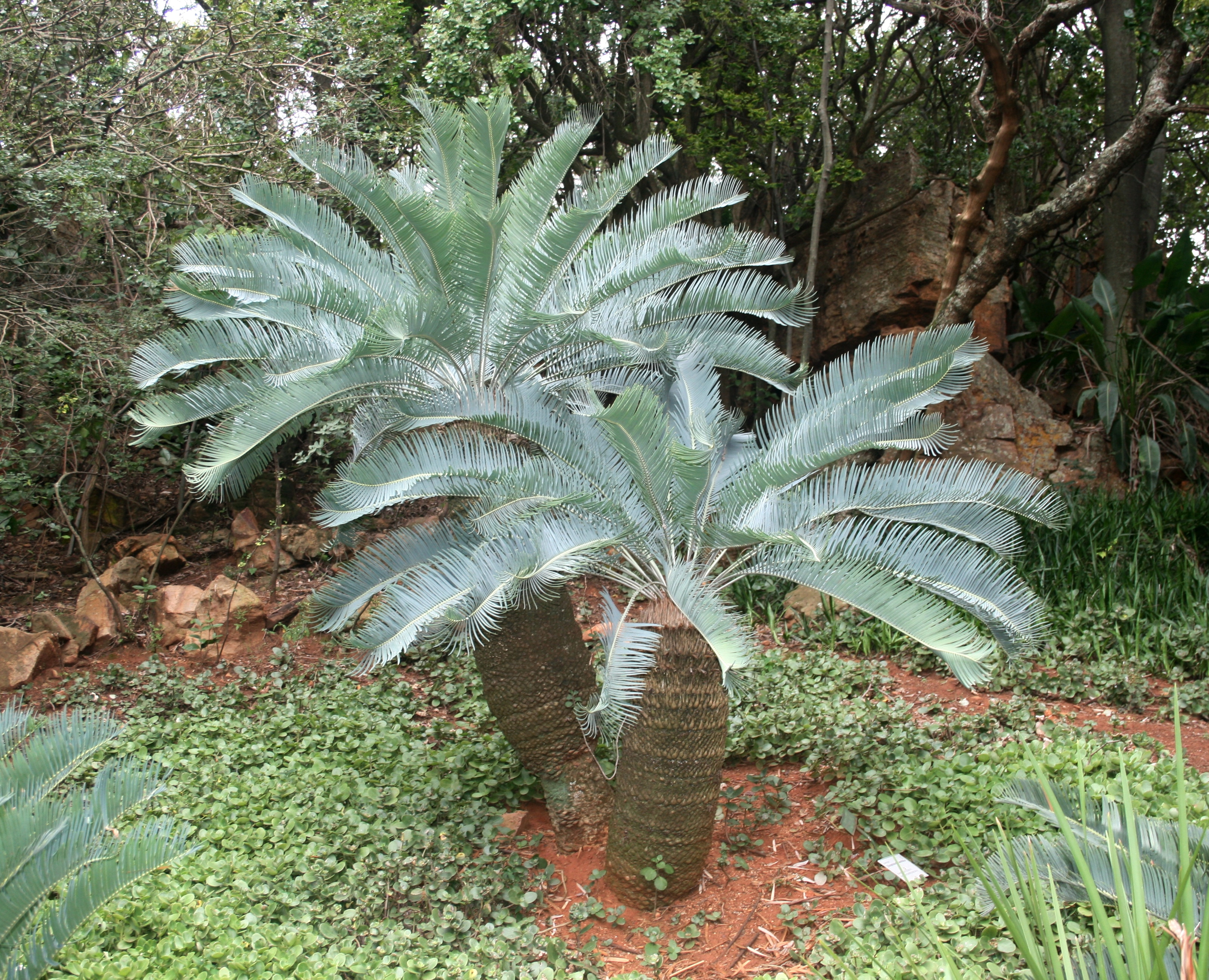
- Specimens from Kaapsehoop in the Pretoria National Botanical Garden

Conservation status
- Critically Endangered (IUCN 3.1)
- CITES Appendix I

Scientific classification
- Kingdom: Plantae
- Clade: Tracheophytes
- Clade: Gymnospermae
- Division: Cycadophyta
- Class: Cycadopsida
- Order: Cycadales
- Family: Zamiaceae
- Genus: Encephalartos
- Species: E. laevifolius

Binomial name
- Encephalartos laevifolius Stapf & Burtt Davy

= Encephalartos laevifolius =

Kaapsehoop cycad

Species of cycad

Encephalartos laevifolius is a species of cycad that is found in the KwaZulu-Natal, Mpumalanga and Limpopo provinces of South Africa, and at Piggs Peak in Eswatini. The species is facing extinction in the wild, but is widely cultivated. As of 2012, the Encephalartos laevifolius has been listed as critically endangered by the IUCN.

== Description ==
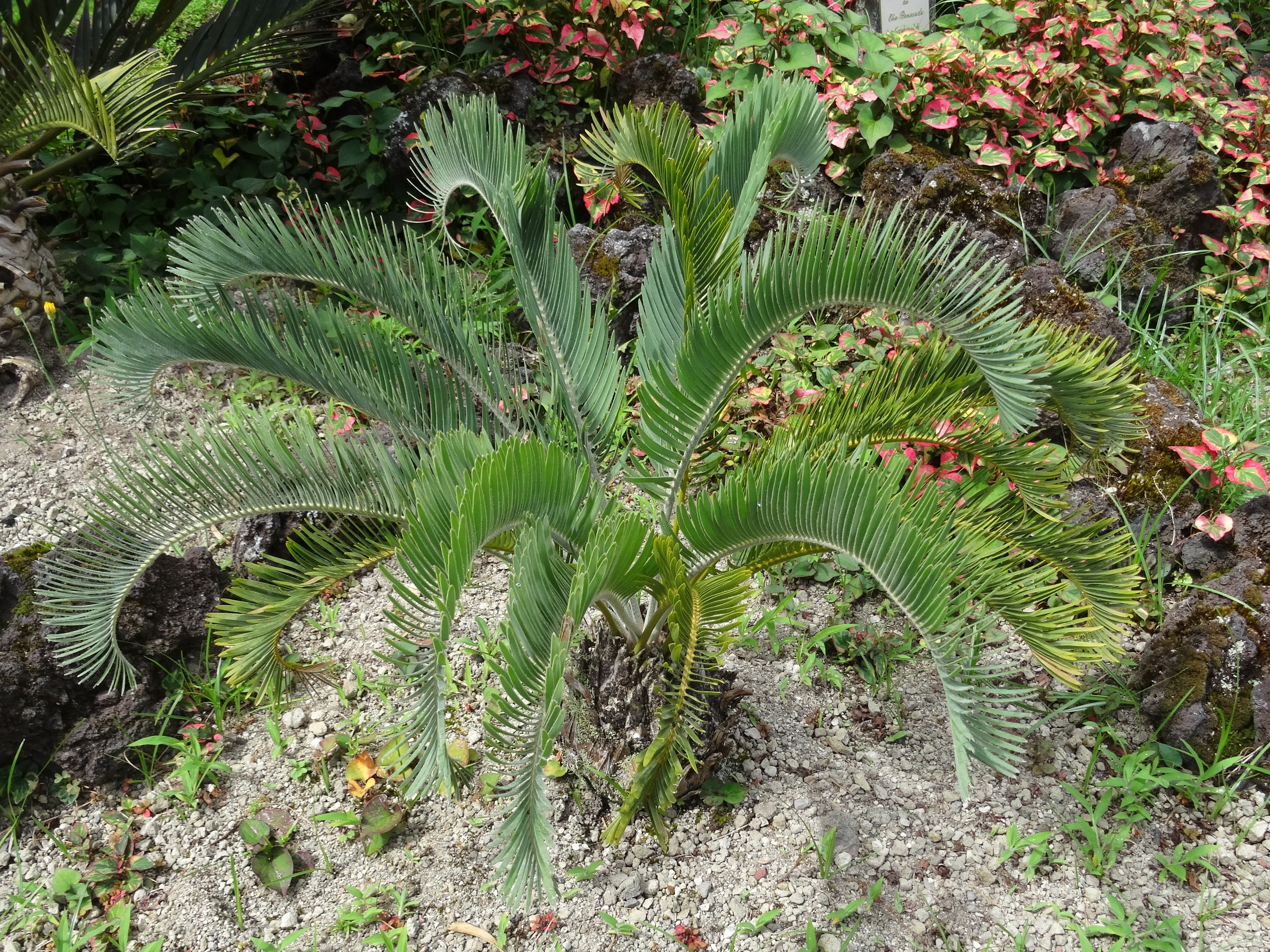
Young specimen in the Terra Nostra Garden, Azores

This cycad is tree-like, growing up to 3.5 meters tall with a stem diameter of 25-35 cm. It sometimes develops additional stems from suckers at its base. Its pinnate leaves can reach 1 meter in length, supported by a 22-25 cm long petiole. Each leaf is made up of many pairs of lanceolate, leathery leaflets that are 12-15 cm long, with smooth edges and a sharp tip. This species is dioecious, with male plants bearing 1 to 5 cylindrical-fusiform cones, 30-40 cm long and 9-10 cm wide, in yellow to brown hues. Female plants produce 1-5 cylindrical cones, 20-30 cm long and 10-15 cm wide, in a light yellow color. The seeds are roughly oval-shaped, 2.5-3.5 cm long, and covered with a yellow-orange sarcotesta.
