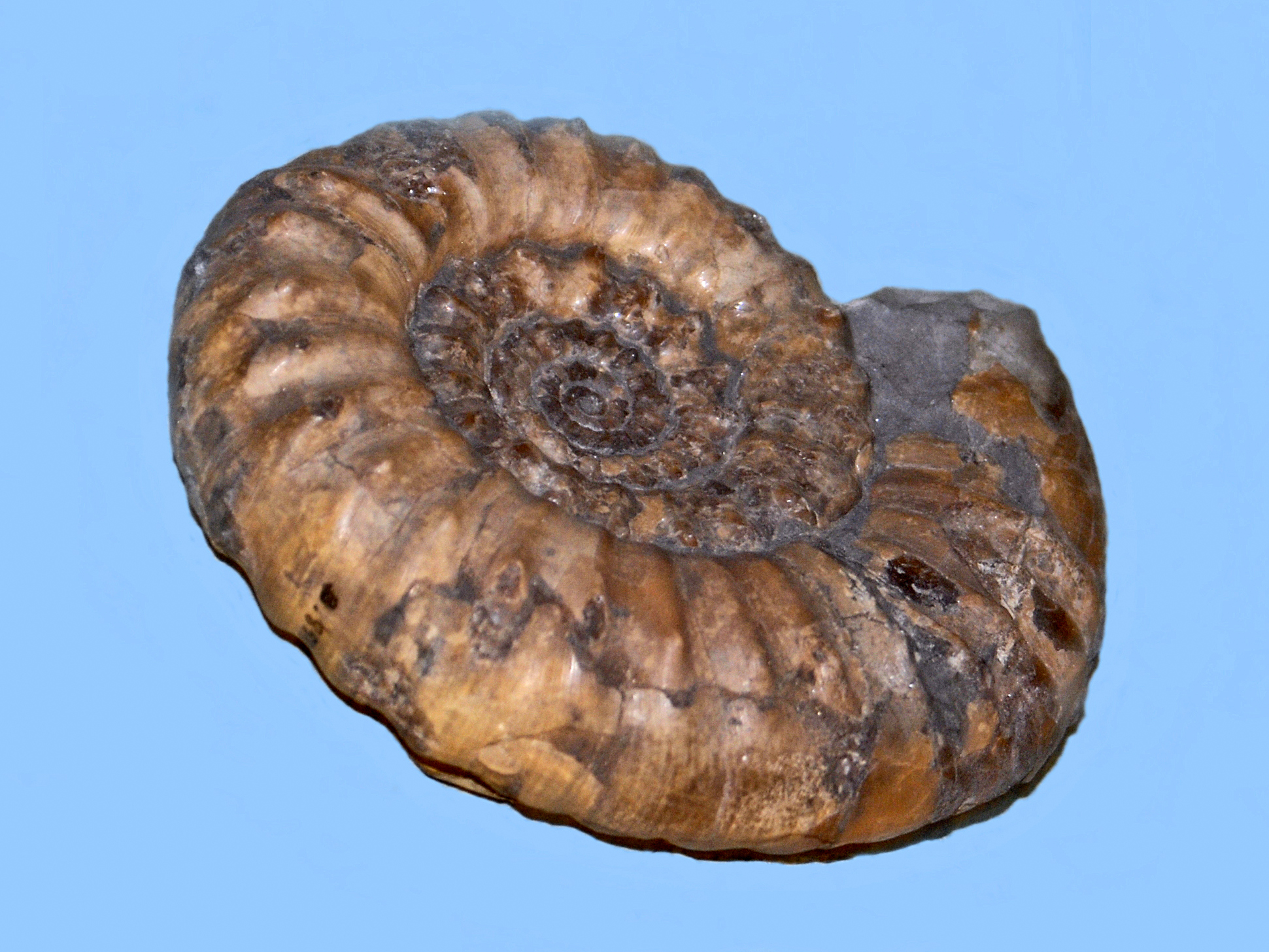
- Fossil shells of Androgynoceras species from Lyme Regis (England), on display at Galerie de paléontologie et d'anatomie comparée in Paris

Scientific classification
- Kingdom: Animalia
- Phylum: Mollusca
- Class: Cephalopoda
- Subclass: †Ammonoidea
- Order: †Ammonitida
- Superfamily: †Eoderoceratoidea
- Family: †Liparoceratidae; Hyatt, 1867

Genera
- See text

= Liparoceratidae =

Liparoceratidae Temporal range: Pliensbachian

Extinct family of ammonites

Liparoceratidae is a family of eoderoceratoidean ammonites from the Lower Jurassic that combines genera with a variety of forms including dimorphs that change from one form to another during ontogeny.

Three genera and six subgenera are included in the Liparoceridae according to D.T. Donovan in Donovan et al. 1981; Liparoceras including L. (Liparoceras), L. (Becheiceras), and L. (Vicininodiceras); Aegoceras including A. (Aegoceras), A. (Beaniceras), and A. (Oistoceras); and Androgynoceras. Arkell, et al. (1957) in the Treatise on Invertebrate Paleontology, Part L list Liparoceras with Becheiceras and Vincininodiceras along with Parinodiceras separately as subgenera; Beaniceras, Metacymbites, Oistoceras, and Platynoticeras but leave out Aegoceras. Parinodiceras and its equivalent, Platynoticeras are removed (Donovan 1981) to the Polymorphitidae. Metacymbites is a smooth dwarf and may form a dimorphic pair with Liparoceras.

The Liparoceratidae are thought to have evolved from the Eoderoceratidae along with the Coeloceratidae and Polymorphidae close to the same time during the Sinemurian stage of the Early Jurassic, and in the following Pliensbachian gave rise to the Amaltheidae.
