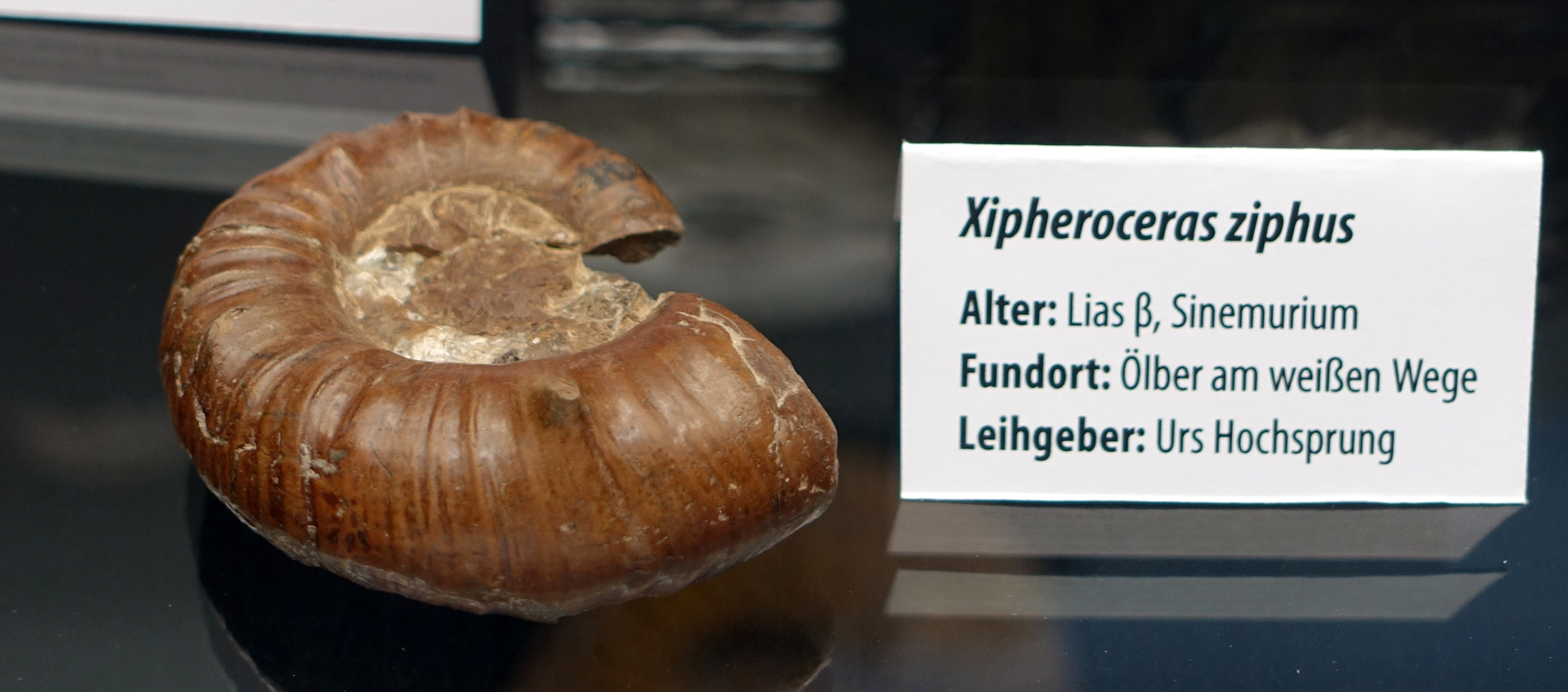
- Xipheroceras ziphus

Scientific classification
- Kingdom: Animalia
- Phylum: Mollusca
- Class: Cephalopoda
- Subclass: †Ammonoidea
- Order: †Ammonitida
- Superfamily: †Eoderoceratoidea
- Family: †Eoderoceratidae; Spath, 1929

Genera
- See text

= Eoderoceratidae =

Eoderoceratidae Temporal range: L Jurassic (Sine-L Pleins)

Extinct family of ammonites

Eoderoceratidae is the ancestral and most primitive family of the Eoderoceratoidea; lower Jurassic ammonite cephalopods, characterized by evolute, commonly serpenticonic, shells that had long body chambers and would have had no stable floating position; and thus resemble contemporary Psiloceratoidea. Spines, or tubercles, are typically found in two rows on the inner and outer parts of the whorl sides, joined by radial ribs. These are often more developed on the inner and middle whorls, becoming less so or absent on the outer. Sutures are highly complex.

The Eoderoceratidae can be divided into two subfamilies, the Xiphoceratinae which is the earliest and in which there is an early maximum development of spines of the inner whorls, and the Eoderoceratinae. Two other subfamilies were included in the Treatise 1957 but are now regarded as families in their own right, These are the Phricodoceratidae and Coeloceratidae

Genera that have been attributed to the Xiphoceratinae are Bifericeras, Microderoceras, and Xipheroceras. Those attributable to the Eoderoceratinae include Crucilobiceras, Eoderoceras, Neomicroderoceras, and Promicroceras All can be regarded simply as eoderoceratids.
