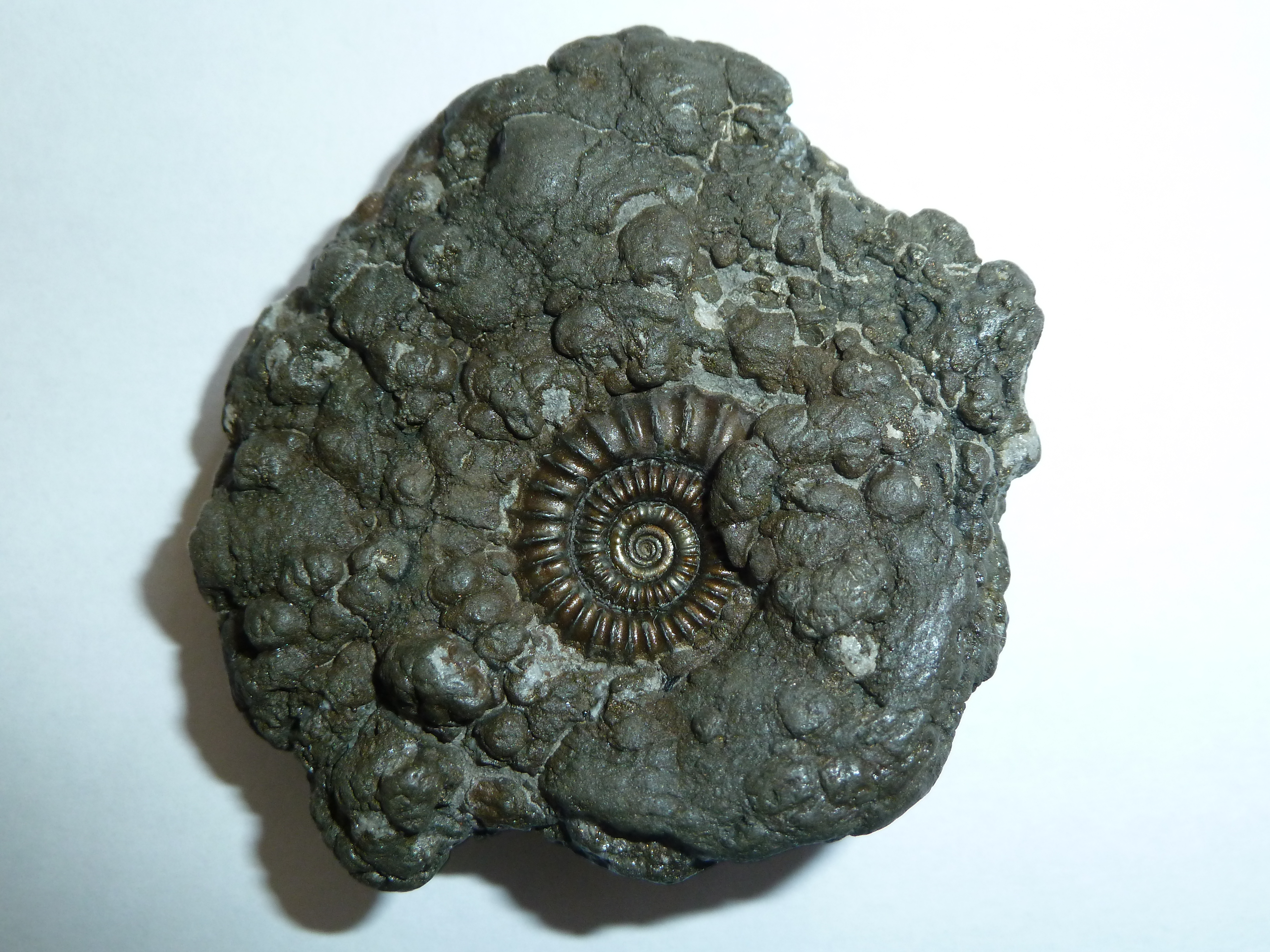
- Promicroceras pyritosum

Scientific classification
- Kingdom: Animalia
- Phylum: Mollusca
- Class: Cephalopoda
- Subclass: †Ammonoidea
- Order: †Ammonitida
- Family: †Eoderoceratidae
- Subfamily: †Eoderoceratinae
- Genus: †Promicroceras; Spath, 1925

Species
- P. capricornoides; P. cowapi; P. marstonense; P. planicosta; P. precompressum; P. pyritosum

= Promicroceras =

Promicroceras Temporal range: Sinemurian

Extinct genus of molluscs

Promicroceras is an extinct ammonite genus from the upper Sinemurian (Lower Jurassic) of Europe, named by Leonard Spath in 1925. Promicroceras is included in the family Eoderoceratidae, which is part of the ammonitid superfamily Eoderoceratoidea.

Shells are evolute with an open umbilicus; strongly ribbed, ribs flattened on the venter, and with small spines without distinct tubercles.

== Distribution ==
Promicroceras species are commonly found in South West England, particularly along the Dorset coast.

Pyritic Promicroceras fossils are commonly found along the coast of Lyme Regis and Charmouth where they are well preserved in the Lower Jurassic (Sinemurian) Black Ven Marl. Fossil shops in the area commonly sell cleaned and polished Promicroceras.
