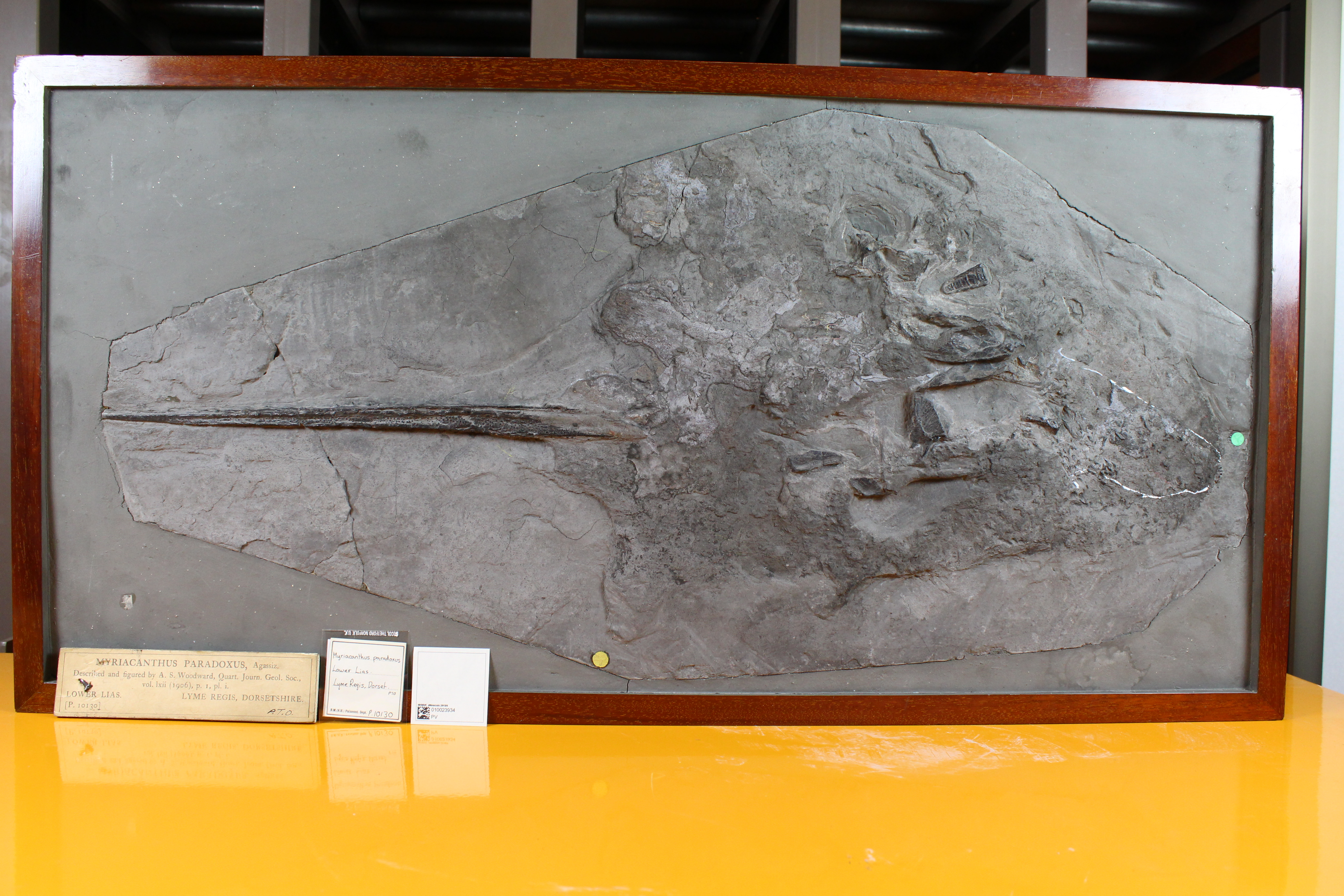
- The skull and dorsal fin spine of M. paradoxus, in the collection of the Natural History Museum, London

Scientific classification
- Kingdom: Animalia
- Phylum: Chordata
- Class: Chondrichthyes
- Subclass: Holocephali
- Order: Chimaeriformes
- Family: †Myriacanthidae
- Genus: †Myriacanthus; Agassiz, 1836
- Species: †M. paradoxus

Binomial name
- †Myriacanthus paradoxus Agassiz, 1836

Synonyms
- Prognathodus guentheri Egerton, 1872

= Myriacanthus =

Myriacanthus Temporal range: Late Triassic to Early Jurassic, Rhaetian–Pliensbachian

Extinct genus of cartilaginous fish

Myriacanthus is an extinct genus of cartilaginous fish belonging to the order Chimaeriformes. The only named species, Myriacanthus paradoxus, is known from the Early Jurassic of England, France, Belgium, and Denmark, and the Late Triassic of England. Myriacanthus had armor plates on its head and a long fin spine on its dorsal fin.

== Discovery and naming ==
The genus was first named by Louis Agassiz in 1836 for a fin spine discovered from Jurassic period rocks of Lyme Regis, Dorset. This specimen had previously been identified in 1822 by Henry De la Beche. More fossils, including those of the tooth plates and skull, have subsequently been identified from the Rhaetian of England, the Simurlengian of England, France and Belgium, and the Pliensbachian of Denmark. All of these remains are assigned to the type species M. paradoxus.

Other species of the genus such as M. bollensis, M. granulatus, and M. franconius are now classified as the genera Metopacanthus and Chimaeropsis.

== Description ==
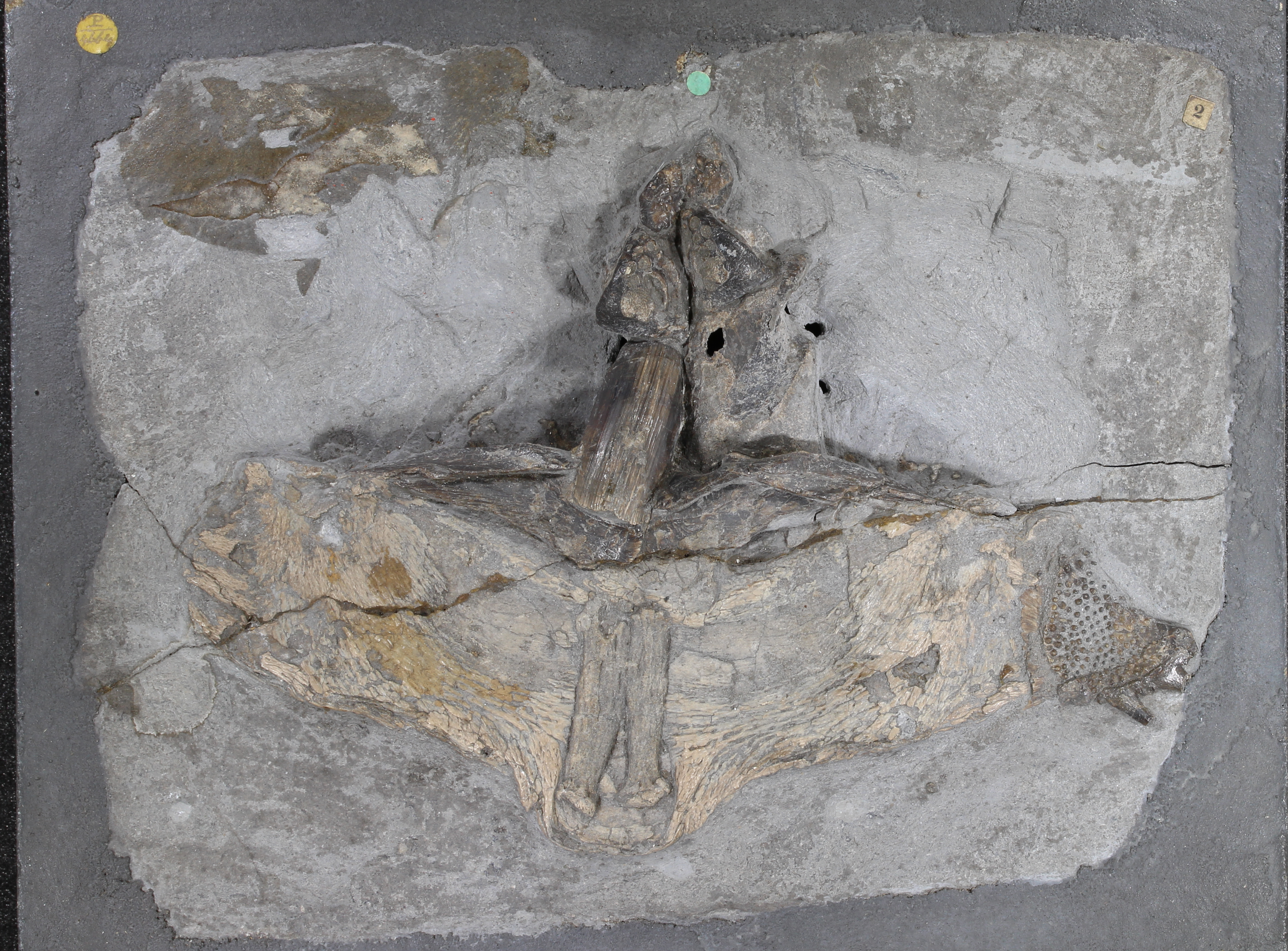
Jaw, teeth and armor of M. paradoxus

Myriacanthus had an elongated rostrum and a head that was armor plated. This armor included spines that extended backwards from the corners of the jaw. Behind the head was a fused block of cartilage termed a synarcual which supported a dorsal fin and fin spine, and a series of rings which formed the spinal column. The anatomy of the genus is otherwise poorly understood, as the known fossils are badly crushed. Based on the size of the head and neck region, the total length was likely over 1 meter (3.3 ft) long.

Myriacanthus had nine tooth plates: three pairs in the upper jaw, one pair at the rear of the lower jaw, and a single unpaired plate at the tip of the lower jaw.

== Classification ==
Myriacanthus is a member of the family Myriacanthidae and the order Chimaeriformes. It is the type genus of its family.

== See also ==
- List of prehistoric cartilaginous fish
