= Eoderoceras =

Eoderoceras Temporal range: Sinemurian

Scientific classification
- Domain: Eukaryota
- Kingdom: Animalia
- Phylum: Mollusca
- Class: Cephalopoda
- Subclass: †Ammonoidea
- Order: †Ammonitida
- Family: †Eoderoceratidae
- Subfamily: †Eoderoceratinae
- Genus: †Eoderoceras; Spath, 1925

Extinct genus of ammonites

Eoderoceras is an evolute, round whorled ammonite from the Lower Jurassic with an outer row of distinct spines, and in some, an inner row of tubercles, on either side; ribs only on the inner whorls.

Eoderoceras, named by Leonard Spath in 1925, is the type genus for the family Eoderoceratidae to which it belongs, which is part of the ammonitid superfamily Eoderoceratoidea, ammonoid cephalopods distinct from the more conservative but more successful Nautiloidea still around today.
