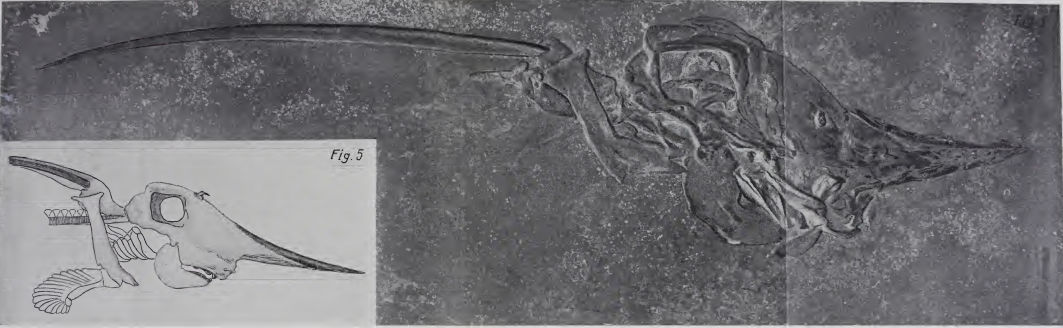
- Fossil of Acanthorhina
- Life restoration of a male Metopacanthus

Scientific classification
- Kingdom: Animalia
- Phylum: Chordata
- Class: Chondrichthyes
- Subclass: Holocephali
- Order: Chimaeriformes
- Family: †Myriacanthidae; Woodward 1889

Genera
- See text

= Myriacanthidae =

Myriacanthidae Temporal range: Latest Triassic-Early Jurassic Rhaetian–Toarcian

Extinct family of chimaeriform fish

Myriacanthidae is an extinct family of holocephalan cartilaginous fish, closely related to living chimaeras. Fossils are known from the latest Triassic (Rhaetian) and Early Jurassic of Europe.

== Description ==
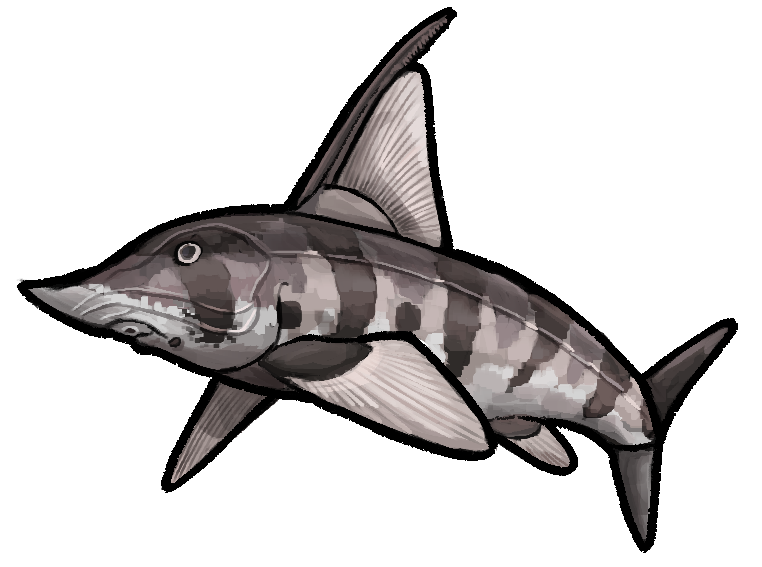
Life restoration of female Acanthorhina

Like other cartilaginous fish, most myriacanthids are only known from their teeth (and in a few cases their fin spines), though a handful of species are known from partial skeletons which preserve the cartilage.

Members of Myriacanthidae generally have elongate rostra with long frontal claspers. On the lower jaw, there is a dermal plate, and parts of the head are covered in dermal plates in some genera. There are three pairs of tooth plates in the upper jaw, of which the pair furthest back in the mouth are the largest. Like other members of Myriacanthoidei, they have dorsal fins supported by fin spines which are ornamented with tubercles. The synarcual is articulated with a basal cartilage. The notochord is surrounded by calcified rings (or alternatively paired half rings). Their bodies were covered in placoid scales, with the sensory lines being surrounded by c-shaped scales. The lower jaw has one pair of large tooth plates, as well as a chisel-shaped tooth at the mandibular symphysis at the front of the jaw.^{112}

The teeth of myriacanthids primary had a crushing function but also served to a lesser extent to cut food achieved via the presence of ridges on the teeth. Like living chimaeras, myriacanthids probably consumed a variety of invertebrate prey.

== Taxonomy ==
Myriacanthidae has been placed as close relatives of modern chimaeras (which comprise the clade Chimaeroidei) as part of the Chimaeriformes within the broader clade Holocephali.^{46} Traditionally, Myriacanthidae has been considered one of two families within the clade Myriacanthoidei, alongside the monotypic family Chimaeropsidae (which only contains Chimaeropsis, which lacks the distinctive rostrum that characterises typical myriacanthids),^{46,112,124} though some studies have placed this genus within Myriacanthidae as traditionally defined. Some studies have recovered a close relationship between myriacanthoids and the unusual, flattened chimaeriform Squaloraja, also known from the Jurassic of Europe, though this relationship has not been accepted by others.^{46}

Myriacanthids as traditionally defined span from the end of the Triassic (Rhaetian) to the end of the Early Jurassic (Toarcian).

†Family Myriacanthidae Woodward 1889

- †Acanthorhina Fraas 1910 Posidonia Shale Formation, Germany, Early Jurassic (Toarcian)
- †Agkistracanthus Duffin and Furrer 1981 Austria, England and Switzerland, Late Triassic–Early Jurassic (Rhaetian–Sinemurian)
- †Alethodontus Duffin 1983 Germany, Early Jurassic (Sinemurian)
- †Chimaeropsis? Zittel 1887 Belgium, Early Jurassic (Sinemurian), Germany, Late Jurassic (Kimmeridgian-Tithonian)
- †Halonodon Duffin 1984 Belgium and Luxembourg, Early Jurassic (Sinemurian)
- †Metopacanthus Zittel 1887 Posidonia Shale Formation, Germany, Early Jurassic (Toarcian)
- †Oblidens Duffin and Milàn 2017 Hasle Formation, Denmark, Early Jurassic (Pliensbachian)
- †Myriacanthus Agassiz 1837 United Kingdom, Late Triassic-Early Jurassic (Rhaetian–Sinemurian)
- †Recurvacanthus Duffin 1981 United Kingdom, Early Jurassic (Sinemurian)
- †Squaloraja? Riley 1833 Belgium, England and Italy, Early Jurassic (Hettangian–Sinemurian)
