= Gonioloboceratoidea =

Scientific classification
- Domain: Eukaryota
- Kingdom: Animalia
- Phylum: Mollusca
- Class: Cephalopoda
- Subclass: †Ammonoidea
- Order: †Goniatitida
- Suborder: †Goniatitina
- Superfamily: †Gonioloboceratoidea; Spath 1934

Families
- Gonioglyphioceratidae; Gonioloboceratidae; Wiedeyoceratidae

Synonyms
- Goniolobocerataceae

Extinct superfamily of molluscs

Gonioloboceratoidea is one of seventeen superfamilies of the Goniatitina suborder. They are an extinct group of ammonoid, which are shelled cephalopods related to squids, belemnites, octopodes, and cuttlefish, and more distantly to the nautiloids.
