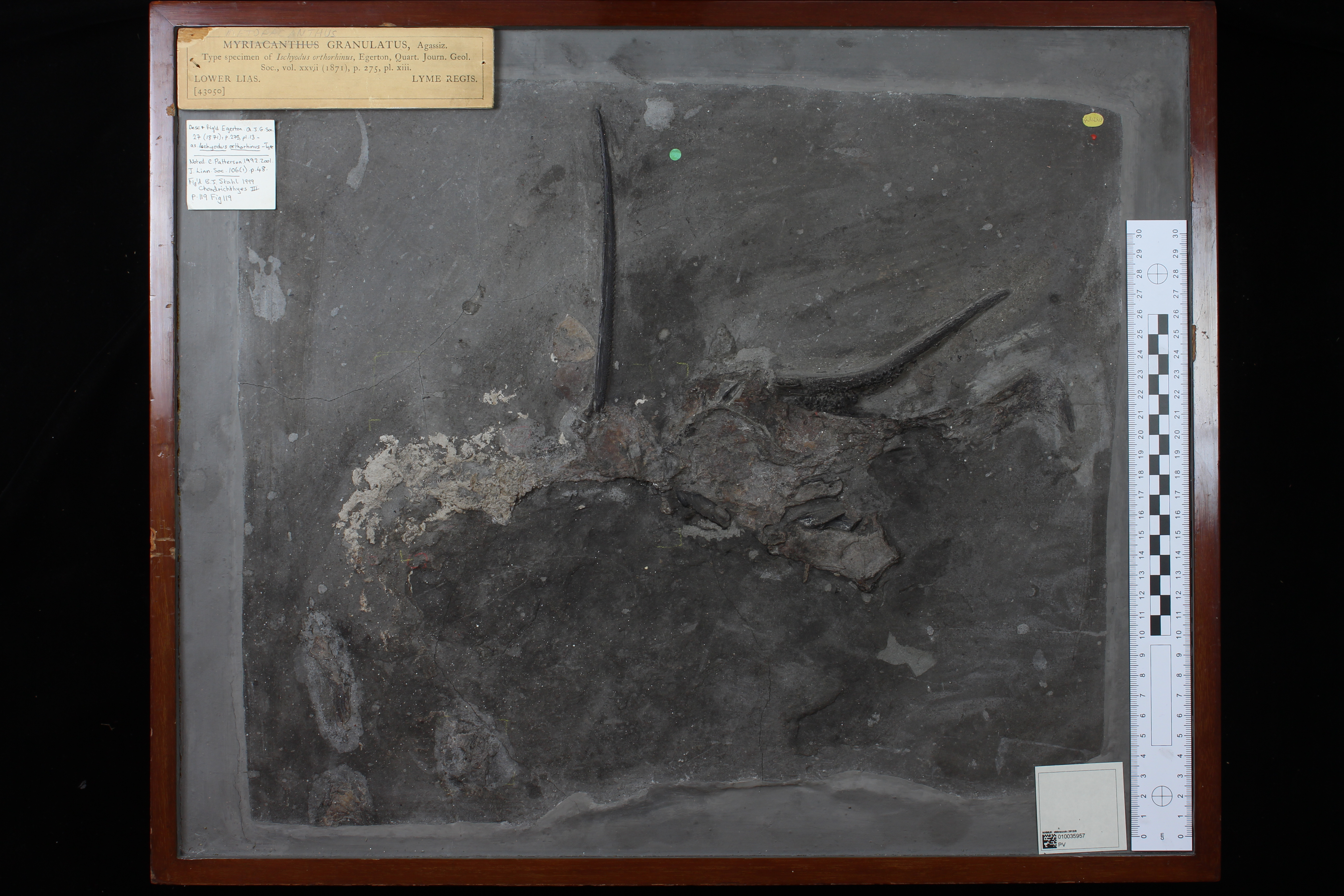
- Type specimen of M. granulatus, which was historically considered a species of Myriacanthus
- Life reconstruction of a male M. bollensis, with body reconstructed after Chimaeropsis

Scientific classification
- Kingdom: Animalia
- Phylum: Chordata
- Class: Chondrichthyes
- Subclass: Holocephali
- Order: Chimaeriformes
- Family: †Myriacanthidae
- Genus: †Metopacanthus; Zittel, 1887

Type species
- †Metopacanthus granulatus

Other species
- †Metopacanthus bollensis

= Metopacanthus =

Metopacanthus Temporal range: Toarcian

Extinct genus of cartilaginous fishes

Metopacanthus is an extinct genus of holocephalan cartilaginous fish from the Early Jurassic epoch in Europe. It is known from the Toarcian of the Posidonia Shale of Germany. It has an unusual jaw-like structure over the skull. It had long fin spine with length of 33 cm (13 in).
