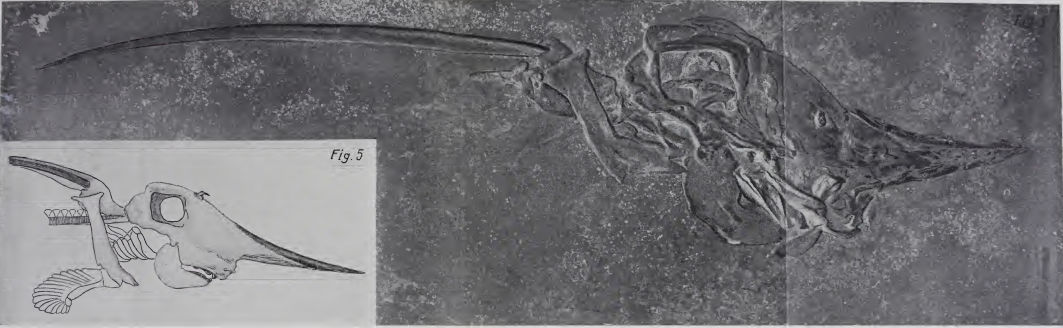
- Fossil and skeletal reconstruction of A. jaekeli
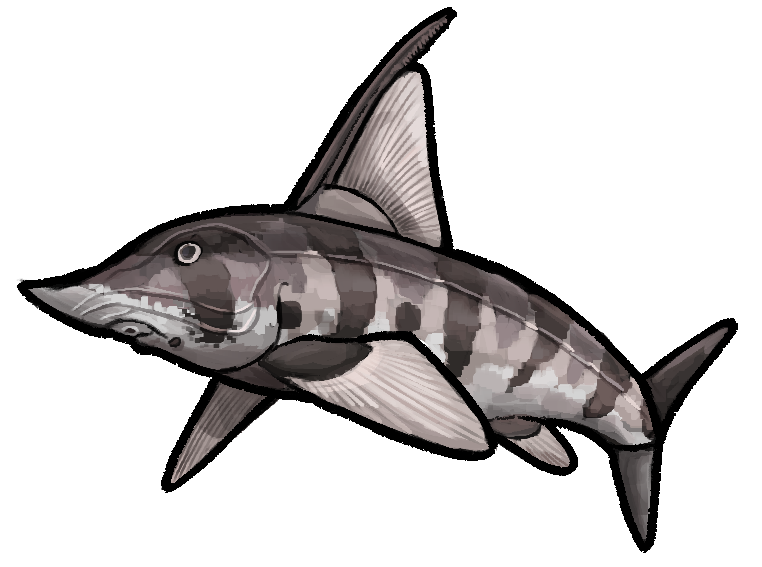
- Life restoration of A. jaekeli, with the body reconstructed after Chimaeropsis

Scientific classification
- Kingdom: Animalia
- Phylum: Chordata
- Class: Chondrichthyes
- Subclass: Holocephali
- Order: Chimaeriformes
- Family: †Myriacanthidae
- Genus: †Acanthorhina
- Species: †A. jaekeli

Binomial name
- †Acanthorhina jaekeli Fraas, 1910

= Acanthorhina =

Acanthorhina Temporal range: Toarcian

Extinct genus of cartilaginous fishes

Acanthorhina is an extinct genus of holocephalan cartilaginous fish from the Toarcian age of the Jurassic period. It currently contains a single species, A. jaekeli known from the Posidonia shale of Holzmaden, Germany.
