= Crucilobiceras =

Crucilobiceras Temporal range: Sinemurian

Scientific classification
- Kingdom: Animalia
- Phylum: Mollusca
- Class: Cephalopoda
- Subclass: †Ammonoidea
- Order: †Ammonitida
- Family: †Eoderoceratidae
- Subfamily: †Eoderoceratinae
- Genus: †Crucilobiceras; Buckman, 1920

Species
- C. cf. cheltiense; C. densinodulum; C. ornatilobatum

Crucilobiceras is an ammonoid cephalopod genus from the Lower Jurassic belonging to the eoderoceratoidean family Eoderoceratidae. Cruciliboceras has an evolute shell, such that all whorls are well exposed, with persistent radial ribbing and with spines or tubercles on the outer, ventral, rim, and in some, tubercles in the inner, umbilical, rim. The genus Crucilobiceras is commonly found along the Jurassic Coast of England.

Metaderoceras, named by Leonard Spath in 1925, is a jr. synonym for Crucilobiceras named by S.S. Buckman in 1920 according to Arkell et al., in the Treatise on Invertebrate Paleontology (1957).
