= Rhaetian sandstone =

The Rhaetian sandstone or Rhatsandstein (German: Rhätsandstein) is a geological formation in Germany. It dates back to the "Rhaetian - ?early Hettangian."

== Vertebrate fauna ==
Dinosaurs of the Rhatsandstein
Taxa	Presence	Notes	Images
Order: Saurischia; 1. Indeterminate theropod.; 2. Indeterminate ?Prosauropod.		1. Includes Megalosaurus cloacinus.; 2. Includes Plateosaurus ornatus.	

== See also ==
- List of dinosaur-bearing rock formations
