= Oberrhaet Formation =

Geologic formation in Austria

- Stratigraphic range: Rhaetian
- Type: Formation
- Underlies: Kendlbach Formation
- Overlies: Kössen Formation

Lithology
- Primary: limestone

Location
- Country: Austria

The Oberrhaet Formation, also known as the Oberrhaet Limestone, is a Late Triassic (Rhaetian-age) geological formation in Austria. It is a unit of massive dark grey bioclastic limestones, found within the Northern Calcareous Alps. The Oberrhaet Limestone was originally a series of reefs which developed on the northwest edge of the Eiberg Basin, a narrow marine waterway extending along the northwestern tip of the Neotethys Ocean. The center of the Eiberg Basin is nowadays preserved as the Eiberg Member of the Kössen Formation, which was deposited southeast of the Oberrhaet Limestone and interfingers with it in many areas. The Oberrhaet Limestone was very similar to the Dachstein Limestone, which represented carbonate platforms and reefs on the southeast edge of the Eiberg Basin. The most prominent components of the reefs were giant frond-like colonies of Retiophyllia, a scleractinian coral.

== See also ==
- List of fossiliferous stratigraphic units in Austria
