= Alethodontus =

Alethodontus Temporal range: Hettangian

Scientific classification
- Kingdom: Animalia
- Phylum: Chordata
- Class: Chondrichthyes
- Subclass: Holocephali
- Order: Chimaeriformes
- Family: †Myriacanthidae
- Genus: †Alethodontus; Duffin, 1983

Extinct genus of cartilaginous fishes

Alethodontus is an extinct genus of holocephalan cartilaginous fish from the Hettangian stage of the Jurassic period. It is known from a single species, A. bavariensis, known from Germany.
