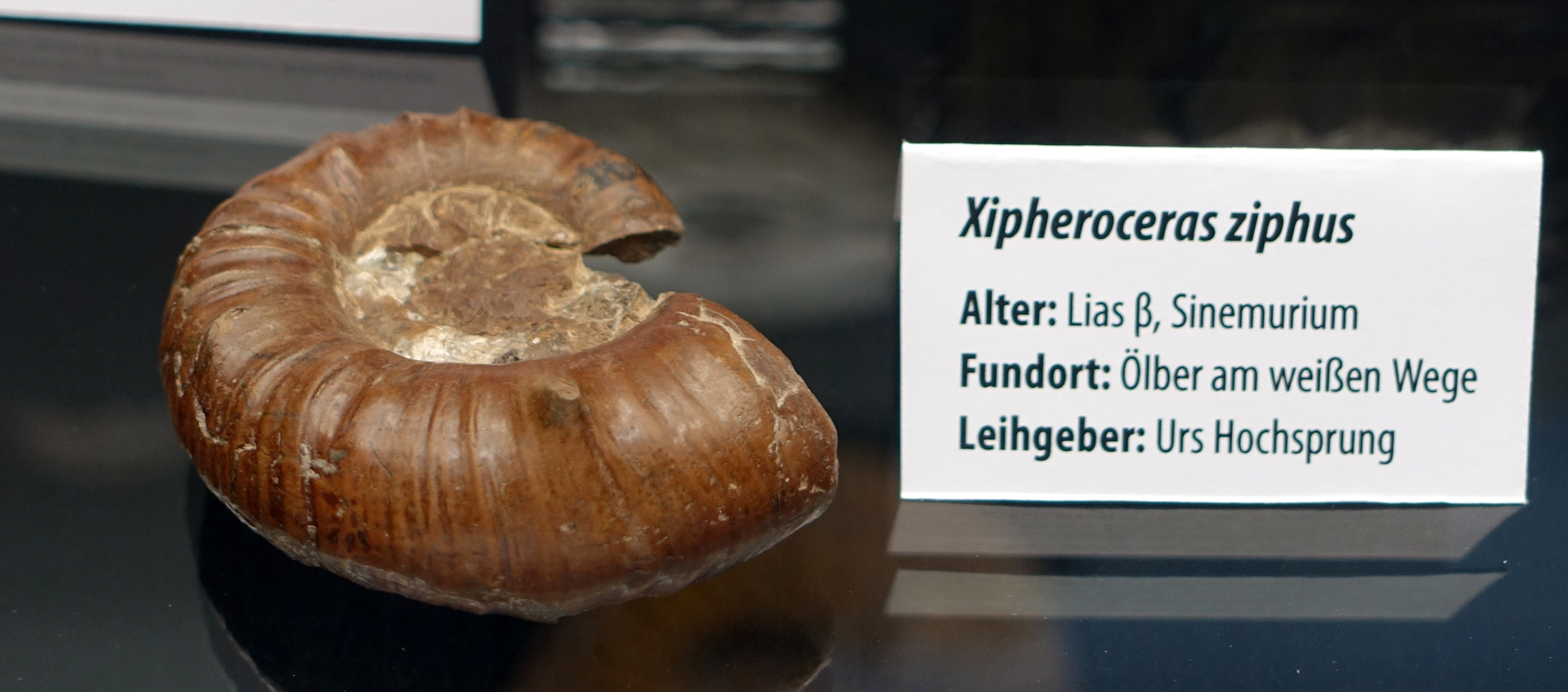
- Xipheroceras ziphus

Scientific classification
- Kingdom: Animalia
- Phylum: Mollusca
- Class: Cephalopoda
- Subclass: †Ammonoidea
- Order: †Ammonitida
- Family: †Eoderoceratidae
- Subfamily: †Eoderoceratinae
- Genus: †Xipheroceras; Buckman, 1911

= Xipheroceras =

Xipheroceras Temporal range: Sinemurian

Extinct genus of molluscs

Xipheroceras is a Lower Jurassic ammonite belonging to the Eoderoceratidae, and sometimes placed in the subfamily Xipheroceratinae for which it is the namesake. It has been found in the upper Sinemurian (about mid L Jurassic) of Europe and possibly Borneo.

Xipheroceras, named by Buckman, 1911, has an evolute shell, all whorls clearly exposed, only very slightly impressed dorsally (on the inside curvature). Inner and middle whorls have strong ribs with large spines at the outer ends. Outer whorls have closer simpler ribs.
