= Kössen Formation =

Late Triassic geological formation in the Northern Calcareous Alps

- Stratigraphic range: Rhaetian
- Type: Formation
- Sub-units: Hochalm Member, Eiberg Member, "Zirmenkopf limestone"
- Underlies: Kendlbach Formation, Oberrhaet Formation
- Overlies: Hauptdolomit Formation, Dachstein Formation

Lithology
- Primary: marl, limestone

Location
- Country: Austria; Germany; Switzerland

The Kössen Formation is a Late Triassic (Rhaetian-age) geological formation in the Northern Calcareous Alps of Austria and Germany, in the Tiroler-Lech Nature Park. During the Late Triassic, the area now occupied by the Northern Calcareous Alps was instead a long, passive coastline at the western tip of the Neotethys Ocean. The environment was initially dominated by a wide and shallow carbonate platform within a lagoon between the shore and a string of reefs. This carbonate platform is nowadays preserved as the Carnian to Norian-age Hauptdolomit and Dachstein Formation. The Kössen Formation represents a period of increased siliciclastic clay input into the lagoon, covering up the carbonate platform with marls and marly limestones instead of pure limestone or dolomite. The Eiberg Member of the Kössen Formation was deposited in the Eiberg basin, a narrow strip of deeper water which developed between the carbonate platform and the shoreline in the later part of the Rhaetian.

== See also ==
- List of fossiliferous stratigraphic units in Austria
- List of fossiliferous stratigraphic units in Germany
- List of fossiliferous stratigraphic units in Switzerland
