= Gonioloboceratidae =

Scientific classification
- Kingdom: Animalia
- Phylum: Mollusca
- Class: Cephalopoda
- Subclass: †Ammonoidea
- Order: †Goniatitida
- Superfamily: †Gonioloboceratoidea
- Family: †Gonioloboceratidae; Spath 1934

Genera
- Gonioloboceras; Gonioloboceratoides; Mescalites; Okafujiceras

Extinct family of molluscs

Gonioloboceratidae is one of three families of the Gonioloboceratoidea superfamily. They are an extinct group of ammonoid, which are shelled cephalopods related to squids, belemnites, octopuses, and cuttlefish, and more distantly to the nautiloids.
