= Gonioglyphioceratidae =

Scientific classification
- Kingdom: Animalia
- Phylum: Mollusca
- Class: Cephalopoda
- Subclass: †Ammonoidea
- Order: †Goniatitida
- Superfamily: †Gonioloboceratoidea
- Family: †Gonioglyphioceratidae; Ruzhencev & Bogoslovskaya, 1978

Genera
- Donetzoceras; Gonioglyphioceras; Megatrochoceras; Wewokites

Extinct family of molluscs

Gonioglyphioceratidae is one of three families of the Gonioloboceratoidea superfamily. They are an extinct group of ammonoid, which are shelled cephalopods related to squids, belemnites, octopuses, and cuttlefish, and more distantly to the nautiloids.
