= Wiedeyoceratidae =

Scientific classification
- Kingdom: Animalia
- Phylum: Mollusca
- Class: Cephalopoda
- Subclass: †Ammonoidea
- Order: †Goniatitida
- Superfamily: †Gonioloboceratoidea
- Family: †Wiedeyoceratidae; Ruzhencev & Bogoslovskaya, 1978

Genera
- Luganoceras; Mangeroceras; Pennoceras; Wiedeyoceras

Extinct family of molluscs

Wiedeyoceratidae is one of three families of the Gonioloboceratoidea superfamily. They are an extinct group of ammonoid, which are shelled cephalopods related to squids, belemnites, octopuses, and cuttlefish, and more distantly to the nautiloids.
