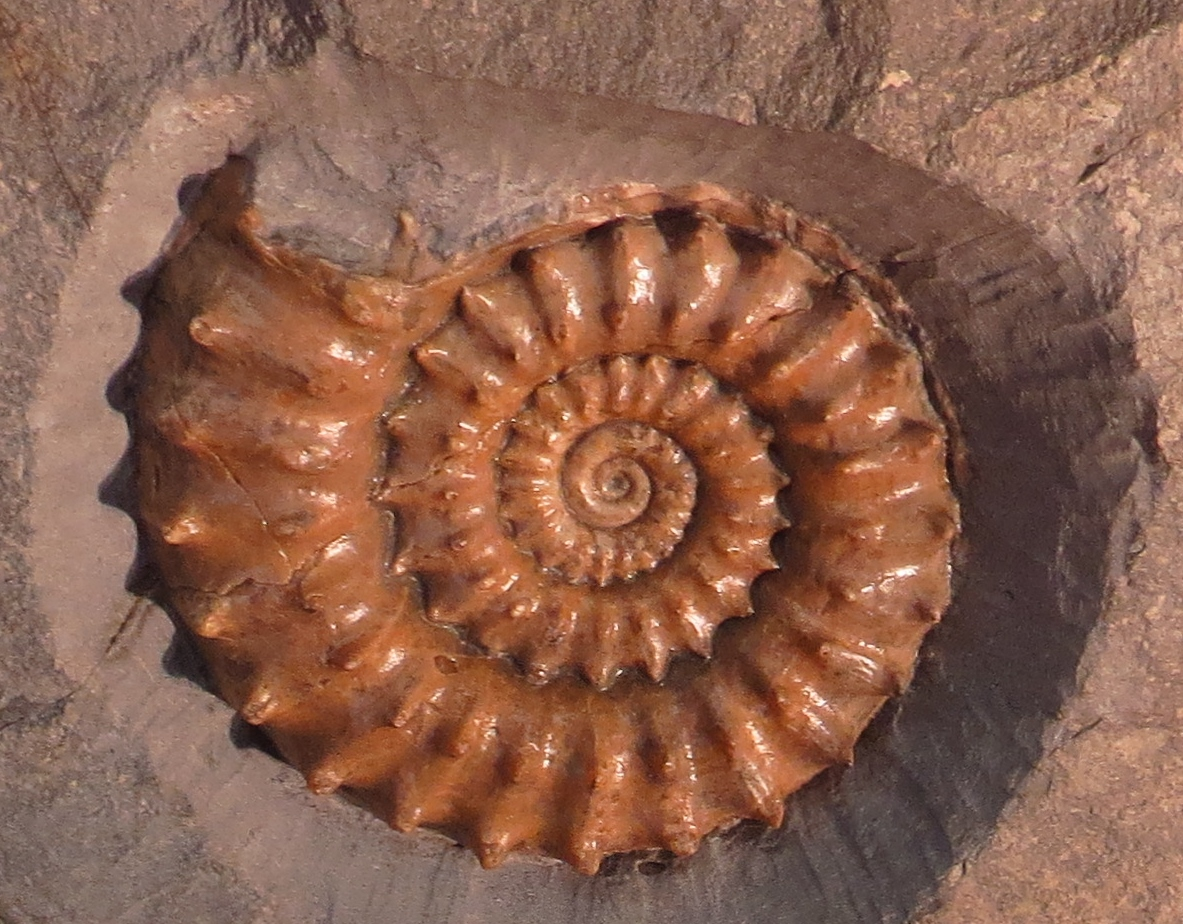
- A specimen from the Burgmeister Muller Museum, Solnhofen

Scientific classification
- Domain: Eukaryota
- Kingdom: Animalia
- Phylum: Mollusca
- Class: Cephalopoda
- Subclass: †Ammonoidea
- Order: †Ammonitida
- Family: †Eoderoceratidae
- Genus: †Microderoceras; Hyatt, 1871

Species
- Microderoceras birchi; Microderoceras nautilum

= Microderoceras =

Microderoceras Temporal range: Sinemurian

Extinct genus of ammonites

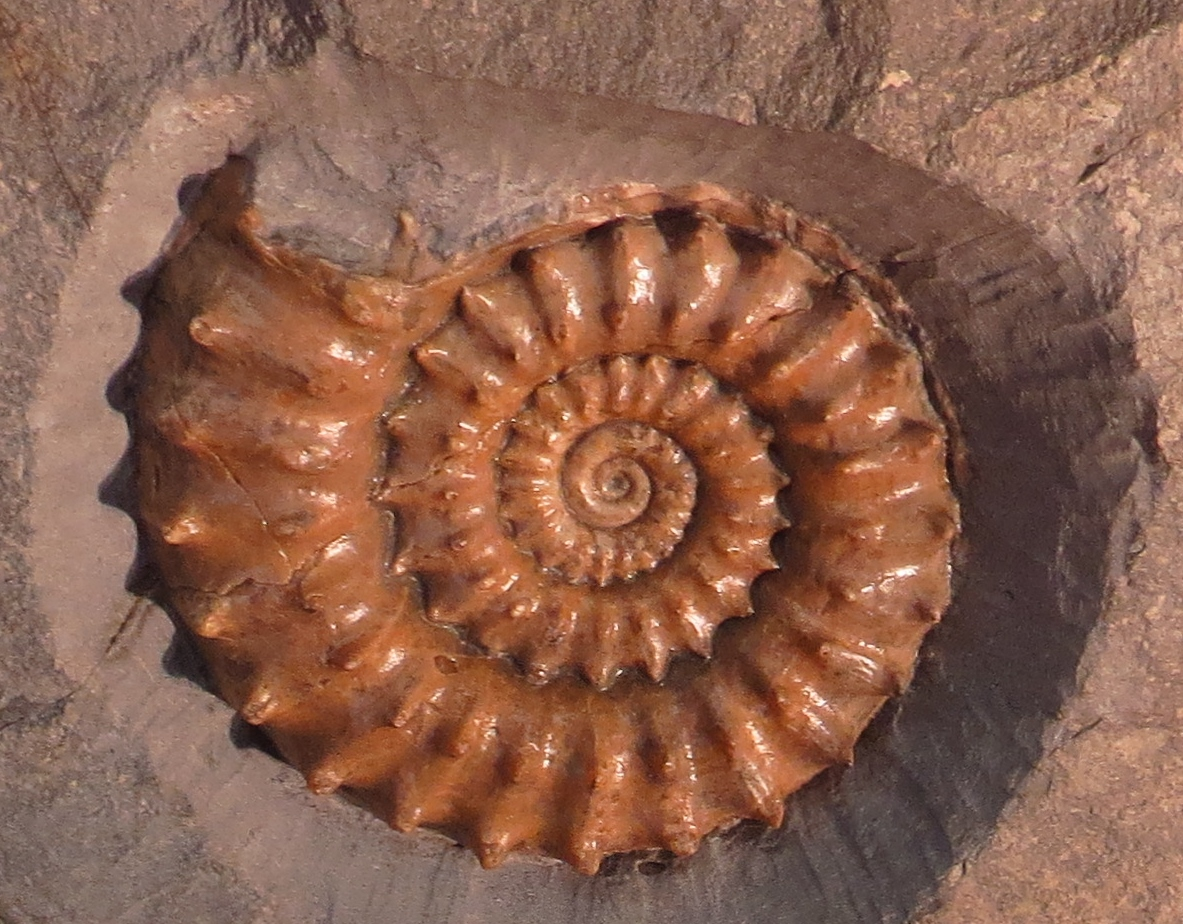

Microderoceras is a flat sided, evolute, radially ribbed Lower Jurassic ammonite belonging to the ammonitid family Eoderoceratidae and superfamily Eoderoceratoidea. Its whorls are subquadrangular in section; venter on the outer rim, rounded; sides with two rows if distinct spines, tubercles on internal molds, formed at either end of the ribs. The lateral surface of the ribcage is concave toward both sides, the lateral side of the dorsal and the lateral side of the ventral surface. The ribs are divided into six pairs (1-3) of the following types: 2-3 is the only type. In the first type, the ribs on the ventral face are fused to the ribs on the ventral sides; the ribs on the dorsal face are fused to the ribs on the dorsal sides. The second type represents the ribbed body, the ribs are in the same arrangement as in the first type and the rib cage does not fuse to the dorsal surface.

These shelled cephalopods, named by Alpheus Hyatt in 1871, are part of the now extinct Ammonoidea, which are distinct from the shelled nautiloids still found living today.

== Distribution ==
Microderoceras specimens are found in Argentina, Canada and the United Kingdom.
