= Donetzoceras =

Scientific classification
- Kingdom: Animalia
- Phylum: Mollusca
- Class: Cephalopoda
- Subclass: †Ammonoidea
- Order: †Goniatitida
- Family: †Gonioglyphioceratidae
- Genus: †Donetzoceras; Librovitch 1946

Extinct genus of molluscs

Donetzoceras is a genus belonging to the goniatitid family Gonioglyphioceratidae; extinct ammonoids which are shelled cephalopods more closely related to squid, octopus and other coleoids than to the superficially similar Nautilus

Donetzoceras has a relatively small, thick-discoidal shell, the inner whorls evolute, later stages involute. Sculpture consists of nodelike riblets and umbilical plications which disappear at maturity. Growth lines form shallow ventral sinus and ventrolateral salients. The ventral lobe pointed with a median saddle about half as high as entire ventral lobe itself.

Donetzoceras is the earliest genus now included in the Gonioglyphioceratidae. Donetzoceras is from the middle and upper Upper Carboniferous (Pennsylvanian)
