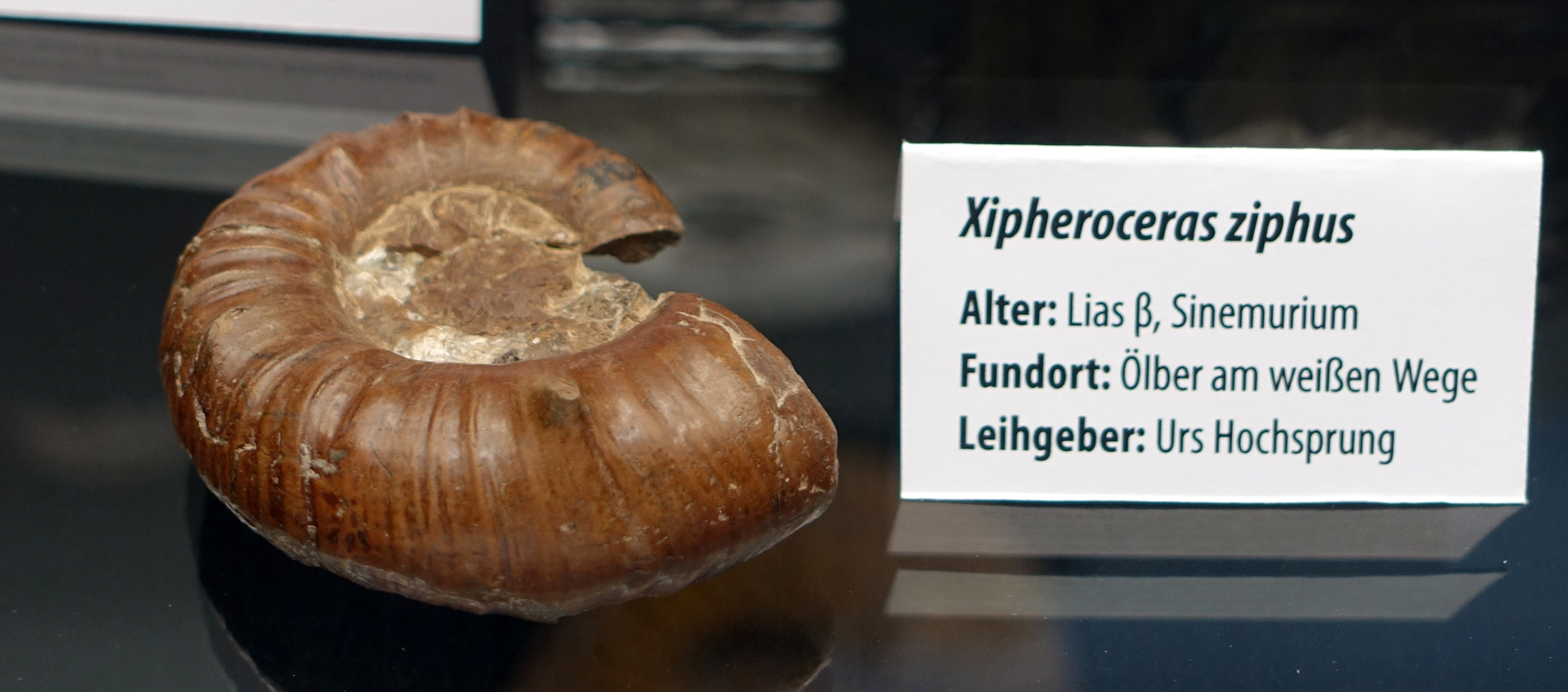
- Xipheroceras ziphus

Scientific classification
- Kingdom: Animalia
- Phylum: Mollusca
- Class: Cephalopoda
- Subclass: †Ammonoidea
- Order: †Ammonitida
- Suborder: †Ammonitina
- Superfamily: †Eoderoceratoidea; Spath, 1929

Families
- Amaltheidae; Coeloceratidae; Dactylioceratidae; Eoderoceratidae; Liparoceratidae; Phricodoceratidae; Polymorphitidae

= Eoderoceratoidea =

Eoderoceratoidea Temporal range: Lower Jurassic

Extinct superfamily of ammonites

Eoderoceratoidea is a superfamily of true ammonites (suborder Ammonitina) from the Lower Jurassic, comprising seven phylogenetically related families, characterized in general by having ribbed evolute shells that commonly bear spines or tubercles. Adult shell size ranges from 2 or 3 cm to giants reaching 50 cm in such genera as Apoderoceras, Epideroceras, and Liparoceras.

The earliest known eodoceroceratoidean is the eoderoceratid genus Microderoceras. Although its origin is uncertain, it is likely that it is derived from the Psiloceratoidea. It has also been proposed, with some imagination, that Microderoceas has its origin some earlier Jurassic lytoceratid such as Analytoceras.

Seven families are included, beginning with the Eoceroceratidae, which gave rise at about the same time to the Phricodoceratidae, Coeloceratidae, Liparoceratidae, and Polyhmorphitidae. The Phricodoceratidae left no descendants but the Coeloceratidae later gave rise to the Dactylioceratidae and the Liparoceratidae to the Amaltheidae. The Polymorphitidae became the source for the superfamilies Hildocerataceae beginning with the Hildoceratidae.

The more recent taxonomy of Donovan et al. (1981) with seven families, differs from that of Arkell, et al. in the Treatise (1957) which included just five families. The phricodoceratids and coeoloceratids were then considered as subfamilies (Phricodoceratinae and Coeloceratinae, respectively) of the Eoderoceratidae. As later (1981) the Liparoceratidae and Polyhmorphitidae were derived from the Eoderoceratidae but the Dactylioceratidae were derived separately (1957) from the Lytoceratidae - a source since then largely rejected.
