= Phricodoceratidae =

Phricodoceratidae Temporal range: Pliensbachian

Scientific classification
- Kingdom: Animalia
- Phylum: Mollusca
- Class: Cephalopoda
- Subclass: †Ammonoidea
- Order: †Ammonitida
- Superfamily: †Eoderoceratoidea
- Family: †Phricodoceratidae; Spath, 1938

Genera
- Phricodoceras; Epideroceras; Pseuduptonia

Extinct family of ammonites

Phricodoceratidae is a family in the Eoderoceratoidea, aberrant ammonites from the Lower Jurassic characterized by a large adult size and a marked change of shell form and ornament with growth. Shells are stoutly ribbed, early growth stage is round-whorled with spines, followed by a high-whorled late growth stage with smooth, modified ribbing.

Three genera are currently placed in the Phricodoceratidae: Phricodoceras, Epideroceras, and Pseuduptonia.
