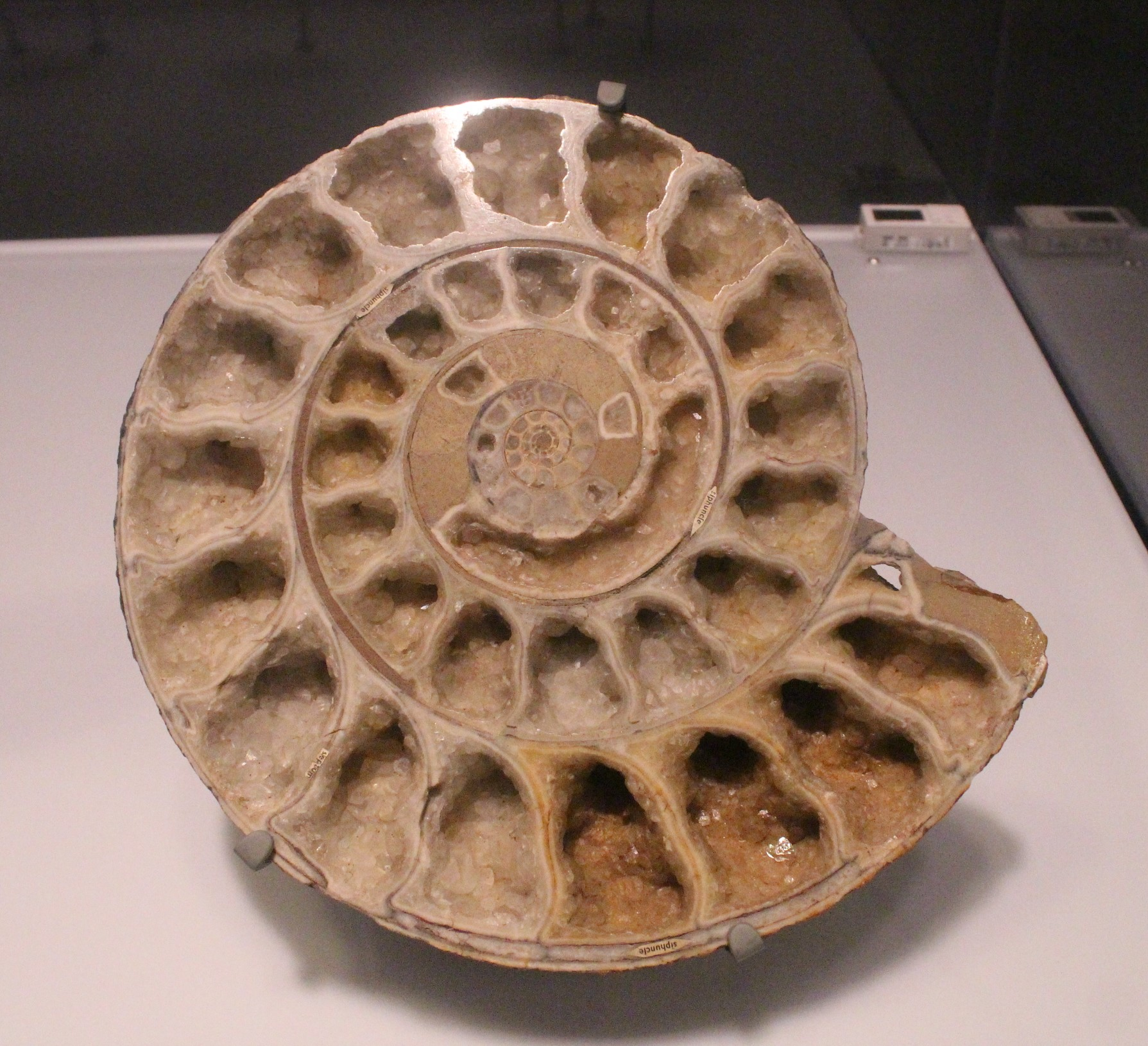
- Apoderoceras sp.

Scientific classification
- Kingdom: Animalia
- Phylum: Mollusca
- Class: Cephalopoda
- Subclass: †Ammonoidea
- Order: †Ammonitida
- Superfamily: †Eoderoceratoidea
- Family: †Coeloceratidae

Genera
- Coeloceras; Apoderoceras; Coeloderoceras; Hyperderoceras; Pimalites; Praesphaeroceras; Tetraspidoceras

= Coeloceratidae =

Coeloceratidae Temporal range: Hettangian–Toarcian

Extinct family of ammonites

Coeloceratidae is a family of ammonites belonging to the Eoderoceratoidea that lived during the Early Jurassic. Shells are evolute, tending to be broadly discoidal with depressed whorls bearing primary and secondary ribs that branch from outer lateral tubercles. Most of the included species have coronate inner whorls and outer tubercles only. In general, Coeloceratids resemble the Middle Jurassic Stephanoceras. Once regarded as the subfamily Coeloceratinae in the Eoderoceratidae, these ammonites are now given familial rank.

Genera included in the Coeloceratidae are Coeloceras, Apoderoceras Coeloderoceras, Hyperderoceras, Pimalites, Praesphaeroceras, and Tetraspidoceras. Tetraspidoceras, which is bituberculate, is a possible ancestral member of the family.

The Coeloceratidae give rise to the Dactylioceratidae
