= Kendlbach Formation =

Geological formation in Austria and Italy

- Stratigraphic range: latest Rhaetian - Hettangian
- Type: Formation
- Sub-units: Tiefengraben Member, Breitenberg Member
- Underlies: Adnet Formation
- Overlies: Kössen Formation, Oberrhaet Limestone

Lithology
- Primary: marl, claystone
- Other: shale, siltstone, limestone

Location
- Country: Austria; Italy

The Kendlbach Formation is a Late Triassic (latest Rhaetian) to Early Jurassic (Hettangian) geological formation in Austria and Italy. It contains the Global Boundary Stratotype Section and Point (GSSP) for the Hettangian stage (the first stage of the Jurassic period) at the Kuhjoch section in the Karwendel Mountains of Austria.

The Kendlbach Formation consists of clay-rich marls and other sediments deposited during and immediately after the Triassic-Jurassic extinction event at the end of the Rhaetian stage. It has two subunits: the thick Tiefengraben Member, which is deprived of limestone, and the succeeding Breitenberg Member, a thinner sequence which shows the return of limestone. Like the underlying Kössen Formation, sediments of the Kendlbach Formation were deposited within the Eiberg Basin, a seaway which developed along the northwest tip of the Neotethys Ocean in the region now occupied by the Northern Calcareous Alps.

The boundary between the Kössen and Kendlbach formations is marked by a sharp transition from limestone to dark shales and marls. The boundary also shows a strong negative δ^{13}C organic carbon isotope excursion as well as the extinction of many species of palynomorphs and marine invertebrates. The interval experiences an influx of freshwater palynomorphs, namely Classopollis pollen (from drought-tolerant Cheirolepidiaceae conifers) followed by spores and Cymatiosphaera (a type of prasinophyte algae). Some outcrops show a layer of reddish sediment, the Schattwald Beds, which follows the initial boundary interval. Above the Schattwald Beds occur the first fossils of Jurassic ammonites such as Psiloceras spelae, indicating the formal beginning of the Jurassic period.

== See also ==
- List of fossiliferous stratigraphic units in Austria
