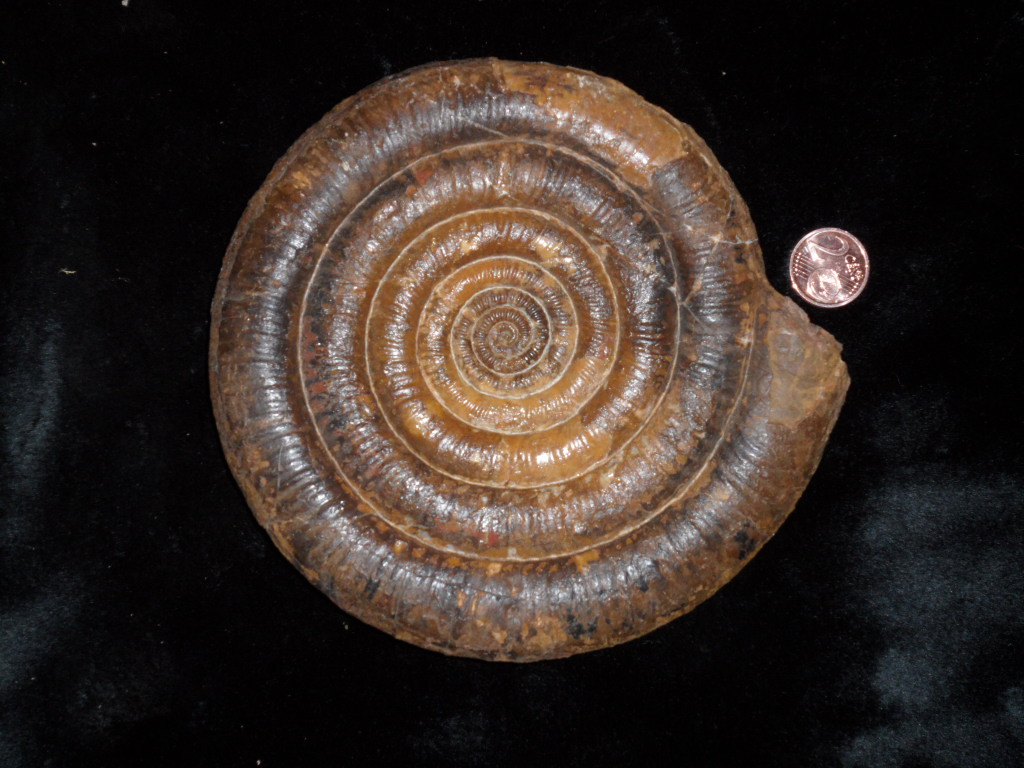
- Alsatites proaries

Scientific classification
- Domain: Eukaryota
- Kingdom: Animalia
- Phylum: Mollusca
- Class: Cephalopoda
- Subclass: †Ammonoidea
- Order: †Ammonitida
- Family: †Arietitidae
- Subfamily: †Alsatitinae
- Genus: †Alsatites; Haug 1894

= Alsatites =

Alsatites Temporal range: Hettangian

Genus of molluscs (fossil)

Alsatites is an extinct genus of cephalopod belonging to the Ammonite subclass. They lived during the Hettangian and are generally extremely evolute, many whorled. Keel broad and blunt organisms, they also exhibit a primary ribbing which is close and persistent.
