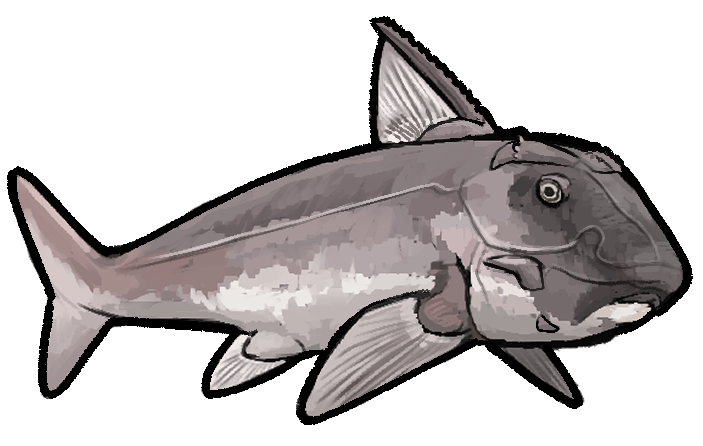
- Life restoration of Chimaeropsis paradoxa
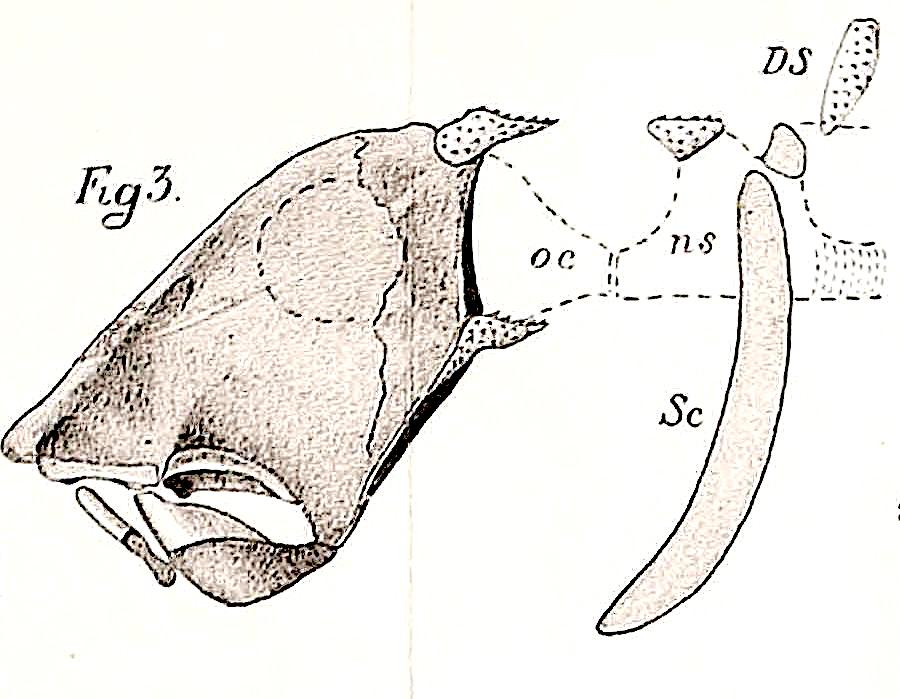
- Illustration of a well-preserved specimen destroyed during World War II, from Reis (1895)

Scientific classification
- Kingdom: Animalia
- Phylum: Chordata
- Class: Chondrichthyes
- Subclass: Holocephali
- Order: Chimaeriformes
- Family: †Chimaeropsidae; Patterson, 1965
- Genus: †Chimaeropsis; Zittel, 1887

Type species
- Chimaeropsis paradoxa Zittel, 1887

Other species
- C. foussi Cassier, 1959; C. franconicus Munster, 1840

= Chimaeropsis =

Chimaeropsis Temporal range: Early Jurassic–Late Jurassic

Extinct genus of chimaeriform fish

Chimaeropsis is an extinct genus of cartilaginous fish related to modern chimaeras, known from the Jurassic of Europe.

== Taxonomy ==
The genus and species Chimaeropsis paradoxa was originally erected in 1887 by Zittel, based on a "'fairly well-preserved skeleton", which was around 1 metre (3.3 ft) long found in the Upper Jurassic Plattenkalk limestones of Germany. This specimen, while partially described by both Zittel and Riess in 1887 and later again by Reiss in 1895, was never properly figured and is assumed to have been destroyed by bombings during World War II. As the only other known specimens of the species were fragmentary, this left much of the anatomy of the species enigmatic for most of the 20th century and early 21st century. In 1965, Patterson placed it as the only known member of its family, the Chimaeropsidae, and closely related to the family Myriacanthidae within the clade Myriacanthoidei. In modern taxonomic schemes, Myriacanthoidei has been placed as closely related to modern chimaeras, with both groups placed within the Chimaeriformes.

In 2018, a new complete skeleton of C. paradoxa was from the Plattenkalk limestones was mentioned in a conference abstract and then fully described in 2025, illuminating the anatomy of the species. This study considered the placement of Chimaeropsis as a myriacanthoid within its own family separate from myriacanthids valid.

In addition to C. paradoxa, two other species have been recognised, these include C. franconicus (originally described as a species of Myriacanthus) known from a single fin spine found around Rabenstein in Bavaria, Germany, also dating to the Late Jurassic, as well as C. foussi, which was erected from a single fragmentary tooth plate found in limestone deposits from near Ethe, Belgium, dating to the Sinemurian stage of the Early Jurassic.

== Description ==
The newly described complete specimen of C. paradoxa described in 2025 has a body length of around 63 centimetres (25 in). Unlike members of Myriacanthidae, the rostrum of C. paradoxa is very short and blunt, with the head making about 25% of the total length, and over half as deep as it is long. The head is covered in dermal plates, which includes 4 pairs and one unpaired plate, which have a tuberculate texture. The tail fin is homocercal (having equally sized upper and lower lobes). The dorsal fin spine lacks denticles running along its posterior face but has them running along the vast majority (around 95%) of the length of the front-facing (anterior) edge of the spine. These denticles vary irregularly in size, are ornamented with striations, and arranged into a somewhat irregular alternating pattern on either side of the midline of the spine. C. franconicus differs from C. paradoxa in having denticles on both the back and front-facing edges of the dorsal fin spine. The body was covered in scales, about 1 millimetre (3/64 in) across, which are mostly symmetrical and star-like, with rays projecting outwards from a central flared base, though some bilaterally symmetrical branching scales are also present. Like other chimaeriforms, Chimaeropsis has a dentition made up of tooth plates. These include an unpaired symphyseal plate at the front of the lower jaw, as well as a pair of tooth plates on the lower jaw posterior to the symphyseal tooth plate, with the upper jaw having two pairs of tooth plates.

== Ecology ==
The teeth of Chimaeropsis, like those of other myriacanthoids, served to crush prey. Chimaeropsis is one of three known holocephalans known from the "Solnhofen Archipelago", alongside the true chimaeras Ischyodus and Elasmodectes.
