= Hettangian =

First age of the Early Jurassic

- 201.4 ± 0.2 – 199.5 ± 0.3 Ma
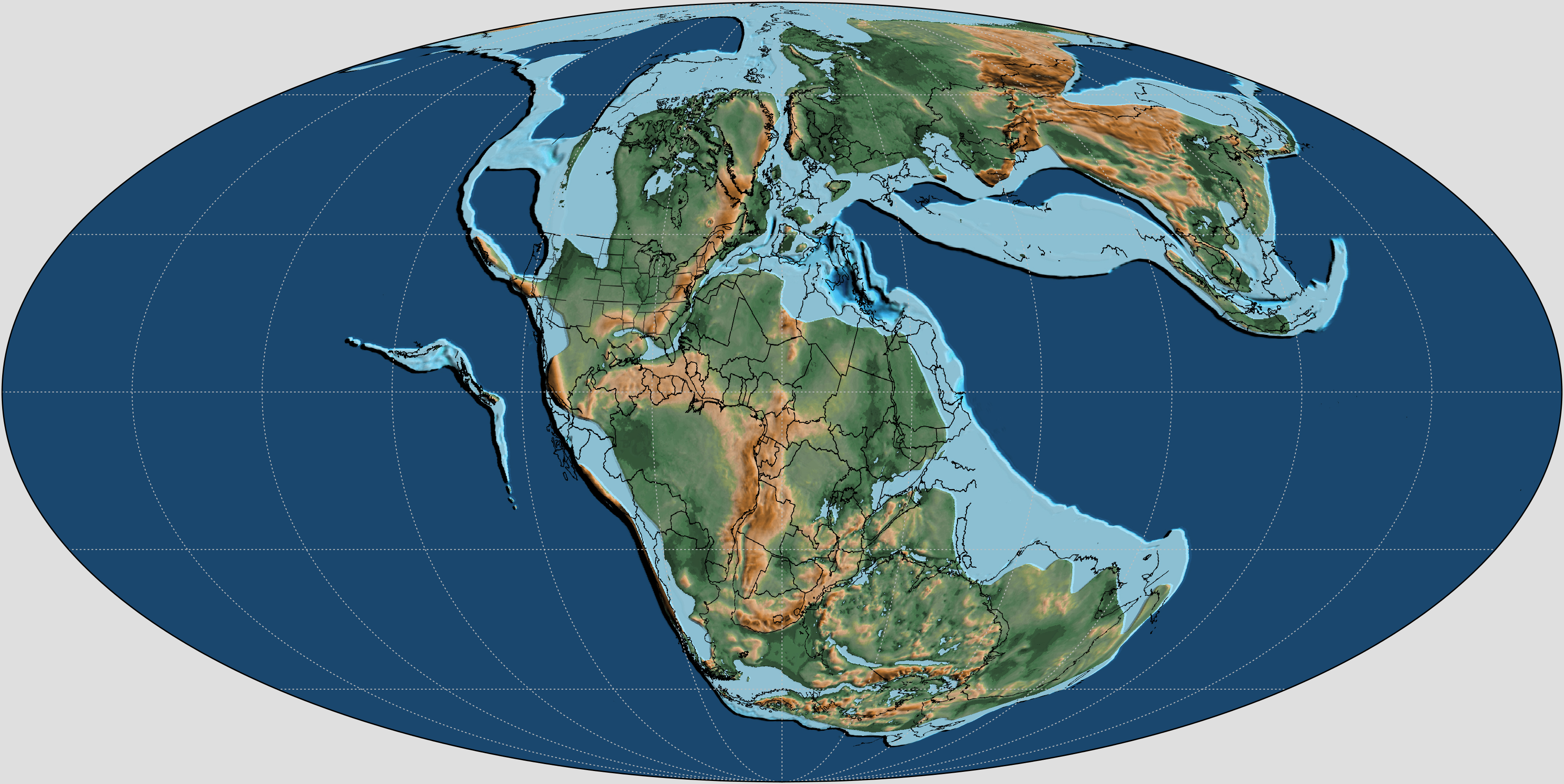
- Mollweide map of Earth 200 million years ago, with black outlines depicting countries in their locations

Chronology
← / Triassic–Jurassic extinction event
Subdivision of the Jurassic according to the ICS, as of 2024. Vertical axis scale: Millions of years ago

Etymology
- Name formality: Formal

Usage information
- Celestial body: Earth
- Regional usage: Global (ICS)
- Time scale(s) used: ICS Time Scale

Definition
- Chronological unit: Age
- Stratigraphic unit: Stage
- Time span formality: Formal
- Lower boundary definition: FAD of the Ammonite Psiloceras spelae tirolicum.
- Lower boundary GSSP: Kuhjoch section, Karwendel mountains, Northern Calcareous Alps, Austria; 47.4839°N 11.5306°E
- Lower GSSP ratified: 2010
- Upper boundary definition: FAD of the Ammonites Vermiceras quantoxense and Vermiceras palmeri
- Upper boundary GSSP: East Quantoxhead, West Somerset, England, UK; 51.1909°N 3.2364°W
- Upper GSSP ratified: 2000

The Hettangian is the earliest age and lowest stage of the Jurassic Period of the geologic timescale. It spans the time between 201.3 ± 0.2 Ma and 199.3 ± 0.3 Ma (million years ago). The Hettangian follows the Rhaetian (part of the Triassic Period) and is followed by the Sinemurian.

In European stratigraphy the Hettangian is a part of the time span in which the Lias was deposited. An example is the British Blue Lias, which has an upper Rhaetian to Sinemurian age. Another example is the lower Lias from the Northern Limestone Alps where well-preserved but very rare ammonites, including Alsatites, have been found.

== Stratigraphic definitions ==
The Hettangian was introduced in the literature by Swiss palaeontologist, Eugène Renevier, in 1864. The stage takes its name from Hettange-Grande, a town in north-eastern France, just south of the border with Luxembourg on the main road from Luxembourg City to Metz.

The base of the Hettangian Stage (which is also the base of the Lower Jurassic Series and the entire Jurassic System) is defined as the place in the stratigraphic column where fossils of the ammonite genus Psiloceras first appear. A global reference profile (a GSSP) for the base was defined 2010 for an exposure of the Kendlbach Formation at the Kuhjoch section in the Karwendel Mountains of western Austria. The top of the Hettangian Stage (the base of the Sinemurian) is at the first appearances of ammonite genera Vermiceras and Metophioceras.

=== Biostratigraphy ===
The Hettangian contains three ammonite biozones in the Tethys domain:

- zone of Schlotheimia angulata
- zone of Alsatites liasicus
- zone of Psiloceras planorbis

== See also ==
- Triassic-Jurassic extinction event
