= Bifericeras =

Bifericeras Temporal range: Sinemurian

Scientific classification
- Kingdom: Animalia
- Phylum: Mollusca
- Class: Cephalopoda
- Subclass: †Ammonoidea
- Order: †Ammonitida
- Family: †Eoderoceratidae
- Genus: †Bifericeras; Buckman, 1913

Species
- B. annulosum; B. bifer; B. curvicosta; B. juengsti; B. nudicosta; B. reclinatum; B. serpentinum; B. soelli; B. subplanicosta; B. vitreum

Bifericeras is a Lower Jurassic ammonite belonging to the family Eoderoceratidae, and sometimes placed in the subfamily Xipherceratinae. Whorls are strongly depressed, but still evolute in coiling. The early growth state is prolonged, and smooth, followed by a late growth stage with rounded, straight, bituberculate ribs.

Bifericeras was named by Buckman in 1913 and is found in Europe.

== Biostratigraphic significance ==
The International Commission on Stratigraphy (ICS) has assigned the First Appearance Datum of Bifericeras donovani and of genus Apoderoceras the defining biological marker for the start of the Pliensbachian Stage of the Jurassic, 190.8 ± 1.0 million years ago.

== Distribution ==
Only found at Dimmer Camp, Castle Cary, Somerset.
