= Astrochronology =

Dating of sedimentary units by calibration with astronomically tuned timescales

Astrochronology is the dating of sedimentary units by calibration with astronomically tuned timescales, such as Milankovic cycles, or even sunspot cycles. When used in concert with radiometric dating, it allows the resolution of timescales to a high degree of accuracy. If orbital precession cycles are identified, the dating error can be as low as 21,000 years.
