= Sinemurian =

Second age of the Early Jurassic

- 199.5 ± 0.3 – 192.9 ± 0.3 Ma
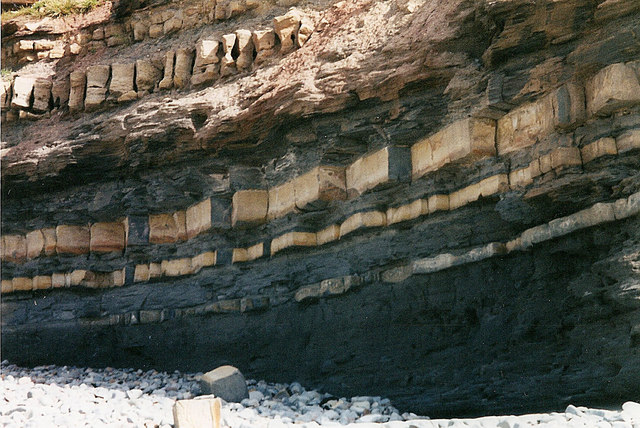
- Jurassic rock strata in the cliffs at East Quantoxhead, near the Sinemurian golden spike.

Chronology
| ← / Triassic–Jurassic extinction event |
Subdivision of the Jurassic according to the ICS, as of 2024. Vertical axis scale: Millions of years ago

Etymology
- Name formality: Formal

Usage information
- Celestial body: Earth
- Regional usage: Global (ICS)
- Time scale(s) used: ICS Time Scale

Definition
- Chronological unit: Age
- Stratigraphic unit: Stage
- Time span formality: Formal
- Lower boundary definition: FAD of the Ammonites Vermiceras quantoxense and Vermiceras palmeri
- Lower boundary GSSP: East Quantoxhead, West Somerset, England, UK; 51.1909°N 3.2364°W
- Lower GSSP ratified: 2000
- Upper boundary definition: FAD of the Ammonite species Bifericeras donovani and genus Apoderoceras
- Upper boundary GSSP: Robin Hood's Bay, Yorkshire, England, UK; 54.4069°N 0.4975°W
- Upper GSSP ratified: March 2005

In the geologic timescale, the Sinemurian is an age and stage in the Early or Lower Jurassic Epoch or Series. It spans the time between 199.5 ±0.3 Ma and 192.9 ±0.3 Ma (million years ago). The Sinemurian is preceded by the Hettangian and is followed by the Pliensbachian.

In Europe the Sinemurian age, together with the Hettangian age, saw the deposition of the lower Lias, in Great Britain known as the Blue Lias.

== Stratigraphic definitions ==
The Sinemurian Stage was defined and introduced into scientific literature by French palaeontologist Alcide d'Orbigny in 1842. It takes its name from the French town of Semur-en-Auxois, near Dijon. The calcareous soil formed from the Jurassic limestone of the region is in part responsible for the character of the classic Sancerre wines.

The base of the Sinemurian Stage is at the first appearance of the ammonite genera Vermiceras and Metophioceras in the stratigraphic record. A global reference profile (GSSP or golden spike) for the Sinemurian Stage is located in a cliff north of the hamlet of East Quantoxhead, 6 kilometers (3.7 mi) east of Watchet, Somerset, England.

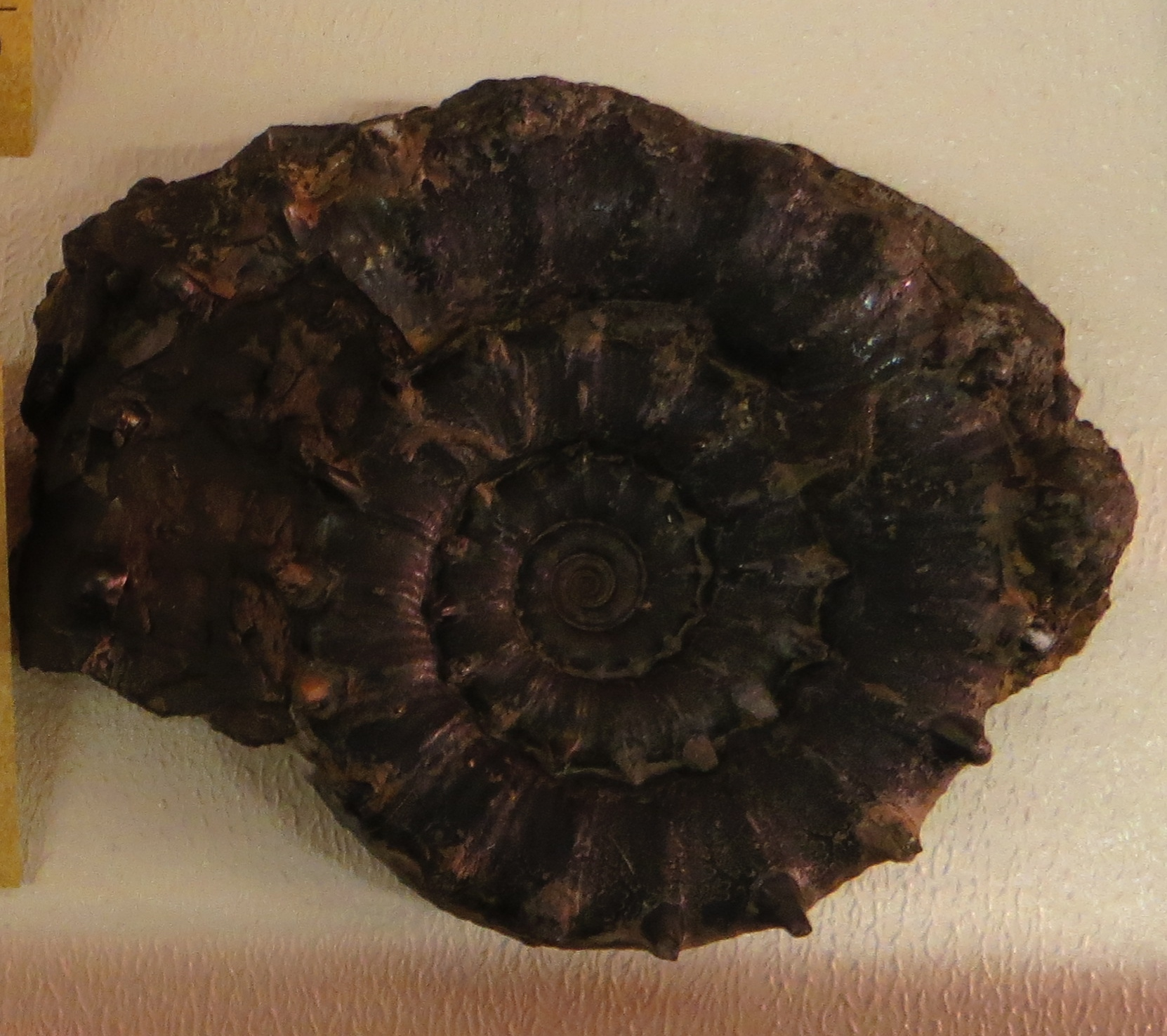
Eteoderoceras armatum, a Sinemurian ammonite

The top of the Sinemurian (the base of the Pliensbachian) is at the first appearances of the ammonite species Bifericeras donovani and ammonite genus Apoderoceras.

The Sinemurian contains six ammonite biozones in the Tethys domain:

- zone of Echioceras raricostatum
- zone of Oxynoticeras oxynotum
- zone of Asteroceras obtusum
- zone of Caenisites turneri
- zone of Arnioceras semicostatum
- zone of Arietites bucklandi

== Sources ==
- Bloos, G. & Page, K.N.; 2001: Global Stratotype Section and Point for base of the Sinemurian Stage (Lower Jurassic), Episodes 25(1), pp. 22–28, PDF
- Gradstein, F.M.; Ogg, J.G. & Smith, A.G.; 2004: A Geologic Time Scale 2004, Cambridge University Press.
- d´Orbigny, A.C.V.M.D.; 1842: Paléontologie française. 1. Terrains oolitiques ou jurassiques, Bertrand, Paris. (in French)

=== See also ===
- Komlosaurus carbonis
