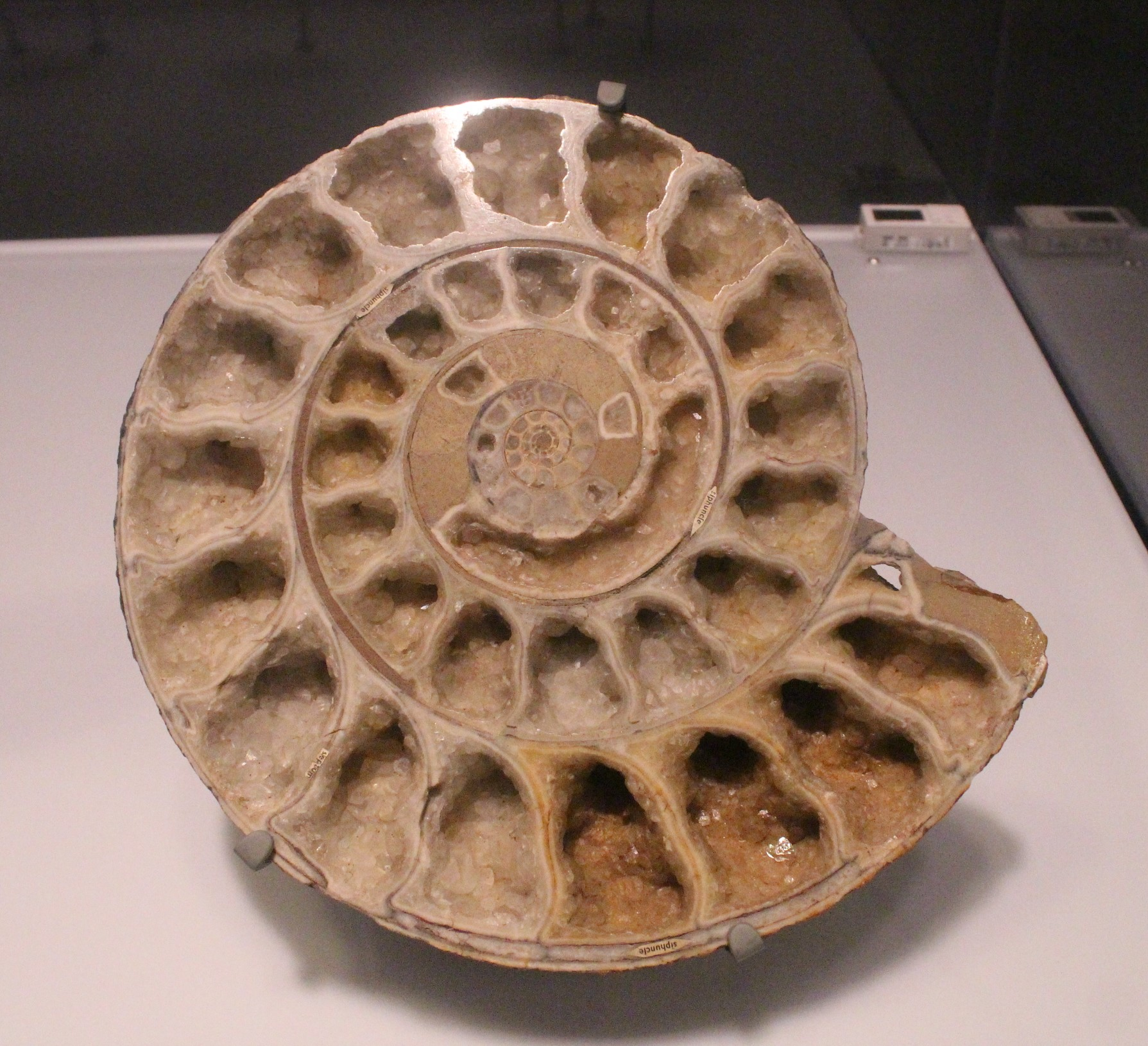
- Fossil specimen at Field Museum of Natural History

Scientific classification
- Kingdom: Animalia
- Phylum: Mollusca
- Class: Cephalopoda
- Subclass: †Ammonoidea
- Order: †Ammonitida
- Family: †Coeloceratidae
- Genus: †Apoderoceras; Buckman, 1921

Species
- †Apoderoceras antiquum Lóczy, 1915; †Apoderoceras dunrobinense Spath, 1926; †Apoderoceras ferox Buckman, 1925; †Apoderoceras sparsinodum Quenstedt, 1849; †Apoderoceras subtriangulare Young and Bird, 1822

= Apoderoceras =

Apoderoceras Temporal range: Pliensbachian

Genus of molluscs (fossil)

Apoderoceras is an extinct genus of cephalopod belonging to the ammonite subclass.

Ammonites (Apoderoceras) were predatory mollusks that resembled a squid with a shell. These cephalopods had eyes, tentacles, and spiral shells. They are more closely related to a living octopus, though the shells resemble that of a nautilus. True ammonites appeared in the fossil record about 240 million years ago. The last lineages disappeared 65 million years ago at the end of the Cretaceous.

== Biostratigraphic significance ==
The International Commission on Stratigraphy (ICS) has assigned the First Appearance Datum of genus Apoderoceras and of Bifericeras donovani the defining biological marker for the start of the Pliensbachian Stage of the Jurassic, 190.8 ± 1.0 million years ago.

== Distribution ==
Jurassic of Argentina, Hungary, Italy, Portugal, the United Kingdom
