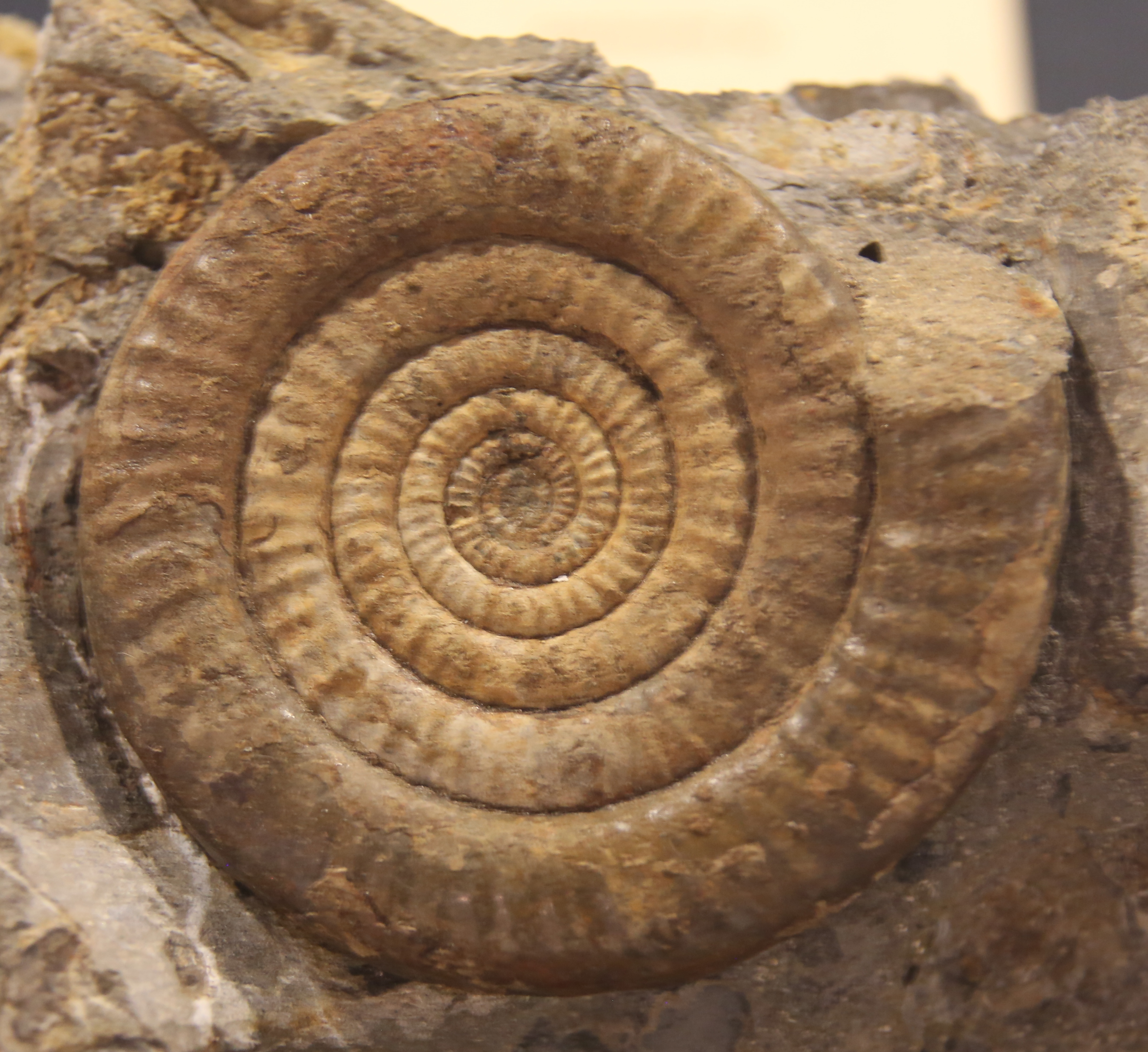
- Vermiceras scylla fossil

Scientific classification
- Kingdom: Animalia
- Phylum: Mollusca
- Class: Cephalopoda
- Subclass: †Ammonoidea
- Order: †Ammonitida
- Family: †Arietitidae
- Subfamily: †Arietitinae
- Genus: †Vermiceras; Hyatt, 1889

Species
- See text

Synonyms
- Metophioceras; Protocymbites; Gyrophioceras; Paracaloceras

= Vermiceras =

Vermiceras Temporal range: Hettangian–Sinemurian

Genus of molluscs (fossil)

Vermiceras is an ammonite that belongs to the order Ammonitida. Its shell is evolute and is covered in nonbranching ribs. Its whorls do not increase in size very fast, but there are many revolutions on its shell, which is fairly narrow. It has a sharp ventral keel and a diameter of about 5.2 centimeters (2 inches). It lived in the Early Jurassic.

== Subgenera and species ==
- V. (=Metophioceras) galaczi
- V. (=Metophioceras) rotarium
- V. (=Metophioceras) rotticus
- V. (=Metophioceras) trigonatum
- V. (=Protocymbites) azzouzi
- V. densicostatum
- V. (Gyrophioceras)
  - V. (G.) mineralense
  - V. (G.) morganense
  - V. (G.) praespiratissimum
  - V. (G.) supraspiratum
- V. (Paracaloceras)
  - V. (P.) concavum
  - V. (P.) coregonense
  - V. (P.) multicostatum
  - V. (P.) rursicostatum
  - V. (P.) varaense
