= Rhaetian =

Latest age of the Triassic Period

- ~205.7 – 201.4 ± 0.2 Ma
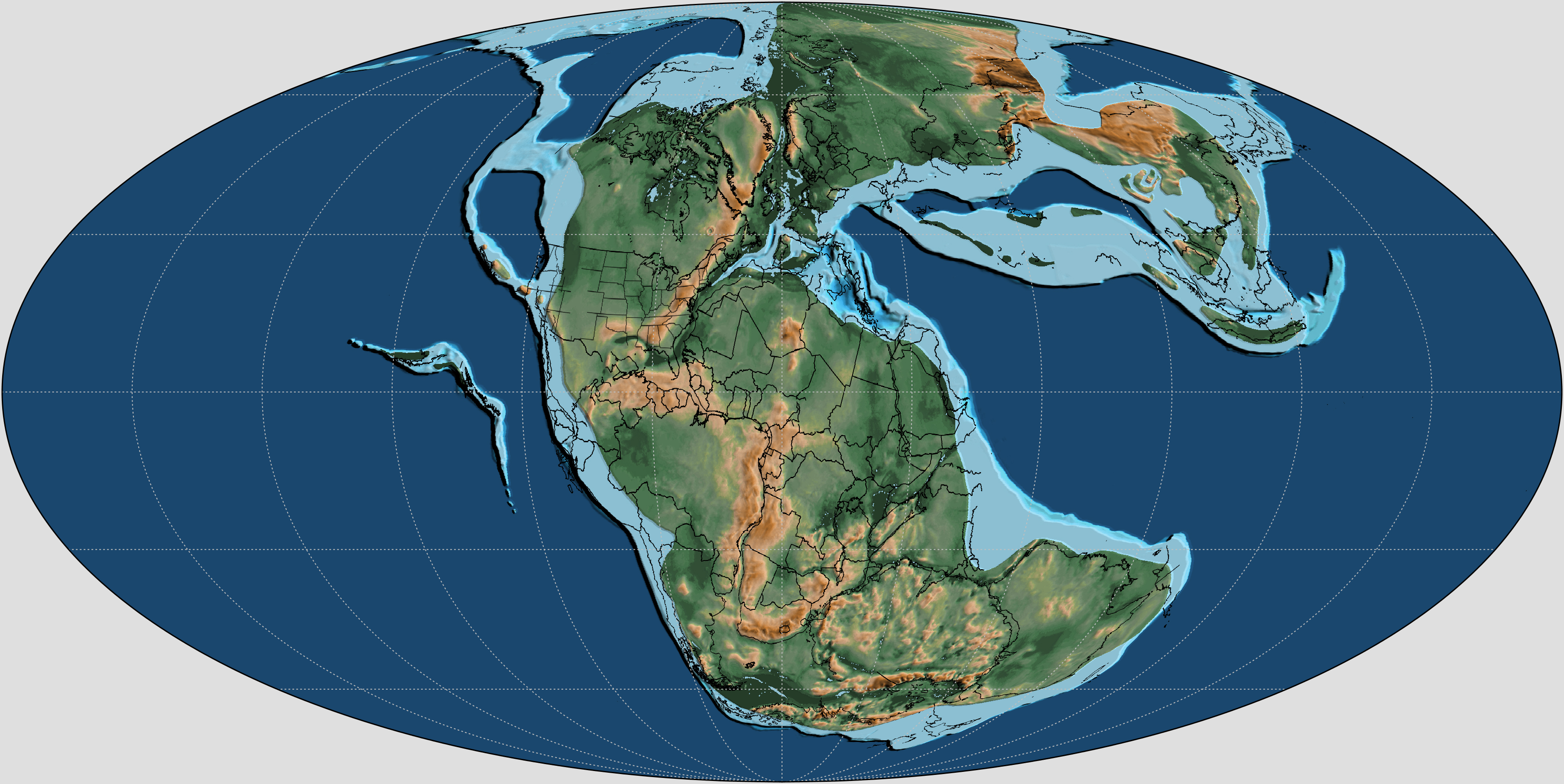
- Mollweide map of Earth 205 million years ago, with black outlines depicting countries in their locations

Chronology
← / Triassic–Jurassic extinction event; ← / Scleractinian corals & calcified sponges; ← / Carnian pluvial episode; ← / Manicouagan impact; ← / Coals return; ← / Full recovery of woody trees; ← / Smithian–Spathian boundary event; ← / Permian-Triassic extinction event
Subdivision of the Triassic according to the ICS, as of 2024. Vertical axis scale: Millions of years ago

Etymology
- Name formality: Formal

Usage information
- Celestial body: Earth
- Regional usage: Global (ICS)
- Time scale(s) used: ICS Time Scale

Definition
- Chronological unit: Age
- Stratigraphic unit: Stage
- Time span formality: Formal
- Lower boundary definition: Not formally defined
- Lower boundary definition candidates: FAD of the Conodont Misikella posthernsteini; Near FAD of the Ammonite genus Cochloceras; Near FAD of the Conodont Epigondolella mosheri; Near FAD of the Radiolarian Proparvicingula moniliformis
- Lower boundary GSSP candidate section(s): Steinbergkogel, Austria; Pignola-Abriola, Italy; Turkey; British Columbia, Canada
- Upper boundary definition: FAD of the Ammonite Psiloceras spelae tirolicum
- Upper boundary GSSP: Kuhjoch section, Karwendel mountains, Northern Calcareous Alps, Austria; 47.4839°N 11.5306°E
- Upper GSSP ratified: 2010

The Rhaetian is the latest age of the Triassic Period (in geochronology) or the uppermost stage of the Triassic System (in chronostratigraphy). It was preceded by the Norian and succeeded by the Hettangian (the lowermost stage or earliest age of the Jurassic). The base of the Rhaetian lacks a formal GSSP, though candidate sections include Steinbergkogel in Austria (since 2007) and Pignola-Abriola in Italy (since 2016). The end of the Rhaetian (and the base of the overlying Hettangian Stage) is more well defined. According to the current ICS (International Commission on Stratigraphy) system, the Rhaetian ended 201.4 ± 0.2 Ma (million years ago).

In 2010, the base of the Rhaetian (i.e. the Norian–Rhaetian boundary) was voted to be defined based on the first appearance of Misikella posthernsteini, a marine conodont. However, there is still much debate over the age of this boundary, as well as the evolution of M. posthernsteini. The most comprehensive source of precise age data for the Late Triassic comes from astrochronologically constrained terrestrial strata of the Newark basin in the eastern United States. Correlating the Newark basin to marine sections encompassing the Norian–Rhaetian boundary is mainly achieved via magnetostratigraphy, though such correlations are subject to debate and revision. Some authors have suggested that the Rhaetian lasted less than 5 million years using magnetostratigraphy from Turkish strata and a presumed gap or unconformity in Newark strata. However, both of these lines of evidence have been met with skepticism.

A commonly cited approximation of 208.5 Ma (used by the ICS from 2012 to 2023) is based on a "long-Rhaetian" hypothesis reconstructed from the Steinbergkogel GSSP candidate. Most recently, aspects of the "short-Rhaetian" hypothesis have been revived by radiometric dating of Peruvian bivalve extinctions and magnetostratigraphy at the Pignola-Abriola GSSP candidate. These studies suggest that the base of the Rhaetian was close to 205.5 Ma, and in 2024 the ICS updated the start of the Rhaetian to approximately 205.7 Ma.

During the Rhaetian, Pangaea began to break up, though the Atlantic Ocean was not yet formed.

== Stratigraphic definitions ==
The Rhaetian is named after the Rhaetian Alps, a mountain chain stretching over parts of eastern Switzerland, northern Italy and western Austria. The stage was introduced in scientific literature by Austrian geologist Eduard Suess and German paleontologist Albert Oppel in 1856.

=== Index fossils and biotic events ===
In 2010, the Triassic subcommission of the ICS voted that the base of the Rhaetian should be defined by the first appearance of the conodont Misikella posthernsteini. M. posthernsteini's direct ancestor Misikella hernsteini first appears shortly before the boundary. Around the same time is the first occurrence of the more extravagant conodont species Epigondolella mosheri (also called Mockina mosheri), which may be used as a proxy in areas where M. posthernsteini is uncommon or occurs later in time than it does elsewhere.

In the Tethyan domain (i.e. the area of the Tethys Ocean), the Sagenites reticulatus and Paracochloceras suessi ammonite biozones begin at the base of the Rhaetian. In the boreal domain (i.e. the area of the Northern ocean), the base of the Cochloceras (Paracochloceras) amoenum biozone is used instead. Extinctions at the beginning of the Rhaetian include the ammonite Metasibirites and almost all species of the large bivalve Monotis, which was abundant throughout the world in the Norian but only persisted into the Rhaetian in the form of a few miniaturized species endemic to the Tethys ocean. The Norian–Rhaetian boundary also experienced an overturn in radiolarian species, with the beginning of the Proparvicingula moniliformis biozone.

Maron et al. (2015) provided a chemostratigraphic option for defining the base of the Rhaetian at the Pignola-Abriola section. This sequence records a pronounced negative spike in δ^{13}C just before the first appearance of Misikella posthernsteini (sensu stricto) and the Proparvicingula moniliformis radiolarian zone. Rigo et al. (2020) found this same pattern in the nearby Mt Volturino and Madonna del Sirino sections, as well as the Kastelli section of Greece. They also found it in East Panthalassan sediments (Kennecott Point of British Columbia and New York Canyon of Nevada) and West Panthalassan sediments (Wombat and northern Carnarvon Basins of Australia and the Kiritehere section of New Zealand). It was construed to be related to the same event responsible for the Norian–Rhaetian extinction, which heavily impacted ammonoids, bivalves, conodonts and radiolarians. The Norian–Rhaetian extinction may have been caused by the eruption of the Angayucham large igneous province in Alaska, or the asteroid responsible for the Rochechouart impact structure in France. However, the dating of these geological events and their effects on life are uncertain at best.

=== GSSP candidates ===
The Rhaetian does not yet have an official GSSP, but two candidates have been formally proposed. Krystyn et al. (2007) proposed the Austrian Steinbergkogel section, a Norian–Rhaetian limestone sequence near Hallstatt. It records many potential Norian–Rhaetian biostratigraphic events, such as the appearance of the conodonts Misikella hernsteini and M. posthernsteini (sensu lato) and the ammonoid Paracochloceras suessi. It also record the extinction of large Monotis bivalves and the disappearance of ammonoids including Metasibirites and some Sagenites forms with lateral nodes.

A second formal GSSP candidate was not provided until Rigo et al. (2015) proposed the Pignola-Abriola section of southern Italy. This is a sequence of the Norian–Rhaetian Calcari con Selce ("Cherty limestone") Formation named after two nearby towns. It preserves a diverse array of conodonts (including the Misikella hernsteini–posthernsteini morphocline) as well as pronounced radiolarian zones.

=== Rhaetian–Hettangian boundary ===
The top of the Rhaetian (the base of the Hettangian Stage, the Lower Jurassic Series and the Jurassic System) is at the first appearance of ammonite genus Psiloceras.

In the Tethyan domain, the Rhaetian contains two ammonite biozones. The highest ammonite biozone is that of Choristoceras marshi, the lower one that of Rhabdoceras suesii. The end of this period is marked by the Triassic–Jurassic extinction event.

The GSSP marking the beginning of the Hettangian (and the end of the Rhaetian) is located at Kuhjoch, a geological section near the base of the Kendelbach Formation in Austria. This site records the first appearance of Psiloceras spelae, Cerebropollenites thiergartii (a palynomorph), Praegubkinella turgescens (a foraminifer), Cytherelloidea buisensis (an ostracod), and a positive δ^{13}C spike marking a recovery from the underlying large negative δ^{13}C spike which marks the Triassic–Jurassic extinction event.

== Duration ==
=== Norian–Rhaetian boundary: "short Rhaetian" hypotheses ===
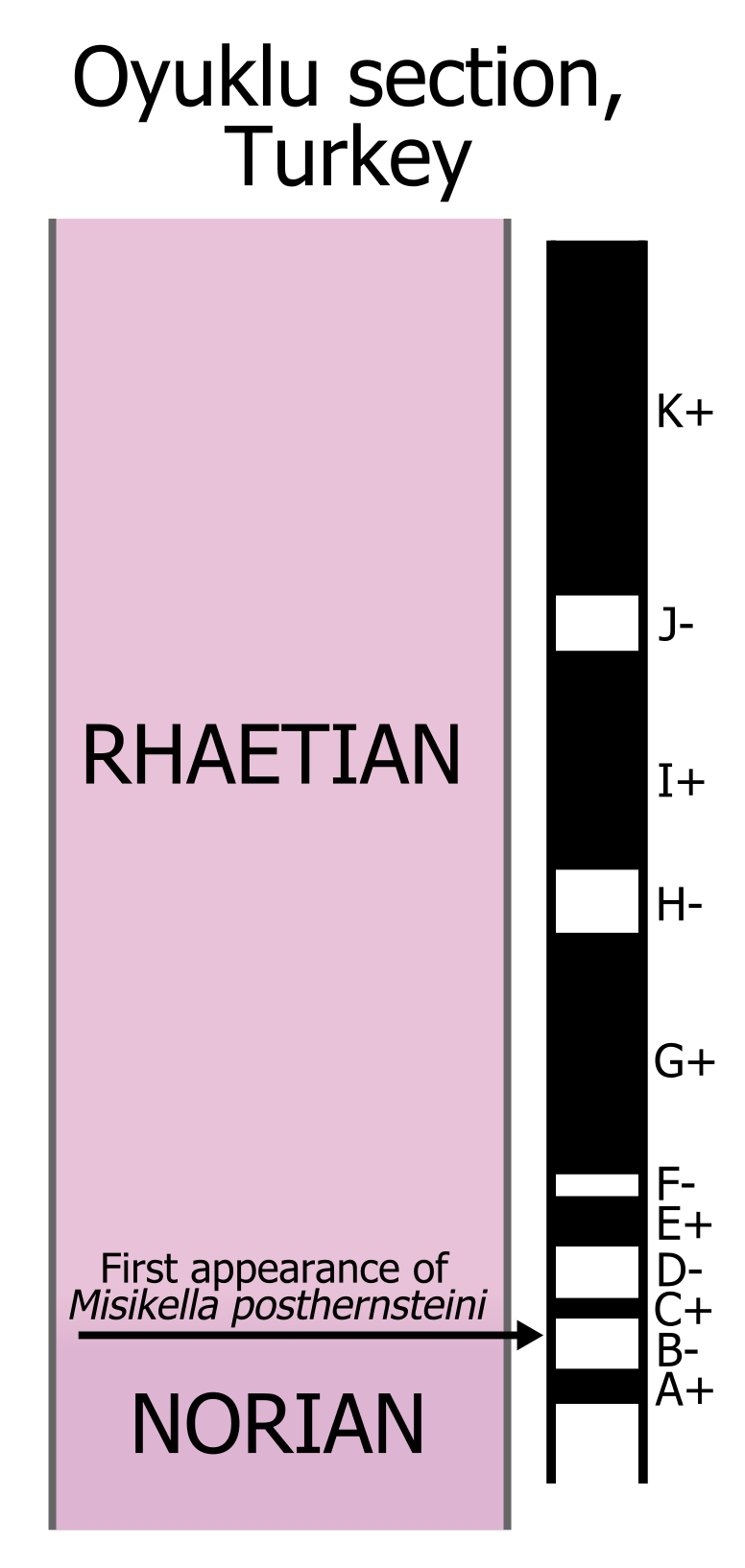
The magnetostratigraphic sequence of the Oyuklu section in Turkey, which Gallet et al. (2007) used to support a "short Rhaetian" hypothesis

Gallet et al. (2007) argued in support of a "short Rhaetian" (where the Rhaetian lasts under 5 million years) based on the Oyuklu section, a sequence from Turkey. This sequence was largely normal-polarity dominated, and presented two potential Norian–Rhaetian boundaries (since the defining biostratigraphy of the Rhaetian was not resolved at the time). Defining the boundary based on the appearance of Misikella posthernsteini placed it in a reverse-polarity section (B−) near the base of Oyuklu. Defining the boundary based on the extinction of Epigondolella bidentata placed it at magnetozone G+, the first of several major normal-polarity sections.

The early reverse-polarity zones (B− to D−) were correlated with PM11r, a reverse-polarity section at the top of Pizzo Mondello, a similar Carnian–Norian sequence in Sicily. The inferred overlap between these reverse-polarity sections was located above a normal-polarity section (A+ in Oyuklu and PM11n in Pizzo Mondello). This underlying normal-polarity section was correlated with either magnetozone E21n or E23n of the Newark sequence. Although the upper portion of Oyuklu was mostly normal, it did have a few reverse sections (H− and J−) which were at odds with the almost entirely-normal last few Triassic magnetozones of Newark.

Gallet et al. (2007) explained this by suggesting that there was a missing period of time or "hiatus" at the end of the Newark sequence, which would have resembled part of Oyuklu had it not been eroded away. If the base of Oyuklu (A+) was equivalent to E21n, then the upper half of Oyuklu would be equivalent to the Newark "hiatus", B− was equivalent to E21r, and G+ was equivalent to E23n. If A+ was instead equivalent to E23n, then practically all of Oyuklu (B− and up) would represent the hiatus. Estimating the duration of Oyuklu by comparing Pizzo Mondello with equivalent sections of Newark led Gallet et al. (2007) to the conclusion that the Rhaetian lasted only 2 million years (if the boundary was at G+) or 4.5 million years (if it was at B−).

Some biostratigraphic studies have also supported a hiatus at Newark. The conchostracan Shipingia olseni, which in Europe is found in Norian rocks, occurs in the upper portion of the Passaic Formation, the last pre-CAMP section of the Newark basin. Typical Rhaetian conchostracans such as Euestheria brodieana only appear in the last few layers of the Catharpin Creek Formation, a late Triassic unit in the Culpeper Basin which is likely equivalent to the upper Passaic formation. Palynomorph turnovers and changes in tetrapod faunas similar to Norian events in Europe have also been used to support this hypothesis. Many of the biostratigraphers who argue in favor of a Newark hiatus use similar techniques to support a "long Tuvalian" hypothesis, in which the Tuvalian (late Carnian) extends into a period of time commonly believed to be early Norian. When the International Commission on Stratigraphy updated their geologic time scale in 2012, the "short Rhaetian" and "long Tuvalian" hypotheses were equated with each other. The combined "short Rhaetian/long Tuvalian" hypothesis as described by Ogg (2012) was ultimately not chosen by the ICS when compared to its competition, which was supported by a more diverse array of methods.

=== Norian–Rhaetian boundary: "long Rhaetian" hypotheses ===
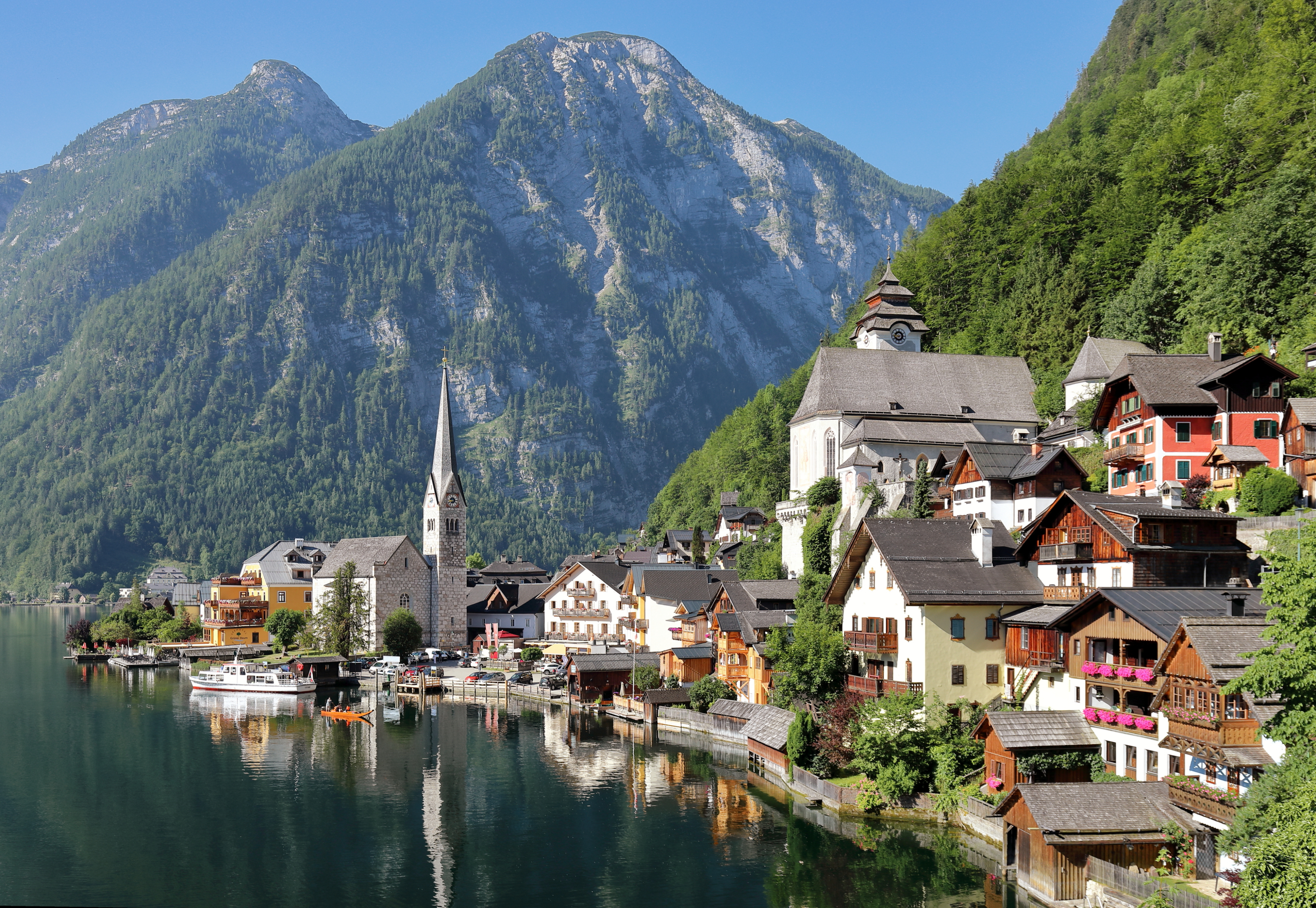
Hüsing et al. (2011) argued that the Rhaetian extended for almost 10 million years based on biomagnetostratigraphy at Steinbergkogel, a candidate GSSP near Hallstatt, Austria.

The "short Rhaetian" hypothesis has been criticized for its reliance on the assumption that a hiatus existed at Newark. This hiatus was presumed to lie within the normal polarity-dominated end of the Rhaetian, after a very short reverse polarity section (E23r) and just before the first CAMP eruptions. However, the lithology and astrochronology of Newark seem to be continuous and this precludes any assumed unconformity. In addition, the magnetic signature of at the end of Newark basin has been found worldwide, with sequences in Morocco, Nova Scotia, Italy, the UK and possibly Turkey all preserving E23r-equivalent magnetozones underlying the Rhaetian–Hettangian boundary. It would be very improbable for all of these sites of varying geology and deposition rates to experience an unconformity erasing an equivalent amount of time. Kent, Olsen & Muttoni (2017) additionally found convincing correlations between the magnetozones of the upper Passaic Formation and Rhaetian strata in England. They suggest that the apparent delay between Newark and Europe fauna and flora may instead be biogeographic differences due to climatic variation over time and latitude, a factor which has manifested at other points in the Triassic.

Various studies have supported a "long Rhaetian" hypothesis (where the Rhaetian lasts 5–10 million years) based on magnetostratigraphy. Muttoni et al. (2010) studied a pair of Triassic sequences in northern Italy: the Norian–Rhaetian Brumano section and the Rhaetian–Hettangian Italcementi section. In Brumano, M. posthernsteini first appeared quite a distance below the oldest reported magnetozone, BIT1n, which was correlated with E20n at Newark. The opposite is true in Pizzo Mondello, where M. posthersteini appears above the youngest complete magnetozone, PM12n (equivalent to E17n at Newark). This suggests that the Norian–Rhaetian boundary lies in the range of Newark magnetozones E17r to E19r, or 207-210 Ma. The authors expressed skepticism towards the substantial overlap between Oyuklu and Pizzo Mondello proposed by Gallet et al. (2007). Hounslow & Muttoni (2010) elaborated on this sentiment and correlated section A+ of Oyuklu with PM12n of Pizzo Mondello, indicating that the overlap between the two sections was very narrow. They also noted that a thrust fault at Oyuklu artificially lengthens B−, the magnetozone containing the Norian–Rhaetian boundary at that section. Ikeda & Tada (2014) provided an astrochronologically constrained chert sequence in Japan which suggested that the Norian–Rhaetian boundary occurred 208.5 ± 0.3 Ma, based on the extinction of the Norian radiolarian Betraccium deweveri.

Hüsing et al. (2011) was a prominent study arguing in favor of a long Rhaetian. This was based on biostratigraphy and magnetostratigraphy of the Steinbergkogel section in Austria, which is a candidate GSSP for the base of the Rhaetian. They proposed two options for defining the base of the Rhaetian, either at the first occurrence of Misikella hernsteini or the first appearance datum of Misikella posthernsteini (sensu lato). At Steinbergkogel, M. hernsteini first occurred at the top of a normal-polarity section while M. posthernsteini (sensu lato) first appeared at the base of a shorter overlying reverse-polarity section. These sections were correlated with magnetozones E16n and E16r of the Newark Basin. Hüsing et al. (2011) preferred to define the Rhaetian based on M. hernsteini, and estimated a date for the Norian–Rhaetian boundary of 209.8 Ma based on that of Newark's magnetozone E16n. However, the ICS Triassic subcommission had already voted in 2010 to certify the first appearance of M. posthernsteini as the defining event for the base of the Rhaetian. Partially inspired by the work of Hüsing et al. (2011), the ICS's 2012 Geologic Time Scale utilized a tentative 208.5 Ma date for the Norian–Rhaetian boundary. This date has been retained in ICS time scales as of 2020.

=== Norian–Rhaetian boundary: Recent compromises ===
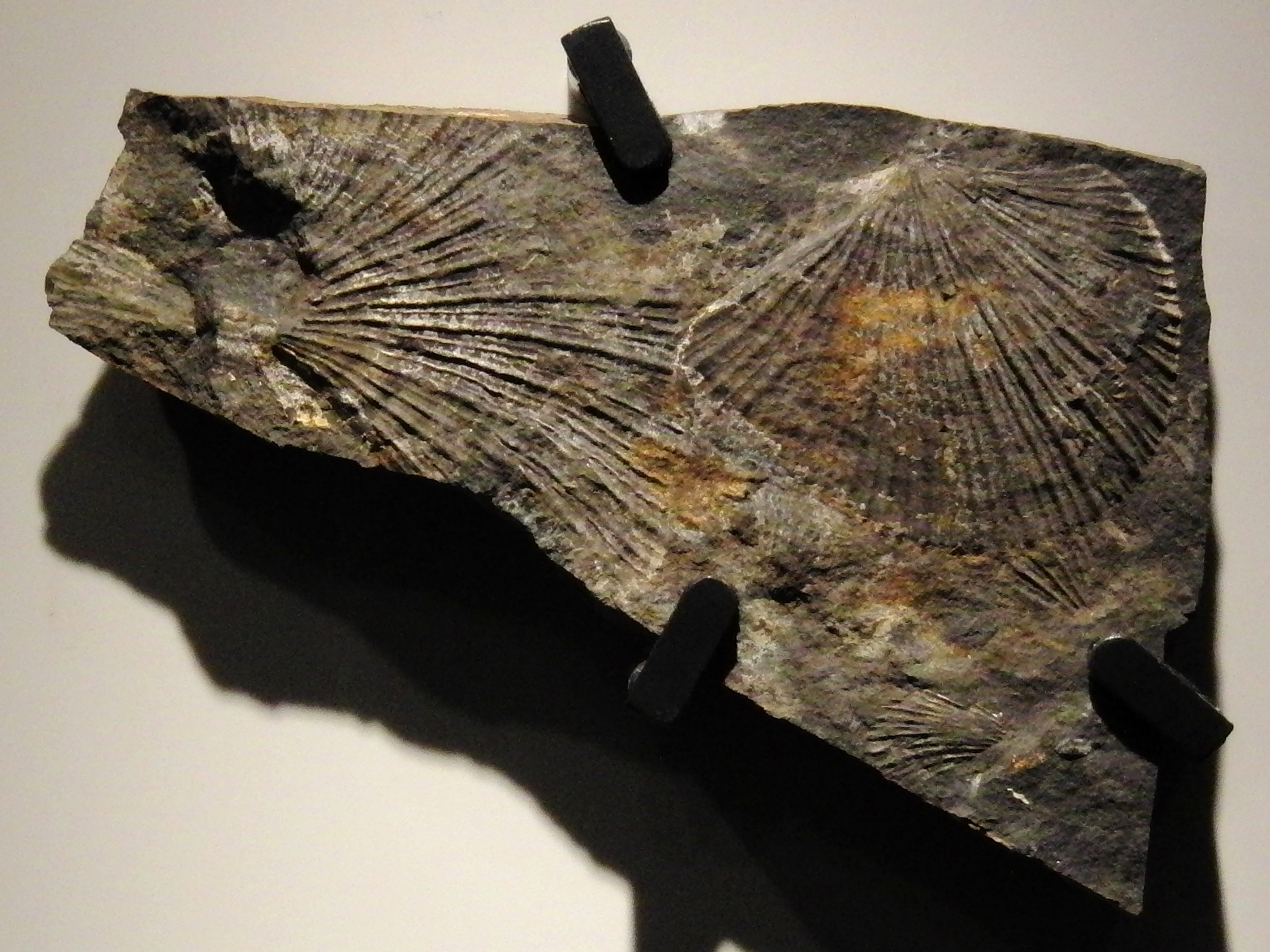
Wotzlaw et al. (2014) radiometrically dated the Norian–Rhaetian boundary to ~205.50 Ma based on the extinction of Monotis in Peru.

The Norian–Rhaetian boundary was finally provided with radiometric dating in a study by Wotzlaw et al. (2014). They studied a sequence of the Aramachay Formation in Peru which records the extinction of large Monotis bivalves. This prominent biotic event is closely associated with the Norian–Rhaetian boundary. The last Monotis specimens lie between ash beds which are uranium-lead (U–Pb) dated to 205.70 ± 0.15 Ma and 205.30 ± 0.14 Ma. This allowed them to conclude that the Norian–Rhaetian boundary occurred somewhere between these ash beds, 205.50 ± 0.35 Ma. This date corresponds to "short-Rhaetian" predictions, but Wotzlaw et al. (2014) also agreed with "long-Rhaetian" proponents who argued that there was no good evidence for a hiatus in the Newark Basin sequence. Wotzlaw et al. (2014) estimated that the Norian–Rhaetian boundary was concurrent with a lengthy reverse polarity section (E20r.2r) of Newark magnetozone E20. Golding et al. (2016) utilized U–Pb dating at a part of the Black Bear Ridge section of British Columbia which is considered early Rhaetian based on its conodont fauna. Their estimated 205.2 ± 0.9 Ma date for this early Rhaetian section agrees with the results of Wotzlaw et al. (2014).

This compromise between "short-Rhaetian" and "long-Rhaetian" hypotheses has been supported by other studies. Maron et al. (2015) elaborated on the dating of an upcoming GSSP candidate for the Rhaetian in the form of the Pignola-Abriola section in Southern Italy. This section recorded the Norian–Rhaetian boundary as tracked by the first occurrence of Misikella posthernsteini, the base of the Proparvicingula moniliformis radiolarian zone, and a prominent negative δ^{13}C anomaly. Magnetostratigraphy correlated MPA5r (the Pignola-Abriola magnetozone surrounding the Norian–Rhaetian boundary) with the early part of Newark's E20. This provided an estimated date of 205.7 Ma for the Norian–Rhaetian boundary, very similar to Wotzlaw et al. (2014)'s estimate.

Some controversy over the date of the Norian–Rhaetian boundary has resulted from differing interpretations of the conodont used to define it, Misikella posthernsteini. Paleontologists working on the Pignola-Abriola GSSP candidate have argued that the early M. posthernsteini specimens present at Steinbergkogel are actually an older transitional form (M. posthernsteini sensu lato) which lies between M. hernsteini and M. posthernsteini in the evolution of Triassic conodonts. The Pignola-Abriola form (M. posthernsteini sensu stricto) is considered morphologically more similar to the original fossils of the species, described from Slovakia in 1974. This debate has led some biostratigraphers to suggest avoiding the use of conodonts in Triassic chronostratigraphy altogether, a proposal which itself has been criticized by Triassic conodont specialists. Writing on behalf of the ICS, Ogg (2016) stated that there were two possible dates for the Norian–Rhaetian boundary: 209.5 Ma (using M. posthernsteini sensu lato and Steinbergkogel as a GSSP) or 205.8 Ma (using M. posthernsteini sensu stricto and Pignola-Abriola as a GSSP).

A recent update of Newark stratigraphy by Kent, Olsen & Muttoni (2017) combined magnetostratigraphy with astrochronology to form the longest astrochronostratigraphic polarity time scale (APTS) known in the fossil record. The Newark sequence was affected by astrochronological (Milankovitch) cycles as recorded by climate-induced changes in lake depth and geology, although depositional rate is remarkably consistent within the Newark basin. The most consistent and regular of these cycles are 405,000-year cycles known as McLaughlin cycles. By tracing McLaughlin cycles backwards from the radiometrically dated CAMP basalts, the boundaries between each formation and magnetozone in the Newark sequence could be assigned a precise age. Magnetozone E20r.2r lasted from 206.03 to 204.65 Ma according to this method, suggesting that the Rhaetian began ~205.5 Ma. This agrees with the dates for the Norian–Rhaetian boundary obtained by Wotzlaw et al. (2014) and Maron et al. (2015). The accuracy of the Newark APTS has been supported by Li et al. (2017), who found astrochronological and magnetostratigraphic signatures in the Xujiahe Formation of China practically identical to those of the Newark sequence.

=== Rhaetian–Hettangian boundary ===
The end date of the Rhaetian currently in use by the ICS (201.4 ±0.2 Ma) is based on a study by Schoene et al. (2010) involving ammonite-bearing strata in Peru. They used CA-ID-TIMS uranium–lead dating to date ash beds slightly below and slightly above the first appearance of Psiloceras in the Pucará Basin. The overlying ash bed was dated to 201.29 ±0.16 Ma while the underlying was 201.36 ±0.13 Ma. This allowed the first appearance of Psiloceras to be given a date of 201.31 ±0.18/0.43 Ma (assuming minimum/maximum uncertainty).

Blackburn et al. (2013) instead estimated a slightly older end date. They used a combination of radiometric dates and astrochronology (via Triassic Milankovitch cycles) to constrain the end-Triassic extinction to 201.564 ±0.015/0.22 Ma. The biostratigraphically defined Triassic–Jurassic (Rhaetian–Hettangian) boundary is considered to lie approximately 60,000–140,000 years after the extinction by most sources, and therefore the Rhaetian ended in the range of 201.5 to 201.4 Ma under the methodology of Blackburn et al. (2013).

== Notable formations ==
- Lower Elliot Formation (South Africa)
- Exter Formation (Norian–Rhaetian) (Germany)
- 'Grès infraliasiques' Formation (Saint-Nicolas-de-Port, France)
- Penarth Group (England and Wales, UK)

== See also ==
- Triassic–Jurassic extinction
- Rhaetian sandstone
