= Pliensbachian =

Third age of the Early Jurassic

- 192.9 ± 0.3 – 184.2 ± 0.3 Ma

Chronology
← / Triassic–Jurassic extinction event
Subdivision of the Jurassic according to the ICS, as of 2024. Vertical axis scale: Millions of years ago

Etymology
- Name formality: Formal

Usage information
- Celestial body: Earth
- Regional usage: Global (ICS)
- Time scale(s) used: ICS Time Scale

Definition
- Chronological unit: Age
- Stratigraphic unit: Stage
- Time span formality: Formal
- Lower boundary definition: FAD of the Ammonite species Bifericeras donovani and genus Apoderoceras
- Lower boundary GSSP: Robin Hood's Bay, Yorkshire, England, UK; 54.4069°N 0.4975°W
- Lower GSSP ratified: March 2005
- Upper boundary definition: Peniche, Portugal
- Upper boundary GSSP: FAD of the Ammonite D. (E.) simplex 39.3708°N 9.3853°W
- Upper GSSP ratified: 2014

The Pliensbachian is an age of the geologic timescale and stage in the stratigraphic column. It is part of the Early or Lower Jurassic Epoch or Series and spans the time between 192.9 ±0.3 Ma and 184.2 ±0.3 Ma (million years ago). The Pliensbachian is preceded by the Sinemurian and followed by the Toarcian.

The Pliensbachian ended with the extinction event called the Toarcian turnover. During the Pliensbachian, the middle part of the Lias was deposited in Europe. The Pliensbachian is roughly coeval with the Charmouthian regional stage of North America.

== Stratigraphic definitions ==
The Pliensbachian takes its name from the hamlet of Pliensbach in the community of Zell unter Aichelberg in the Swabian Alb, some 30 km east of Stuttgart in Germany. The name was introduced into scientific literature by German palaeontologist Albert Oppel in 1858.

The base of the Pliensbachian is at the first appearances of the ammonite species Bifericeras donovani and genera Apoderoceras and Gleviceras. The Wine Haven profile near Robin Hood's Bay (Yorkshire, England) has been appointed as global reference profile for the base (GSSP).

The top of the Pliensbachian (the base of the Toarcian Stage) is at the first appearance of ammonite genus Eodactylites.

=== Biostratigraphy ===
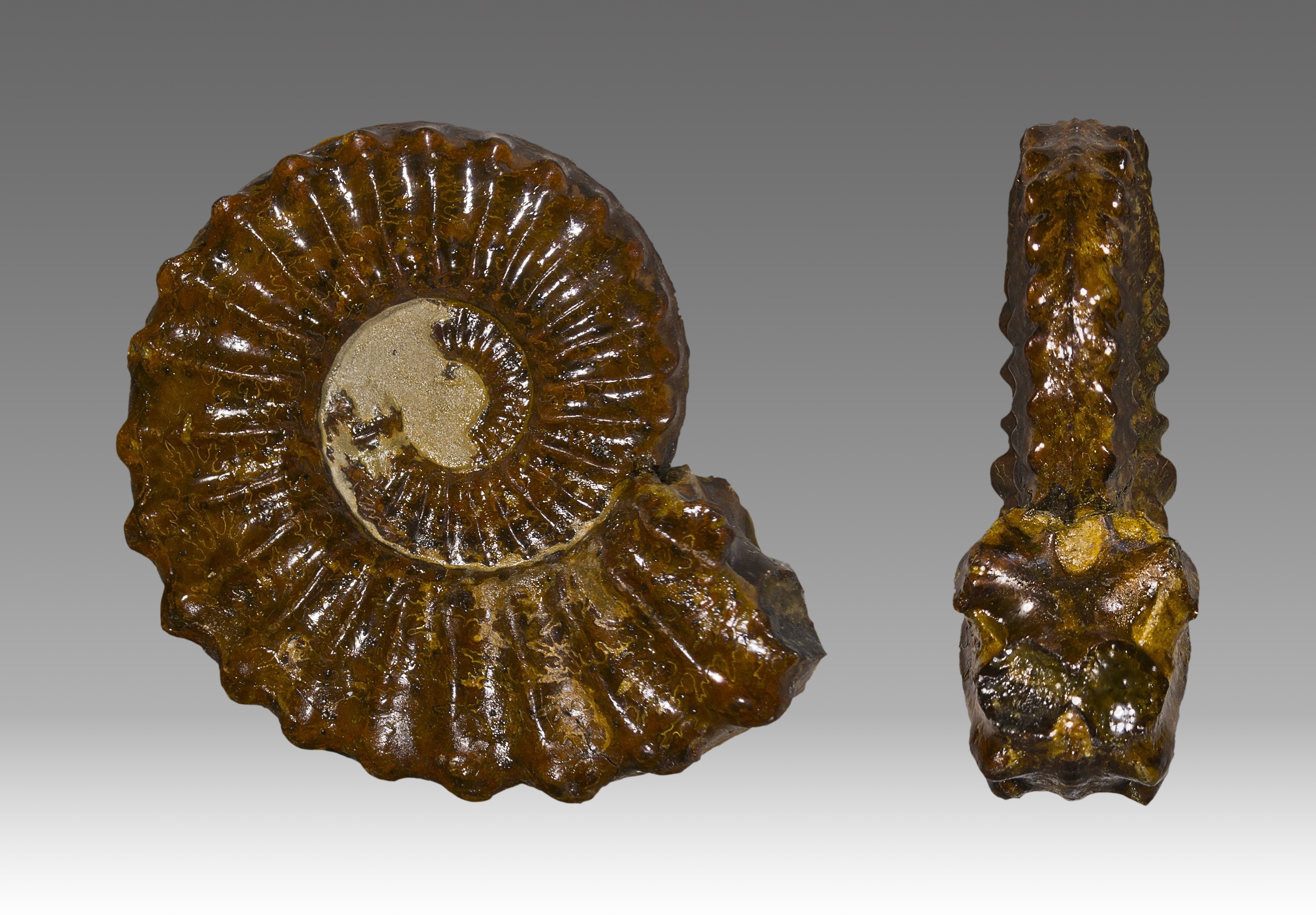
Pleuroceras spinatum from Lanuéjols, Gard, France

The Pliensbachian contains five ammonite biozones in the boreal domain:

- zone of Pleuroceras spinatum
- zone of Amaltheus margaritatus
- zone of Prodactylioceras davoei
- zone of Tragophylloceras ibex
- zone of Uptonia jamesoni

In the Tethys domain, the Pliensbachian contains six biozones:

- zone of Emaciaticeras emaciatum
- zone of Arieticeras algovianum
- zone of Fuciniceras lavinianum
- zone of Prodactylioceras davoei
- zone of Tragophylloceras ibex
- zone of Uptonia jamesoni
