= Leonard Frank Spath =

British geologist (1882–1957)

- Born: 20 October 1882
- Died: 2 March 1957 (aged 75)
- Education: Birkbeck College
- Awards: FRS (1940); Lyell Medal (1945)
- Scientific career
- Fields: Geology
- Workplaces: British Museum; University of London

Leonard Frank Spath FRS (20 October 1882 – 2 March 1957) was a British geologist specialising in malacology and ammonitology.

Spath Creek on Ellesmere Island is named after him, and indirectly the Spathian substage of the Early Triassic epoch.

== Education ==
Spath gained a Bachelor of Science degree in geology at Birkbeck College in 1912 and obtained employment at the British Museum as an assistant curator in the geology department. He undertook two geology field trips, to Tunisia and Newfoundland, around that time which he used as an opportunity to collect fossils. He later gained a Doctor of Science degree from the University of London and was a lecturer in Geology at Birkbeck, University of London.

== Awards and honours ==
Spath was elected a Fellow of the Royal Society (FRS) in 1940, his certificate of election reads:

Attached to the Department of Geology in the British Museum (Nat Hist) for research on the fossil Cephalopoda (Ammonoids and Nautiloids) and the arrangement of that collection; and generally consulted by palaeontologists and Institutions for identifying fossils in these groups. Distinguished for his original studies of Mesozoic Ammonites, in which subject he is the leading authority. Has formulated original and clarifying theories of the phylogenetic relations of the Cephalopoda in general and of the Jurassic and Cretaceous ammonites in particular. His work has resulted in many important elucidations of inter-continental stratigraphical correlation and has done much to advance precise geological knowledge. Author of important monographs on Jurassic Cephalopoda of Cutch ('Palaeontologica Indica', 1927) and the Ammonoidea of the Gault of England (Palaeontographical Society); also the Jurassic and Liassic Ammonites (British Museum Catalogue, 1934 and 1938). Has published more than 100 papers and monographs.

Spath won the prestigious annual scientific Lyell Medal given by the Geological Society of London in 1945. The Spath Crest, a feature of the Du Toit Nunataks in the Shackleton Range of Antarctic is named after him.
