= Coimbra Group (geology) =

Geological formation in Portugal

- Stratigraphic range: Sinemurian-Pliensbachian 199–188 Ma
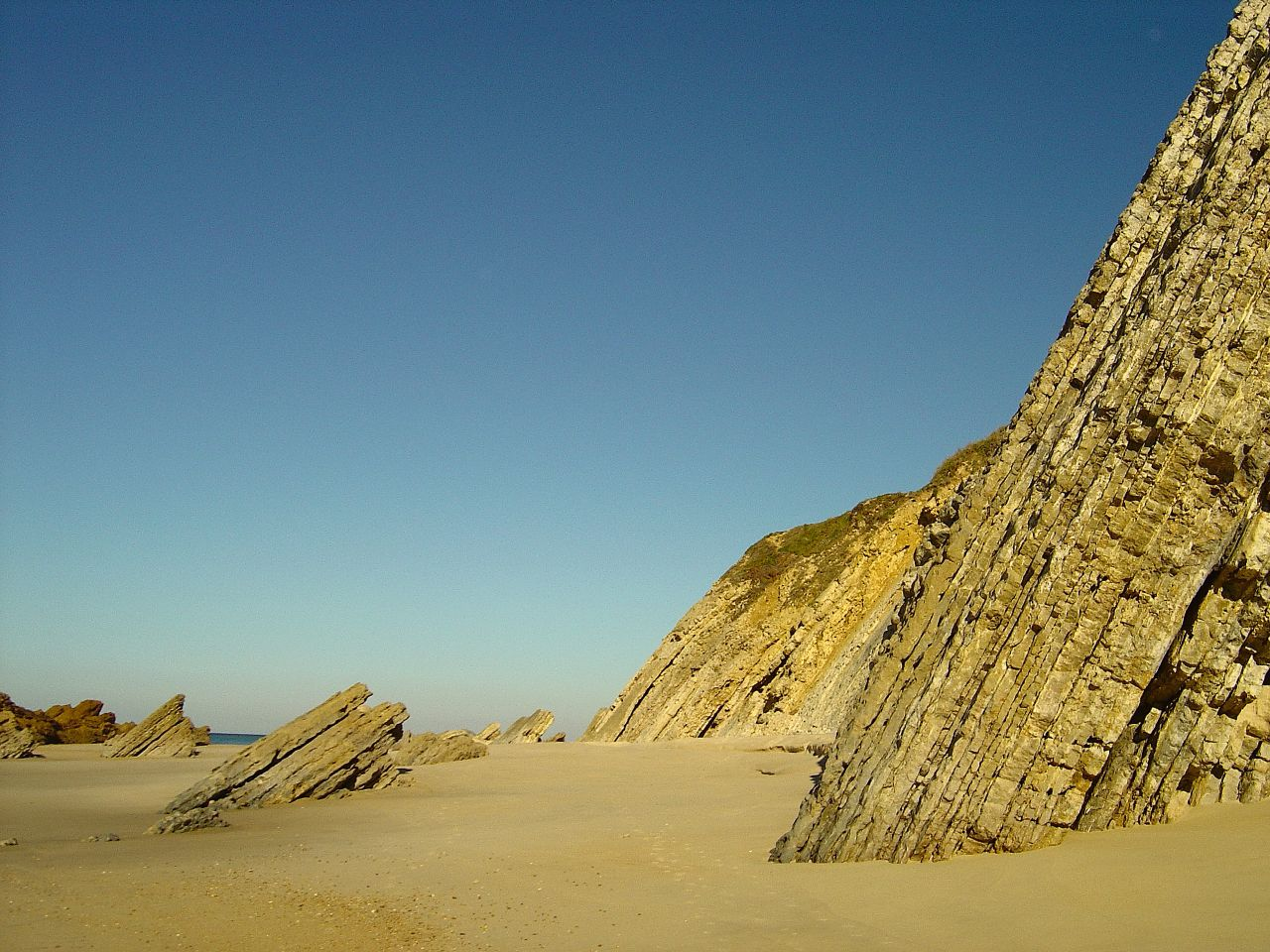
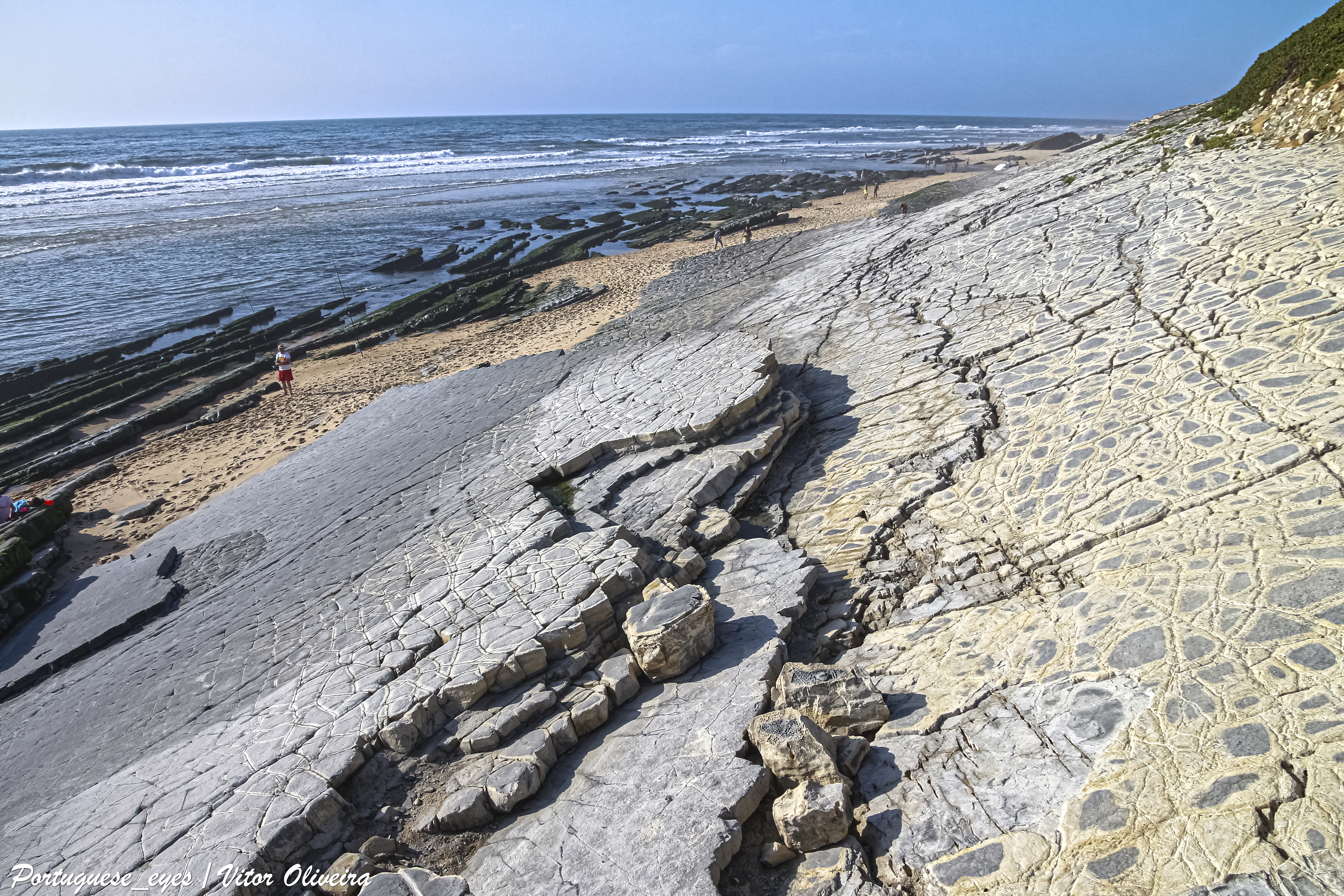
- S. Pedro de Muel Beach, main Coimbra Formation outcrop Praia de Água de Madeiros, main outcrop of the formation
- Type: Geological formation
- Sub-units: Coimbra Formation (Vila Seca Member & Casa do Sal Member); Água de Madeiros Formation (Polvoeira Mb & Praia da Pedra Mb)
- Underlies: Vale das Fontes Formation
- Overlies: Dagorda Formation; Pereiros Formation
- Area: Lusitanian Basin
- Thickness: 120-150 m

Lithology
- Primary: Limestones

Location
- Location: Coimbra Region
- Coordinates: 39.8° N, 9.0° W
- Region: Lusitanian Basin
- Country: Portugal

Type section
- Named for: The Village of Coimbra
- Named by: Dimuccio, Duarte & Cunha
- Thickness at type section: ~120 m (390 ft)
- Coimbra Group (geology) (Portugal)

The Coimbra Group (Also known as Camadas de Coimbra or Calcários de S. Miguel) is a geological group of Sinemurian-Pliensbachian (Lower Jurassic) age in the Lusitanian Basin of Portugal. The unit is made of the Coimbra & the Água de Madeiros Fms, that represent a series of peritidal to intertidal facies of a Carbonate platform mostly of Obtusum-Ibex age, that gradually evolve to open marine/hemipelagic units Vale das Fontes Formation and Lemede formation. This unit is known for its fossil content, including Invertertebrate and vertebrate ichnofossils and fossils. The group wasn´t named until 2014.

== Description ==
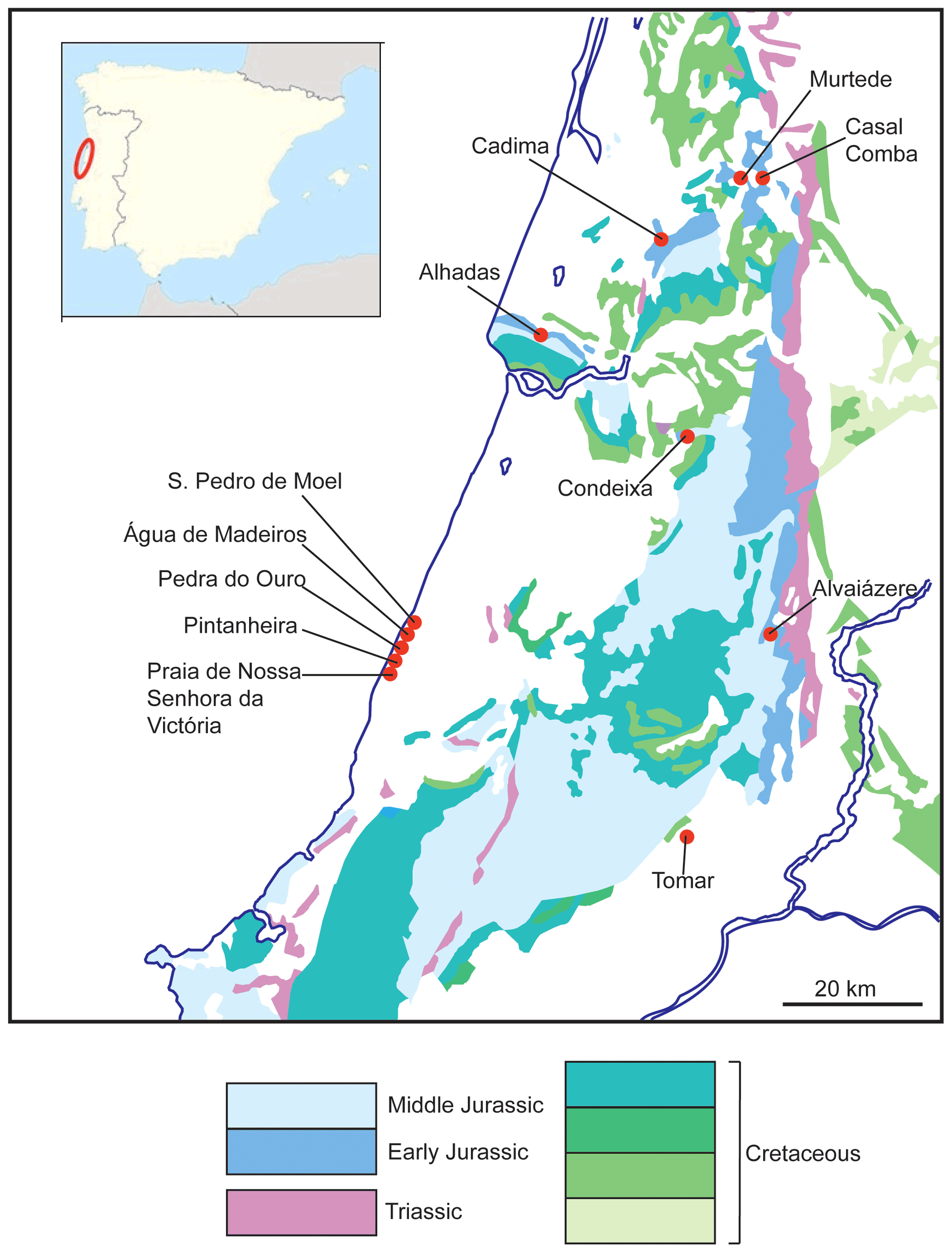
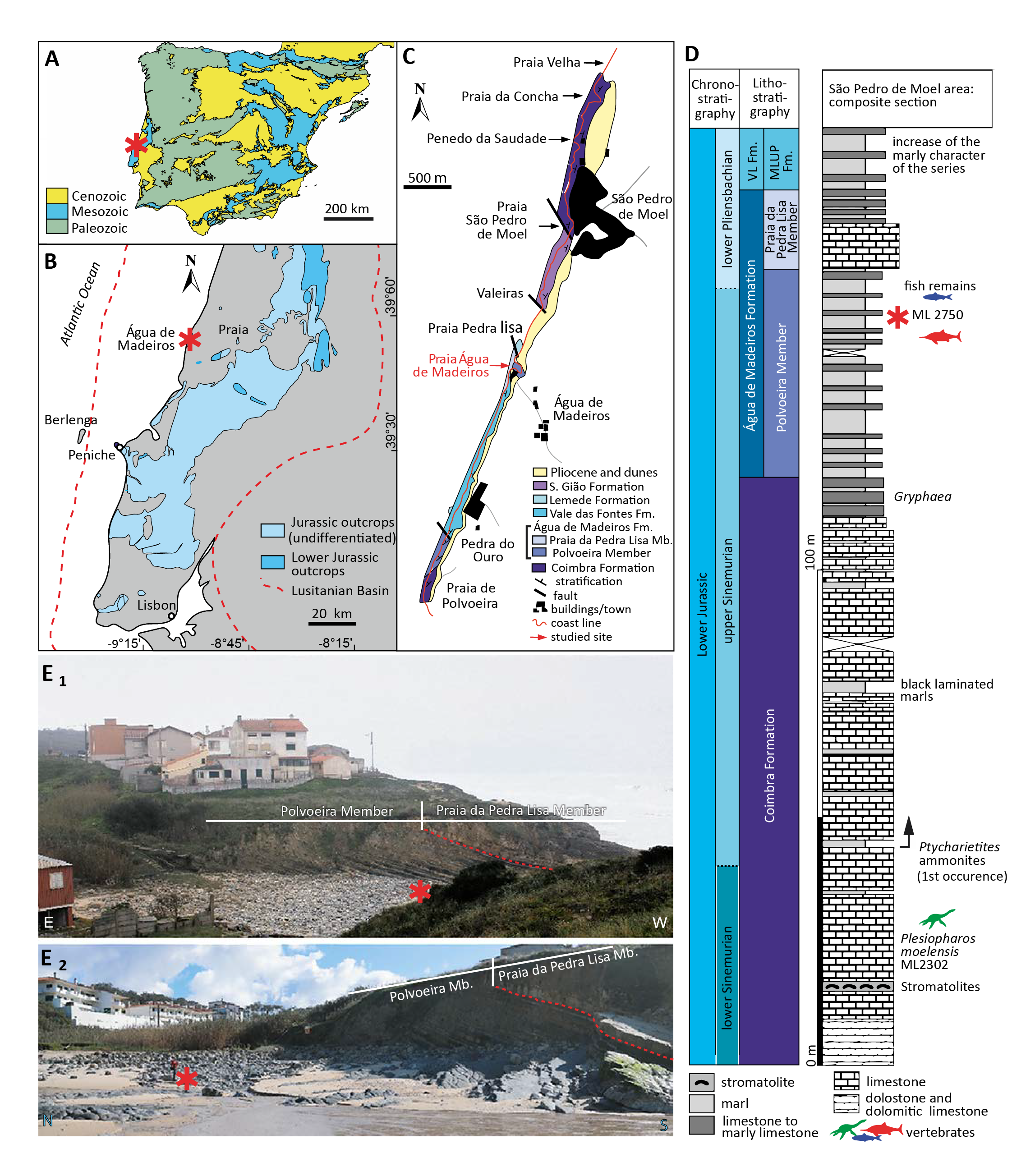
A) Map of Jurassic Sedimens in the Lusitanian Basin, along documented localities where ichthyosaur fossils have been uncovered (locations along the coast are Early Jurassic) B) Geological map of the W Iberian Peninsula, with closeup of outcropping rock units, synthetic stratigraphic column of the Lower Jurassic of São Pedro de Moel and panoramic views of the outcrops and units of the Água de Madeiros Formation in Praia de Água de Madeiros

The Coimbra Formation, has a diverse lithological composition, characterized by the predominance of carbonates and a varied stratigraphic succession. The unit has a wide distribution within the Lusitanian Basin, with an approximate thickness of 60±20 m in the Coimbra-Penela region.

The lithology of the Coimbra Formation is marked by alternating massive pelites and dolomites, which vary in purity and sedimentary structure. The dolomites come in different forms, including crystalline, micritic, oolitic and bioclastic varieties, and are often interlayered with marly pelites and ferruginous dolomites. In addition, calco-dolomitic breccias and dolomitic sandstones occur, often biodetrital, reflecting complex sedimentary dynamics.

The formation can be subdivided into two main members: the Vila Seca Member and the Casa do Sal Member. The Vila Seca Member is characterized by a succession of dolomitic sandstones interspersed with impure dolomicrites and calco-dolomitic breccias. There are also strata of pelites and marly claystones, showing a variety of depositional processes, including evaporitic conditions and episodes of bioturbation. At the top of this member, there are discontinuity surfaces with signs of micropaleocarsification and temporary subaerial exposure. The Casa do Sal Member is distinguished by the occurrence of massive microcrystalline dolomites interspersed with laminated black pelites. The lithology suggests more stable depositional conditions, with alternating low-energy carbonate environments and episodes of more siliciclastic sedimentation. The transition between the two members is marked by an important stratigraphic discontinuity.

The stratigraphy of the Coimbra Formation is complex due to the interdigitation with lithological units of the Pereiros Formation. The lower contact is characterized by a gradational transition from sandstones and claystones to fossiliferous chalcodolomites, while the upper limit is defined by a clear lithological change to supercurrent calcareous-marginal units. The formation shows processes of dolomitization penecontemporaneous to deposition and later phases of dedolomitization, conditioned by local tectonic structures.

Faciological analysis allowed the unit to be subdivided into six main lithic groups (U1-U6), identified on the basis of field stratigraphy and lateral variation of the lithofacies. This differentiation reveals a sedimentary evolution controlled by paleogeographic and diagenetic conditions, reflecting a succession of depositional environments from shallow marine to restricted evaporitic environments.

The Água de Madeiros Formation is stratigraphically positioned above the Coimbra Formation and is divided into two members: Polvoeira Member (lower section) & Praia da Pedra Lisa Member (upper section).

The Polvoeira Member, particularly around São Pedro de Moel, consists of alternating layers of marls and marly limestones that progressively become richer in clay. A notable feature of this section is the presence of organic-rich black shales, which suggest deposition in a low-energy, oxygen-poor marine setting under a warm, arid climate. These conditions favored the preservation of organic material, making these layers of interest for hydrocarbon research. The Polvoeira Member represents a period of increasing clay deposition and organic accumulation, suggesting more restricted and anoxic conditions in the Lusitanian Basin during the Early Jurassic. The diversity of marine fossils provides valuable insights into ecological changes and the evolution of benthic communities in this transitional paleoenvironment.

Above this unit, the Praia da Pedra Lisa Member represents a more carbonate-dominated interval, best observed at Água de Madeiros. This member begins with approximately 9 meters of thinly bedded mudstones and wackestones, often laminated and enriched in microfossils. Larger marine organisms are less common in this section, though ammonites and trace fossils are present. Towards the top, the deposits show an increasing influence of marl, with dark grey marly intervals becoming more frequent alongside thickening limestone beds. Some of these marls contain a high concentration of organic matter, suggesting conditions that may have been periodically low in oxygen.

== Paleoenvironment ==
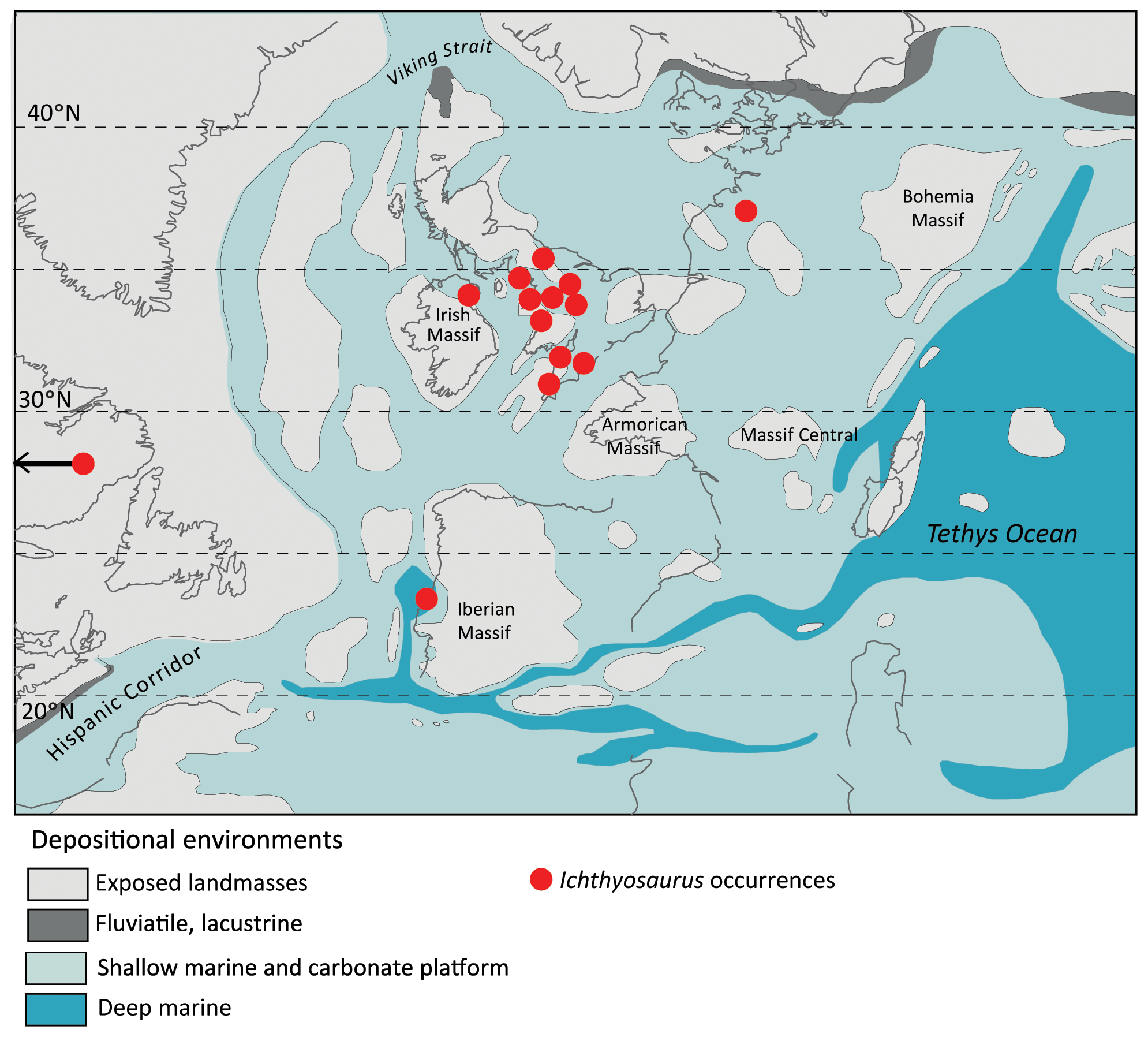
Paleogeography of the Sinemurian-Pliensbachian Europe+N Gondwana, with Ichthyosaurus sites. Red Point in Portugal marks the Coimbra specimens.

The sediments in the Coimbra Formation represent the shallow sections of an inner carbonate platform, adjacent to the Paleozoic basement in the E. They are rich in organic matter and are found alongside marl layers in a shallow marine setting. The organic material is divided into three groups (A, B, and C), showing how it is spread across different layers. The middle section mainly consists of group B, with a lot of microbial mat particles and very few plant particles. This layer has the highest level of Total organic carbon (TOC), indicating it was deposited in a restricted and stagnant area with little water movement. In the upper section, all three groups (A, B, and C) are present. The lower part of this section contains more plant debris and fewer marine particles, suggesting a stronger influence from land and more oxygen in the environment, leading to lower TOC levels. As we move up, group B shows a reduced land influence. At the top, group A takes over, with more marine particles and fewer plant materials, suggesting a transition to a more open marine environment. Overall is made up of shallow marine deposits formed in a low-energy setting, with occasional stronger events like storms or floods. The area was a calm, shallow marine environment with limited water flow. Most sediments were fine-grained, showing low-energy conditions and a semi-arid climate. Microbialites formed during periods of slow sediment buildup, indicating low water movement. Occasional storms brought better oxygenated water, supporting brief marine life bursts. Fossils suggest shifts between restricted and open marine environments due to minor sea-level changes. Over time, open-marine conditions increased, with more typical marine fossils reflecting a significant rise in sea level. Individual Stromatolite mounds are clearly defined, either as separate structures lined up next to each other or as irregular, flat to wavy layers that merge at the base. Palynology includes Classopollis (Cheirolepidiaceae Conifer) and Botryococcus as the dominant continental components, while marine palynomorphs include the genera Tasmanites and Cymathiosphaera (Prasinophyte algae) as well Zygnemataceae. The recent discovery of Dinosaur tracks revelated the presence of supratidal environments located in a shallow, tropical coastal area, likely near the shore.

The Água de Madeiros Formation represents a marine deepening trend during the Early Jurassic. The Polvoeira Member begins with a shallow, well-oxygenated environment, rich in benthic life, but transitions to deeper waters with increasing clay content and nektonic fossils, indicating a shift towards lower oxygen conditions. Periodic black shale layers suggest episodes of restricted circulation and organic accumulation. The Praia da Pedra Lisa Member reflects a more offshore, deeper setting, with scarce benthic fauna and an abundance of ostracods, radiolarians, and nektonic species like ammonites. The presence of laminated, organic-rich marls indicates fluctuating oxygen levels and reduced water movement. Overall, this formation records a progressive sea-level rise in the Lusitanian Basin, transitioning from a carbonate shelf to a deeper, clay-influenced marine environment.

== Fossil Content ==
Color key: Taxon / Reclassified taxon / Taxon falsely reported as present / Dubious taxon or junior synonym / Ichnotaxon / Ootaxon / Morphotaxon	Notes; Uncertain or tentative taxa are in small text; ~~crossed out~~ taxa are discredited.

=== Mollusca ===
Genus	Species	Location	Formation	Material	Notes	Images
Asteroceras	A. spp.	Sao Pedro de Muel	Coimbra	Isolated shells	An Ammonite of the family Asteroceratidae	Reconstruction
Boehmiola	B. exilis	Sao Pedro de Muel; Almaroz (SGP Collection)	Coimbra; Água de Madeiros	Isolated shells	A Gastropod of the family Ceritellidae	
Camptonectes	C. subulatus	Pedra do Ouro	Coimbra	Isolated shells	A Bivalve of the family Pectinidae	
Ceratomya	C. cf. petricosa	Sao Pedro de Muel	Coimbra	Isolated shells	A Bivalve of the family Ceratomyidae	
Cardinia	C. listeri	Pedra do Ouro	Água de Madeiros	Isolated shells	A Bivalve of the family Carditidae	
Cryptaenia	C. sp.	Almaroz (SGP Collection)	Água de Madeiros	Isolated shells	A Gastropod of the family Ptychomphalidae	
Cyclostomaria	C. aff. monarii	Pedra do Ouro	Água de Madeiros	Isolated shells	A Gastropod of the family Pleurotomariidae	
Cylindrobulla	C. sp.	Praia Velha	Água de Madeiros	Isolated shells	A Gastropod of the family Cylindrobullinidae	
Entolium	E. lunare	Pedra do Ouro	Água de Madeiros	Isolated shells	A Bivalve of the family Entoliidae	
Eoderoceras	E. armatum	Água de Madeiros; Pedra do Ouro	Água de Madeiros	Isolated shells	An Ammonite of the family Eoderoceratidae	
Epideroceras	E. lorioli	Água de Madeiros; Pedra do Ouro	Água de Madeiros	Isolated shells	An Ammonite of the family Phricodoceratidae	
Epophioceroides	E. apertus; E. spp.	Sao Pedro de Muel	Coimbra	Isolated shells	An Ammonite of the family Asteroceratidae	
Eucycloscala	E. sp.	Pedra do Ouro	Água de Madeiros	Isolated shells	A Gastropod of the family Eucycloscalidae	
Gagaticeras	G. spp.	Sao Pedro de Muel	Coimbra	Isolated shells	An Ammonite of the family Echioceratidae	
Grammatodon	G. sp.	Pedra do Ouro	Água de Madeiros	Isolated shells	A Bivalve of the family Parallelodontidae	
Gryphaea	G. arcuata; G. mccullochi; G. obliquata	Pedra do Ouro	Água de Madeiros	Isolated shells	A Bivalve of the family Gryphaeidae	
Gleviceras	G. guibalianum	Pedra do Ouro	Água de Madeiros	Isolated shells	An Ammonite of the family Oxynoticeratidae	Specimen
Leptonotoceras	L. abnorme	Água de Madeiros; Pedra do Ouro	Água de Madeiros	Isolated shells	An Ammonite of the family Polymorphitidae	
Mactromya	M. cardioides; M. spp.	Sao Pedro de Muel	Coimbra; Água de Madeiros	Isolated shells	A Bivalve of the family Mactromyidae	
Meleagrinella	M. substriata	Água de Madeiros	Água de Madeiros	Isolated shells	A Bivalve of the family Oxytomidae	
Mesomiltha	M. sp.	Água de Madeiros	Água de Madeiros	Isolated shells	A Bivalve of the family Lucinidae	
Microschiza	M. spp.	Praia Polvoeira; Praia da Pedra do Ouro; Sao Pedro de Muel	Coimbra; Água de Madeiros	Isolated shells	A Gastropod of the family Purpurinidae	
Modiolus	M. (Cyranus) hillanus	Pedra do Ouro	Água de Madeiros	Isolated shells	A Bivalve of the family Mytilidae	
Nerinella	N. ficalhoi	Penedo da Saudade	Coimbra	Isolated shells	A Gastropod of the family Nerinellidae	
Oonia	O. casta	Praia da Concha; Praia Velha	Coimbra; Água de Madeiros	Isolated shells	A Gastropod of the family Pseudomelaniidae	
Ostrea	O. sublamellosa	Sao Pedro de Muel	Coimbra	Isolated shells	A Bivalve of the family Ostreidae	Example of specimen
Oxynoticeras	O. spp.	Sao Pedro de Muel	Coimbra	Isolated shells	An Ammonite of the family Oxynoticeratidae	
Oxytoma	O. inequivalvis	Pedra do Ouro	Água de Madeiros	Isolated shells	A Bivalve of the family Oxytomidae	
Pachymya	P. (Arcomya) oblonga	Sao Pedro de Muel	Coimbra	Isolated shells	A Bivalve of the family Pholadomyidae	
Palaeoneilo	P. elliptica	Pedra do Ouro	Água de Madeiros	Isolated shells	A Bivalve of the family Malletiidae	
Paltechioceras	P. romanicum; P. elicitum; P. oosteri; P. tardecrescens; P. sp.	Água de Madeiros; Pedra do Ouro	Água de Madeiros	Isolated shells	An Ammonite of the family Echioceratidae	
Parainoceramya	P. dubia	Pedra do Ouro	Coimbra	Isolated shells	A Bivalve of the family Inoceramidae	
Parallelodon	P. sp.	Pedra do Ouro	Água de Madeiros	Isolated shells	A Bivalve of the family Parallelodontidae	
Pholadomya	P. (Pholadomya) voltzii; P. (Pholadomya) ambigua; P. spp.	Sao Pedro de Muel	Coimbra	Isolated shells	A Bivalve of the family Pholadomyidae	Example of specimen
Plagiostoma	P. punctatum	Pedra do Ouro	Água de Madeiros	Isolated shells	A Bivalve of the family Limidae	
Pleuromya	P. uniformis; P. galathea	Sao Pedro de Muel	Coimbra	Isolated shells	A Bivalve of the family Pleuromyidae	Example of specimen
Pseudokatosira	P.? aff. undulata; P. spp.	Palheira; Praia da Pedra do Ouro; Sao Pedro de Muel	Coimbra; Água de Madeiros	Isolated shells	A Gastropod of the family Zygopleurinae	
Pseudolimea	P. hettangiensis; P. koninckana	Pedra do Ouro	Água de Madeiros	Isolated shells	A Bivalve of the family Limidae	
Pseudomelania	P. costae; P. ssp.	Praia Polvoeira; Sao Pedro de Muel; Praia Velha; Praia da Concha; Praia da Pedra do Ouro	Coimbra; Água de Madeiros	Isolated shells	A Gastropod of the family Pseudomelaniidae	
Pseudopecten	P. (Pseudopecten) equivalvis	Pedra do Ouro	Água de Madeiros	Isolated shells	A Bivalve of the family Pectinidae	
Ptycharietites	P. asteroceroides; P. ("subgen. indet. B") muellense; P. (Ptycharietites) heterogenus; P. (Pompeckiocreas) cf. oncocephalus; P. (Ptycharietites) ptychogenos; P. spp.	Sao Pedro de Muel	Coimbra	Isolated shells	An Ammonite of the family Asteroceratidae	
Scurriopsis	S. (S.) schmidti	Almaroz (SGP Collection)	Água de Madeiros	Isolated shells	A Gastropod of the family Acmaeidae	
Steinmannia	S. bronni	Pedra do Ouro	Água de Madeiros	Isolated shells	A Bivalve of the family Posidoniidae	
Tangarilda	T. subturritella	Praia Velha	Água de Madeiros	Isolated shells	A Gastropod of the family Mathildidae	
Tutcheria	T. submulticostata	Pedra do Ouro	Água de Madeiros	Isolated shells	A Bivalve of the family Carditidae	
Unicardium	U. costae	Sao Pedro de Muel	Coimbra	Isolated shells	A Bivalve of the family Mactromyidae	

=== Crustacea ===
Genus	Species	Location	Formation	Material	Notes	Images
Donzocythere	D. cf. D. convergeas	Sao Pedro de Muel	Coimbra	Isolated Carapaces	A marine ostracodan member of the family Cythereinae	
Ektyphocythere	E. retia; E. lacunosa; E. sinemiurana; E. aff. sinemuriana	Sao Pedro de Muel; Peniche	Coimbra; Água de Madeiros	Isolated Carapaces	A marine ostracodan member of the family Progonocytherinae	
Klieana	K.? coimbraensis	Praia da Concha	Coimbra	Isolated Carapaces	A brackish marine ostracodan member of the family Cythereinae	
Klinglerella	"K." roselinae	Praia da Concha	Coimbra	Isolated Carapaces	A marine ostracodan member of the family Progonocytherinae	
Liasina	L. cf. lanceolata	Peniche	Água de Madeiros	Isolated Carapaces	A marine ostracodan member of the family Pontocyprididae	
Ljubimovella	L.? frequens	Sao Pedro de Muel	Coimbra	Isolated Carapaces	A marine ostracodan member of the family Cythereinae. The Second most abundant genus	
Lutkevichinella	L. hortonae	Sao Pedro de Muel	Coimbra	Isolated Carapaces	A brackish marine ostracodan member of the family Limnocytheridae	
Marslatourella	M. aff. M. heitoufensis	Sao Pedro de Muel	Coimbra	Isolated Carapaces	A marine ostracodan member of the family Cythereinae	
Monoceratina	M. sp.	Sao Pedro de Muel	Coimbra	Isolated Carapaces	A marine ostracodan member of the family Bythocytheridae	
Paracypris	P. redcarensis	Praia da Pedra do Ouro	Água de Madeiros	Isolated Carapaces	A marine ostracodan member of the family Paracyprididae	
Phraterfabanella	P. boomeri	Praia da Concha	Coimbra	Isolated Carapaces	A brackish marine ostracodan member of the family Cythereinae. Also recorded on the Rotzo Formation	
Polycope	P. cf. riegrafi	Praia da Pedra do Ouro	Água de Madeiros	Isolated Carapaces	A marine ostracodan member of the family Polycopidae	
Pseudomacrocypris	P. cf. P. subtriangularis	Praia da Concha	Coimbra	Isolated Carapaces	A marine ostracodan member of the family Macrocyprididae	
Tropacythere	T. praecaudata; T. normaniae	Sao Pedro de Muel; Praia da Pedra do Ouro	Coimbra; Água de Madeiros	Isolated Carapaces	A marine ostracodan member of the family Bythocytheridae	

=== Brachiopoda ===
Genus	Species	Location	Formation	Material	Notes	Images
Cincta	C. cor; C. kerastis	Papôa-Portinho da Areia; Sao Pedro de Muel	Coimbra; Água de Madeiros	Isolated shells	A Branchiopod of the family Zeilleriidae	
Cuersithyris	C. gijonensis	Papôa-Portinho da Areia; Sao Pedro de Muel	Coimbra; Água de Madeiros	Isolated shells	A Branchiopod of the family Lobothyrididae	
Lobothyris	L. sinemuriensis	Papôa-Portinho da Areia; Sao Pedro de Muel	Coimbra; Água de Madeiros	Isolated shells	A Branchiopod of the family Lobothyrididae	
Merophricus?	M.? (Terebratula?) ribeiroi	Papôa-Portinho da Areia; Sao Pedro de Muel	Coimbra; Água de Madeiros	Isolated shells	A Branchiopod of the family Plectoconchidae or Terebratulidae	Specimen of the genus
Piarorhynchia	P. juvenis	Sao Pedro de Muel	Água de Madeiros	Isolated shells	A Branchiopod of the family Rhynchonellidae	
Prionorhynchia	P. belemnitica	Sao Pedro de Muel	Água de Madeiros	Isolated shells	A Branchiopod of the family Prionorhynchiidae	
Squamirhynchia	S. squamiplex	Sao Pedro de Muel	Água de Madeiros	Isolated shells	A Branchiopod of the family Cyclothyrididae	
Spiriferina	S. walcotti	Sao Pedro de Muel	Água de Madeiros	Isolated shells	A Branchiopod of the family Spiriferinidae	Specimen of the same genus
Tetrarhynchia	T. dunrobinensis; T. ranina	Papôa-Portinho da Areia; Sao Pedro de Muel	Coimbra; Água de Madeiros	Isolated shells	A Branchiopod of the family Tetrarhynchiidae	
Zeilleria	Z. quiaiosensis; Z. ssp.	Papôa-Portinho da Areia; Sao Pedro de Muel	Coimbra; Água de Madeiros	Isolated shells	A Branchiopod of the family Zeilleriidae	

=== Actinopterygii ===
Genus	Species	Location	Formation	Material	Notes	Images
Furo	F. cf. orthostomus	Sao Pedro de Muel	Água de Madeiros	SPM1: part of a large fish, curved in on itself in a U-shape; SPM2: Numerous dissociated scales.	A Bony fish of the family Furidae	
Proleptolepis	P. sp.	Sao Pedro de Muel	Água de Madeiros	SPM3: crushed laterally fish of approximately 110 mm in standard length; SPM4: Cranial fragments, vertebrae from the anterior and middle regions of the body; SPMs: Cranial fragments; SPM6: Skull roof and numerous dissociated skull bones	A Bony fish of the family Leptolepidae	

=== Ichthyosauria ===
Genus	Species	Location	Formation	Material	Notes	Images
Gadusaurus	G. aqualigneus	Praia de Água de Madeiros	Água de Madeiros	ML 2750, nearly complete skull	An Ichthyosaur, member of Baracromia	Holotype
Ichthyosauria indet.	Indeterminate	Sao Pedro de Muel	Coimbra; Água de Madeiros	MG 4745, 1 vertebra; MG 4748 Set of 2 vertebrae	Incertade Sedis	
Ichthyosaurus	I. cf. communis; "I. intermedius"	Praia de Nossa Senhora da Victória; Casal Comba	Coimbra	Forelimbs (IST-MDT 85); Referred maxillary fragments with teeth (IST-MDT 104) & set of vertebrae (IST-MDT 103)	An Ichthyosaur, member of Ichthyosauridae	Ichthyosaurus reconstruction

=== Plesiosauria ===
Genus	Species	Location	Formation	Material	Notes	Images
Plesiopharos	P. moelensis	Praia da Concha	Coimbra	ML2302, a partial skeleton belonging to a single individual	A Plesiosaur, possible member of Plesiosauroidea	Plesiopharos reconstruction

=== Archosauria ===
In February 2025 it was announced the discovery of Dinosaur remains within Água de Madeiros beach, excavated in 2024, extracted in a block weighing around 1200 kilos.

Genus	Species	Location	Formation	Material	Notes	Images
Batrachopus	B. isp.	Campo de Alvaiázere	Coimbra	Footprints	Tracks referred to Crocodylomorpha, maybe marine Teleosauridae	
Lusitanosaurus	L. liasicus	Sao Pedro de Muel	Unknown	Single partial left maxilla	An Indeterminate Archosaur, previously thought to be a Thyreophoran dinosaur. Its exact provenance is unknown	
Moyenisauropus	M. lusitanicus	Campo de Alvaiázere	Coimbra	Footprints	Tracks referred to the Dinosaurian group Thyreophora, probably from a taxon similar to Scelidosaurus.	Scelidosaurus, a possible relative of the Moyenisauropus trackmaker

=== Plantae ===
Fossil wood including large logs with abundant Phytoclast material are common in the Água de Madeiros Formation.

Genus	Species	Location	Formation	Material	Notes	Images
Alisporites	A. sp.	Carvalhais	Coimbra	Pollen	Affinities with the families Peltaspermaceae and Corystospermaceae	
Araucariacites	A. sp.	Carvalhais	Coimbra	Pollen	Affinities with the Araucariaceae in the Pinopsida.	Example of extant Araucaria cones
Classopollis	C. meyeriana; C. torosus	Carvalhais; S. Pedro de Moel; Peniche	Coimbra; Água de Madeiros	Pollen	Affinities with the Hirmeriellaceae in the Pinopsida.	
Deltoidospora	D. sp.	Carvalhais	Coimbra	Spores	Incertae sedis; affinities with the Pteridophyta	
Kraeuselisporites	K. reissingeri	Carvalhais	Coimbra	Spores	Affinities with the Selaginellaceae in the Lycopsida.	Extant Selaginella, typical example of Selaginellaceae.
Ovalipollis	O. ovalis	Carvalhais	Coimbra	Pollen	Affinities with the Majonicaceae in the Pinopsida.	
Perinopollenites	P. elatoides	Carvalhais	Coimbra	Pollen	Affinities with the family Cupressaceae in the Pinopsida.	Extant Austrocedrus, example of Cupressaceae
Pinuspollenites	P. minimus	Carvalhais	Coimbra	Pollen	Affinities with the Pinaceae in the Pinopsida.	Extant Picea, example of Pinaceae
Porcellispora	P. longdonensis	Carvalhais	Coimbra	Spores	Incertae sedis; affinities with Bryophyta.	
Trachysporites	T. sp.	Carvalhais	Coimbra	Spores	Incertae sedis; affinities with the Pteridophyta	

== See also ==
- List of dinosaur-bearing rock formations
- Blue Lias, England
- Charmouth Mudstone Formation, England
- Zagaje Formation, Poland
- Drzewica Formation, Poland
- Ciechocinek Formation, Poland
- Borucice Formation, Poland
- Rotzo Formation, Italy
- Saltrio Formation, Italy
- Moltrasio Formation, Italy
- Marne di Monte Serrone, Italy
- Calcare di Sogno, Italy
- Podpeč Limestone, Slovenia
- El Pedregal Formation, Spain
- Aganane Formation, Morocco
- Tafraout Group, Morocco
- Azilal Formation, Morocco
- Budoš Limestone, Montenegro
- Kota Formation, India
- Cañadón Asfalto Formation, Argentina
- Los Molles Formation, Argentina
- Kandreho Formation, Madagascar
- Elliot Formation, South Africa
- Clarens Formation, South Africa
- Evergreen Formation, Australia
- Cattamarra Coal Measures, Australia
- Hanson Formation, Antarctica
- Mawson Formation, Antarctica
