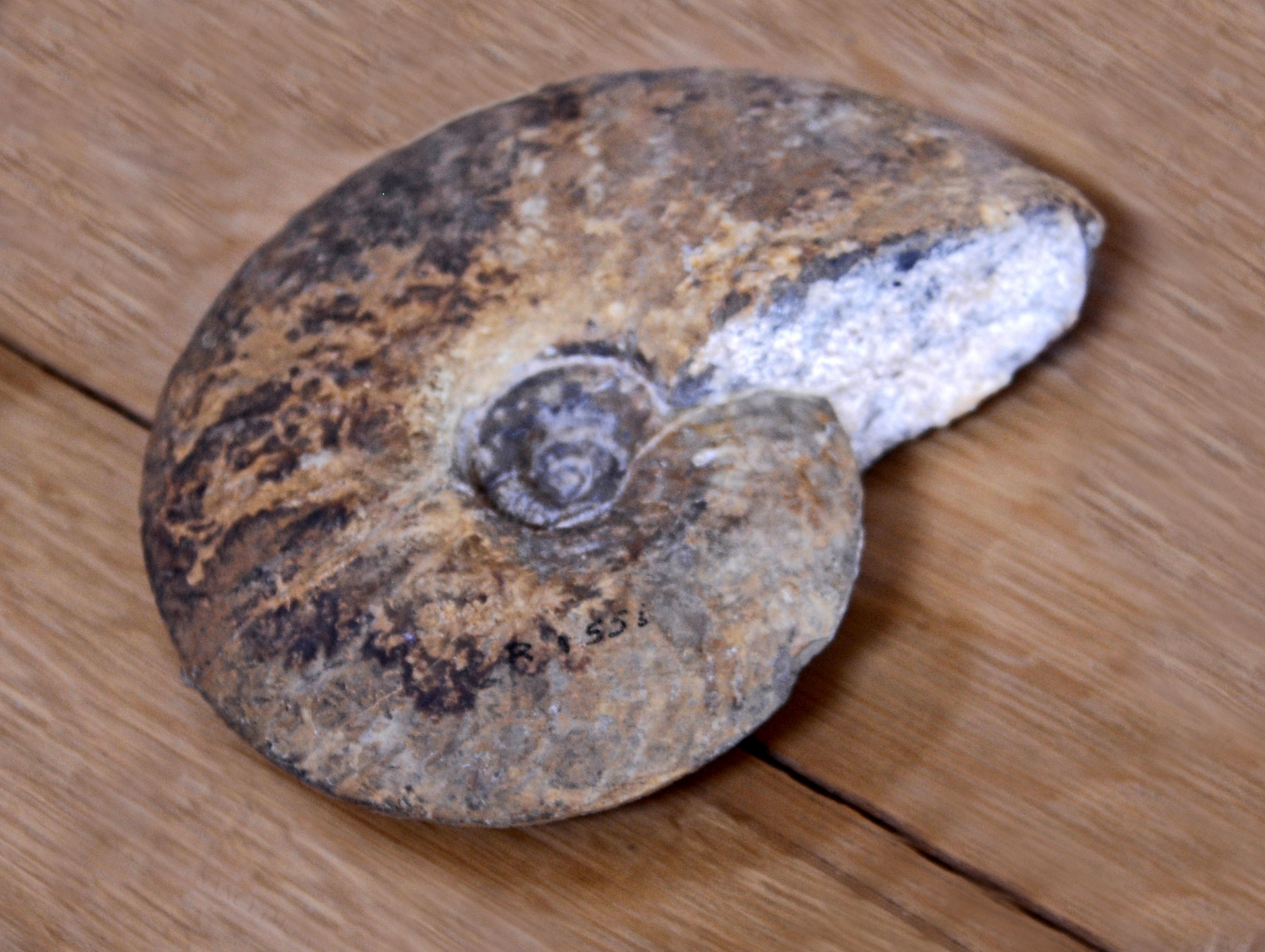
- Fossil of Gleviceras guabalianum

Scientific classification
- Kingdom: Animalia
- Phylum: Mollusca
- Class: Cephalopoda
- Subclass: †Ammonoidea
- Order: †Ammonitida
- Family: †Oxynoticeratidae
- Genus: †Gleviceras; Buckman, 1918

Synonyms
- Glevumites Buckman, 1924; Guibaliceras Buckman, 1918; Riparioceras Schindewolf, 1962; Tutchericeras Buckman, 1919; Victoriceras Buckman, 1918

= Gleviceras =

Gleviceras Temporal range: Sinemurian

Genus of molluscs (fossil)

Gleviceras is an ammonite genus (order Ammonitida) that lived during the Early Jurassic Period, found in Canada, Hungary, Mexico and the United Kingdom.

Glevumites Buckman 1924, Guibaliceras Buckman 1918, Riparioceras Schindewolf 1962, Tutchericeras Buckman 1919, and Victoriceras Buckman 1918 are considered synonyms.

== Description ==
Gleviceras produced laterally compressed involute shells with a small umbilicus, close spaced sinuous ribbing, and a sharp keel along venter. The suture is ammonitic with deep narrow complex lobes. It is similar to Oxynoticeras except for being less narrow and having a more rounded venter. Fastigiceras differs primarily in having an occluded umbilicus.

== Taxonomy ==
Gleviceras was described by Buckman in 1918 and is included in the Family Oxynoticeratidae and superfamily Psiloceratoidea. Species include:

- Gleviceras doris Reynes, 1879
- Gleviceras guibalianum D'orbigny, 1844
- Gleviceras iridescens Tutcher and Trueman, 1925
- Gleviceras lotharingius Reynes, 1879
- Gleviceras palomense Erben, 1956

Gleviceras is closely related to the genera Cheltonia, Hypoxynoticeras, Oxynoticeras, Paracymbites, Paroxynoticeras, Radstockiceras and Slatterites.
