= Lusitanosaurus =

Lusitanosaurus Temporal range: Late Sinemurian 191 Ma

Scientific classification
- Kingdom: Animalia
- Phylum: Chordata
- Class: Reptilia
- Genus: †Lusitanosaurus
- Species: †L. liasicus

Binomial name
- †Lusitanosaurus liasicus Lapparent & Zbyszewski, 1957

Extinct genus of dinosaur

Lusitanosaurus (meaning "Portuguese lizard") is a genus of reptile from the Sinemurian stage of the Early Jurassic of Portugal, maybe from the Coimbra Formation. It was considered the second example of the dinosaurian group Thyreophora from the Sinemurian of Europe and the oldest known dinosaur from the Iberian Peninsula, but this affinity has been contested. It is based on a large left maxilla with teeth that was lost in the fire at Museu Nacional de História Natural e da Ciência, Lisbon, in 1978.

== Description ==
The fossil consists of a single partial left maxilla, an upper jaw bone, with seven teeth. The jaw measured 10.5 cm, with an estimated skull of 38.7 cm for the living animal. The teeth were described to be similar to those of Scelidosaurus, which approaches it narrowly by the presence of important anterior and posterior basilar points on each tooth. The maxilla was clearly bigger, being the double of the size than the maxilla of Scelidosaurus. Lapparent & Zbyszewski vinculated it originally with Scelidosaurus and assigned the two to Stegosauria, he described that the teeth present were different to Scelidosaurus. Ginsburg cited the specimen and note a bigger size than the holotype of Scelidosaurus.

== History of discovery ==
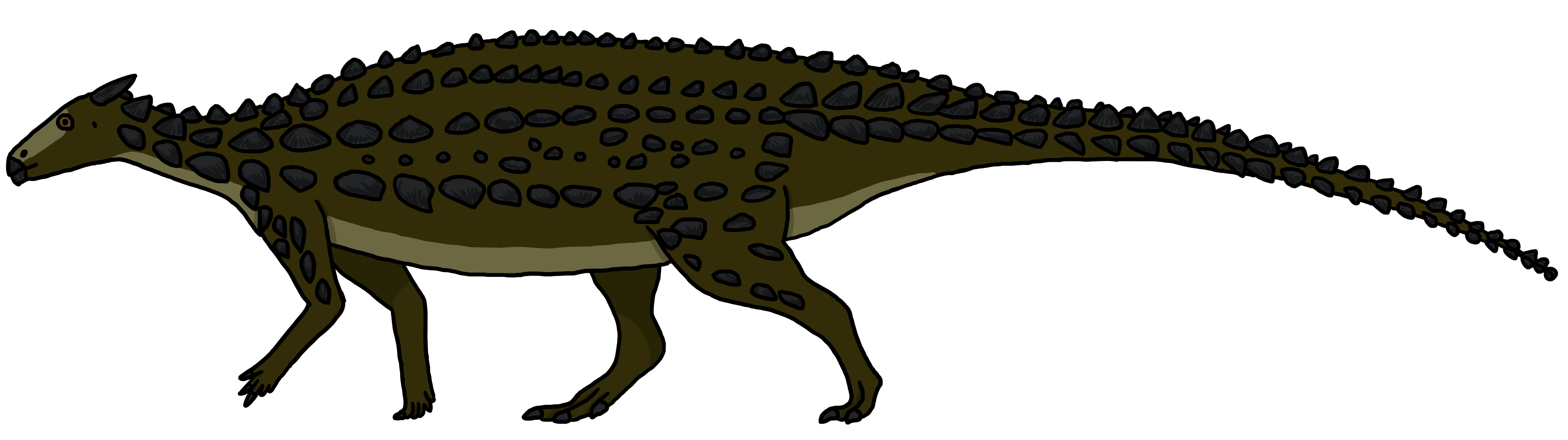
Lusitanosaurus restored as a thyreophoran as originally described

The genus was first described by Albert-Félix de Lapparent and Georges Zbyszewski in 1957. The type species is Lusitanosaurus liasicus. The generic name is derived from Lusitania, the ancient Latin name for the region. The specific name refers to the Lias. The holotype was part of the collection of the Museu de História Natural da Universidade de Lisboa. The exact location of the find and the date of collection are unknown, which makes a correct geological dating difficult, but it can be inferred from the matrix rock that it has been discovered near São Pedro de Moel, in strata from the Late Sinemurian (Early Jurassic). This would make it the oldest known dinosaur from Portugal.

== Classification ==
It was originally assigned to the Stegosauria by de Lapparent, Lusitanosaurus was then considered a basal member of the Thyreophora, perhaps belonging to the Scelidosauridae, but this is tentative, as this family is considered paraphyletic. The fragmentary condition of the specimen does not help to identify it well, as it can be from different grades inside basal Thyreophora, such as a relative of Emausaurus. Some authors consider it a nomen dubium.

A revision of the phylogenetic relationships of early-diverging ornithischians found that the material of Lusitanosaurus as figured and described does not show any features characteristic of Thyreophora or even Ornithischia, and instead displays several differences that are found in the groups Pterosauria, Squamata, Tanystropheidae and basal Cynodontia. The presence of ankylothecodont teeth supported a placement of Lusitanosaurus preliminarily within Archosauromorpha, but not as an ornithischian.

== Paleoenvironment ==
The São Pedro de Moel rocks consists on calcareous strata, mostly from Marginal Marine environments belonging to the Coimbra Formation. Outside Lusitanosaurus, fishes have been found on this rock, such as members of the genus Proleptolepis. Ammonites are also common, such as Oxynoticeras, Bifericeras, Cheltonia and Plesechioceras. Finally, this section is known for its calcareous nannofossils that expose the Sinemurian/Pliensbachian transition more detailed than in any part of Portugal.
