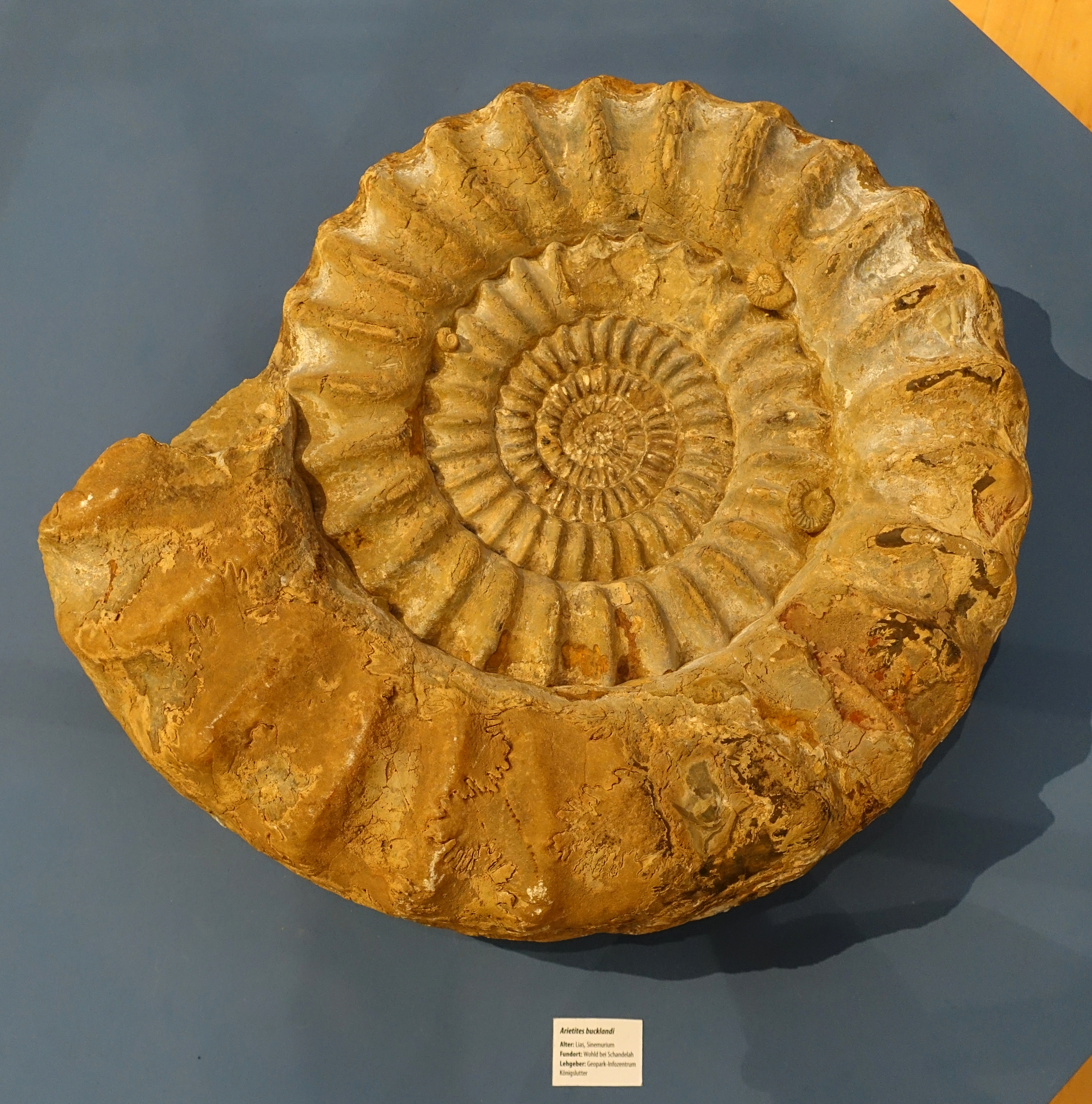
- Arietites bucklandi

Scientific classification
- Kingdom: Animalia
- Phylum: Mollusca
- Class: Cephalopoda
- Subclass: †Ammonoidea
- Order: †Ammonitida
- Family: †Arietitidae
- Genus: †Arietites; Waagen, 1869

Synonyms
- Coroniceras? Arkell, 1947

= Arietites =

Arietites Temporal range: Early Jurassic, Sinemurian

Genus of molluscs (fossil)

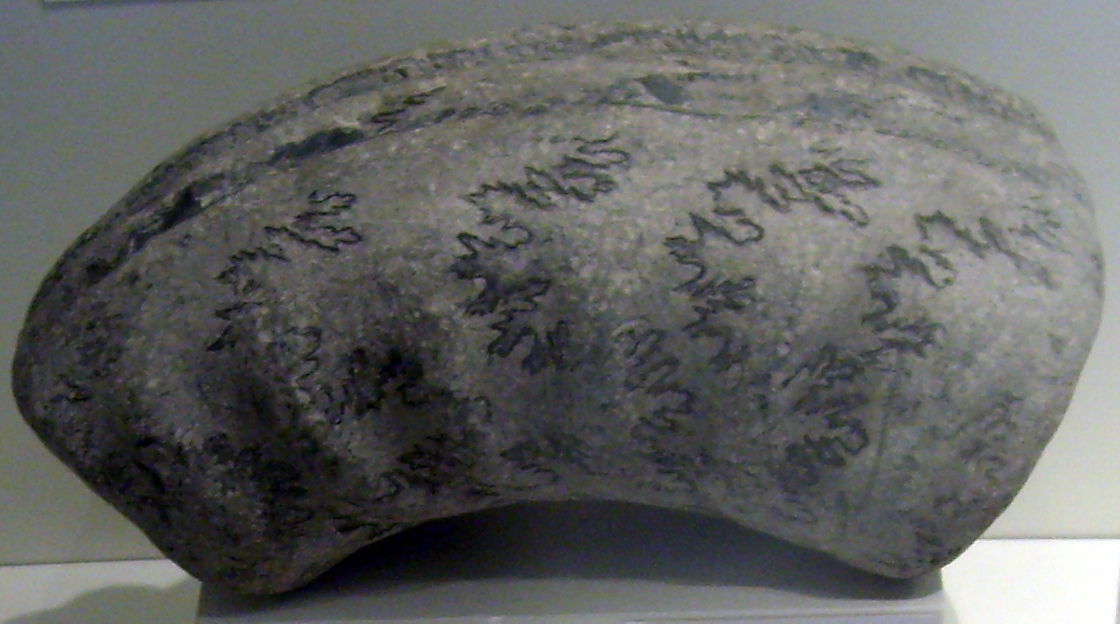
Arietites bucklandi fossil at the Geological Museum in Copenhagen

Arietites is a genus of massive, giant evolute, psiloceratacean ammonites in the family Arietitidae in which whorls are subquadrate and transversely ribbed and low keels in triplicate, separated by a pair of longitudinal grooves, run along the venter. Fossils are known world wide from the lower Sinemurian stage of the Lower Jurassic. Safari Ltd made an Arietites bucklandi figurine in 2014.

Similar genera include Megarietites in which the keels are reduced and Epammonites in which the ribs are more closely spaced.

== Species ==
- Arietites ablongaris
- Arietites alcinoe Reynès, 1879
- Arietites anastreptoptychus Franz Wähner, 1891 (possibly a synonym of Paracaloceras subsalinarium; Wähner)
- Arietites bisulcatus
- Arietites bonnardii Alcide Dessalines d'Orbigny, 1879
- Arietites brookei
- Arietites bucklandi George Brettingham Sowerby, 1816
- Arietites crossi
- Arietites gaudryi Reynès
- Arietites geometricus Albert Oppe, 1856
- Arietites hettangiensis
- Arietites isis
- Arietites longicellus Friedrich August Quenstedt, 1858
- Arietites meigeni, (possibly a synonym of Leptechioceras meigeni)
- Arietites meridionalis Reynès
- Arietites obesulus J. F. Blake, 1876
- Arietites obtusus
- Arietites pinguis
- Arietites planaries Reynès, 1879
- Arietites quadratus E. Donovan, 1952
- Arietites radiatus C. T. Simpson, 1843
- Arietites retroversicostatus Canavari
- Arietites rotiformis Sowerby
- Arietites scunthorpense
- Arietites semicostatus A. T. Young & Bird, 1828
- Arietites spiratissimus
- Arietites subsalinarius Wähner, 1891, (possibly a synonym of Paracaloceras subsalinarium; Wähner)
- Arietites tenellus C. T. Simpson, 1855
- Arietites turneri
- Arieties westfalicus Lange (possibly a synonym of Coroniceras westfalicum Lange, 1925)
- Arietites wichmanni August Rothpletz, 1892

Note: Arietites now only represents a purely morphological term. A revision of the genus is still pending, its representatives are therefore initially classified as Coroniceras (Arietites) under Coroniceras .
