= Paroxynoticeras =

Paroxynoticeras Temporal range: Sinemurian

Scientific classification
- Kingdom: Animalia
- Phylum: Mollusca
- Class: Cephalopoda
- Subclass: †Ammonoidea
- Order: †Ammonitida
- Family: †Oxynoticeratidae
- Genus: †Paroxynoticeras; Pia, 1914

Type species
- Ammonites salisburgensis Hauer, 1856

Species
- Paroxynoticeras salisburgense Hauer, 1856; Paroxynoticeras subundulatum Pia, 1914

Synonyms
- Paraoxynoticeras Arkell, 1957

Genus of molluscs (fossil)

Paroxynoticeras is an extinct genus of lower Jurassic ammonite that lived during upper Sinemurian. Animals belonging to this genus had platyconic shells with compressed whorl section and could grow to large sizes. In the case of young specimens, umbilicus is small, but it increases in bigger specimens.. Last whorl is excentric, which can occur also in relative species, Paracymbites. While on the outer whorls, venter is always rounded, on inner whorls it can be both rounded or sharp. Ornamentation on inner whorls and suture is similar to Oxynoticeras, but in bigger specimens, ribs became straight, simple and blunt. In these bigger specimens, midlateral tubercules might be present.

== Distribution ==
Fossils belonging to this genus were found in Europe, Tunisia and Morocco.
