= Hypasteroceras =

Hypasteroceras Temporal range: 196.5–189.6 Ma

Scientific classification
- Kingdom: Animalia
- Phylum: Mollusca
- Class: Cephalopoda
- Subclass: †Ammonoidea
- Order: †Ammonitida
- Family: †Arietitidae
- Subfamily: †Hypasteroceratinae
- Genus: †Hypasteroceras; Spath, 1923

Genus of molluscs (fossil)

Hypasteroceras is an extinct genus of cephalopod belonging to the ammonite subclass.
