= True Star =

True Star may refer to:

- True Star (perfume), a Tommy Hilfiger product
- True Star Ammonite (Asteroceras stellare), an extinct cephalopod
- Troschel's true star (Evasterias troschelii), a species of starfish
- Tek Sing (Chinese:True Star), a Chinese ocean-going junk that sank in 1822
