= Cymbitidae =

Cymbitidae Temporal range: Sinemurian–Pliensbachian

Scientific classification
- Kingdom: Animalia
- Phylum: Mollusca
- Class: Cephalopoda
- Subclass: †Ammonoidea
- Order: †Ammonitida
- Superfamily: †Psiloceratoidea
- Family: †Cymbitidae; Buckman, 1919

Extinct family of ammonites

Cymbitidae is family of ammonite that lived during Sinemurian and Pliensbachian stages of Lower Jurassic. They have probably evolved from Arietitidae.

== Description ==
Ammonites belonging to this family had shells with sphaeroconic involute inner whorls that later during ontogeny become evolute and last whorl is highly eccentric. They were small and mostly less than 2 cm in diameter. Venter is smooth, fastigate or rounded. There was constriction on aperture. Ornamentation was weak, as shell was smooth or plicate and only rarely there were lateral tubercules.

== Genera ==
Cymbitidae is probably monogeneric family. It is named after genus Cymbites Neumayr, 1878. One more genus has been added there and it is Hyerifalchia Fucini, 1907, but this one is probably only a synonym of Cymbites.

== Distribution ==
Ammonites of this family were found in Europe, US and Tunisia.
