= Aegasteroceras =

Scientific classification
- Kingdom: Animalia
- Phylum: Mollusca
- Class: Cephalopoda
- Subclass: †Ammonoidea
- Order: †Ammonitida
- Family: †Arietitidae
- Subfamily: †Asteroceratinae
- Genus: †Aegasteroceras; Spath, 1925

Extinct genus of molluscs

Aegasteroceras is an extinct cephalopod genus from the Lower Jurassic belonging to the arietitid subfamily Asteroceratinae. The shell of Aegasteroceras is evolute with curve forward and meet at a broad low ventral keel. Aegasteroceras, named by Spath, 1925, has been found in the Sinemurian (Lower Jurassic) of England.
