= Pantarbes =

Scientific classification
- Domain: Eukaryota
- Kingdom: Animalia
- Phylum: Arthropoda
- Class: Insecta
- Order: Diptera
- Family: Bombyliidae
- Subfamily: Cythereinae
- Genus: Pantarbes; Osten Sacken, 1877

Genus of flies

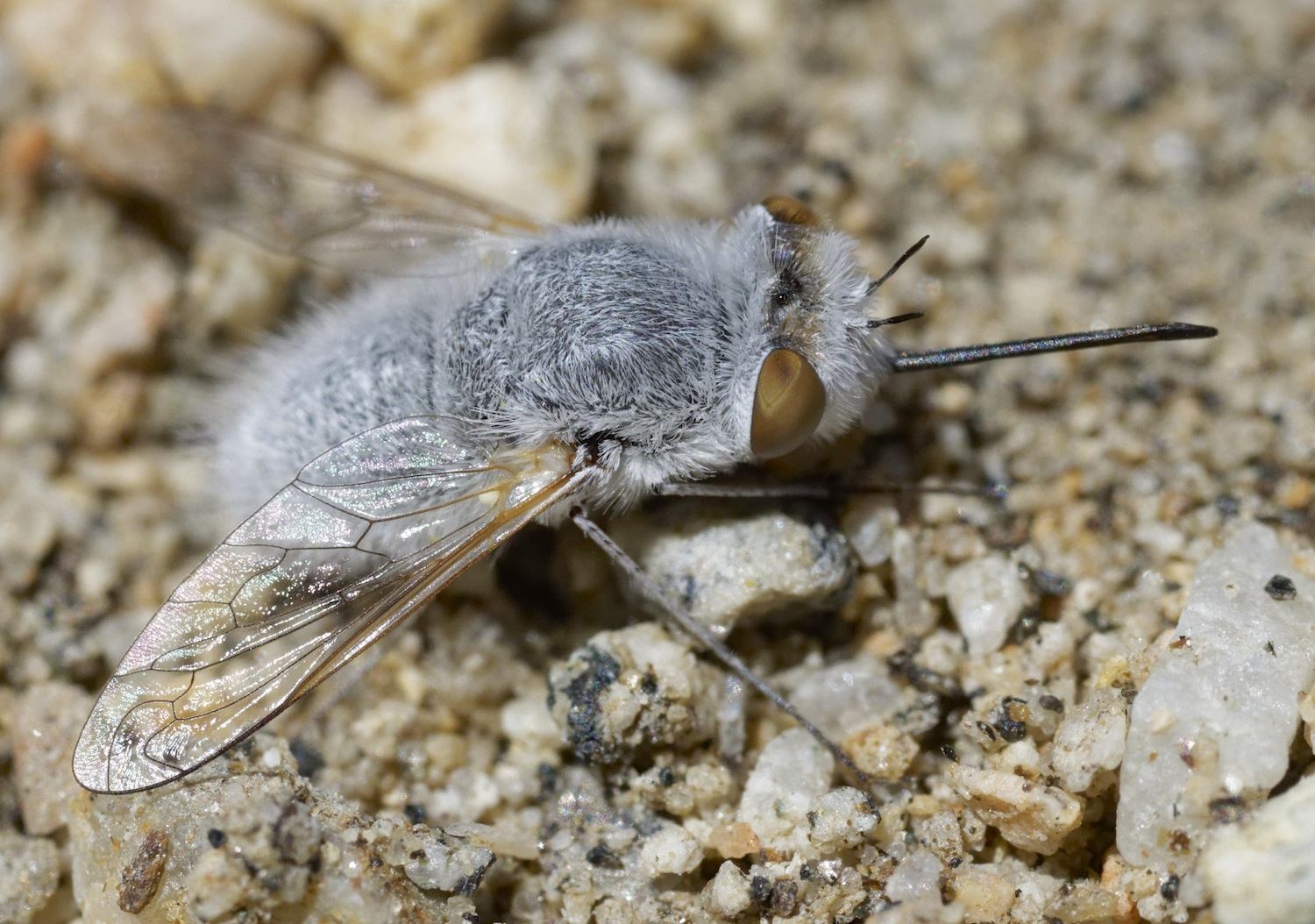

Pantarbes is a genus of bee flies in the family Bombyliidae. There are six described species in Pantarbes.

== Species ==
These six species belong to the genus Pantarbes:

- Pantarbes capito Osten Sacken, 1877^{i c g b}
- Pantarbes earinus Hall & Evenhuis, 1984^{i c g b}
- Pantarbes megistus Hall & Evenhuis, 1984^{i c g b}
- Pantarbes pusio Osten Sacken, 1887^{i c g}
- Pantarbes scinax Hall and Evenhuis, 1984^{i c g}
- Pantarbes willistoni Osten Sacken, 1887^{i c g}

Data sources: i = ITIS, c = Catalogue of Life, g = GBIF, b = Bugguide.net
