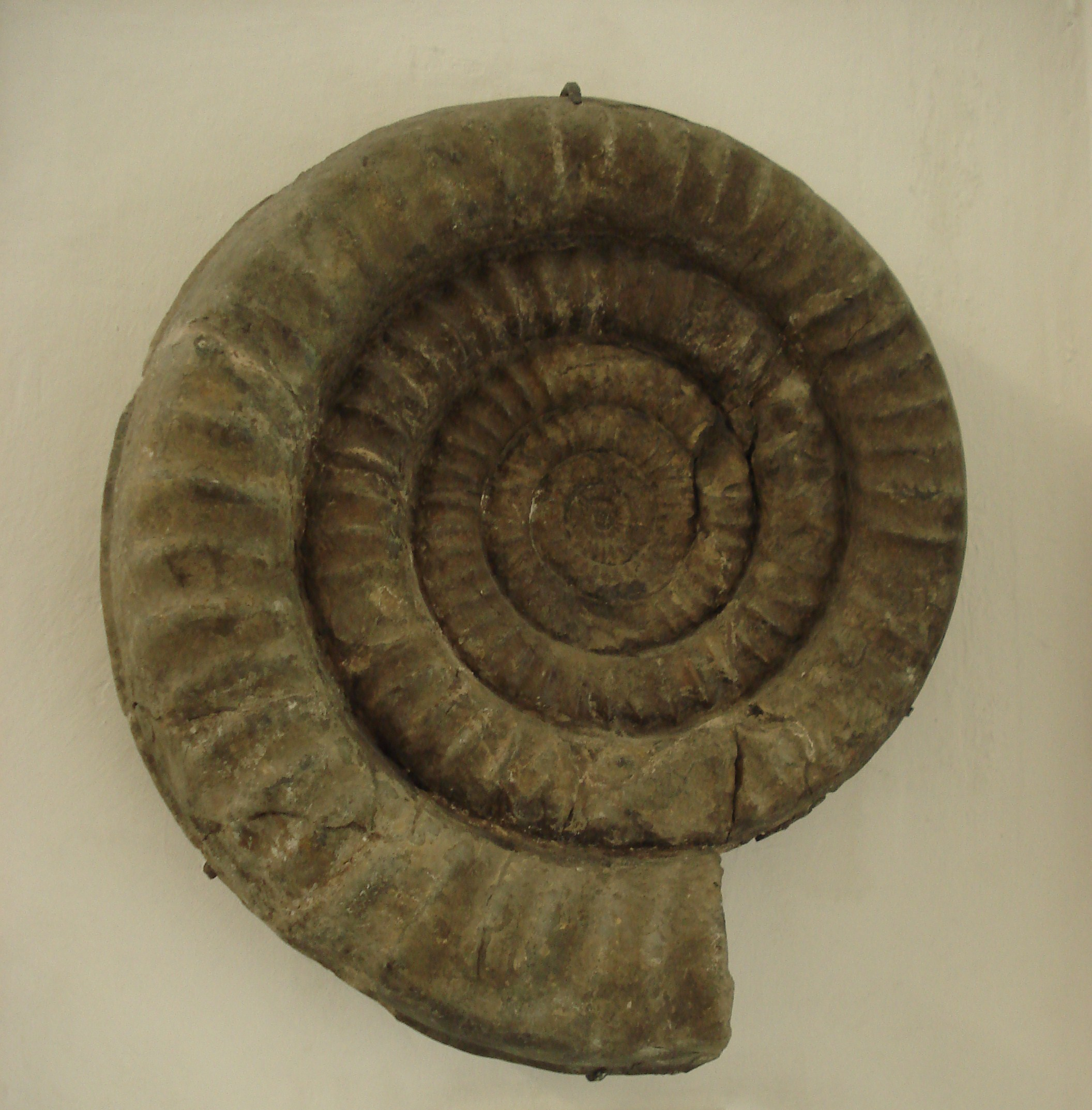
- Coroniceras rotiforme

Scientific classification
- Kingdom: Animalia
- Phylum: Mollusca
- Class: Cephalopoda
- Subclass: †Ammonoidea
- Order: †Ammonitida
- Family: †Arietitidae
- Subfamily: †Arietitinae
- Genus: †Coroniceras; Hyatt, 1867

Species
- C. bucklandi; C. charlesi; C. rotiforme; C. validanfractum

Synonyms
- Arnioceratoides Spath, 1922; Epammonites Spath, 1922; Pararnioceras; Primarietites Buckman, 1926; Saccaiaceras Nannarone, 2002; Venturi Nannarone, 2002

= Coroniceras =

Coroniceras Temporal range: Early Jurassic, Sinemurian

Genus of molluscs (fossil)

Coroniceras is a genus in the Arietitidae, a family in the ammonitid superfamily Psiloceratoidea, from the lower Sinermurian stage in the Lower Jurassic. It is a sub zone ammonite of the Arnioceras semicostatum Zone.

Coroniceras has a thin discoidal form with a circular whorl section, arched venter, single tall keel, and few but strong ribs. Coroniceras is included in the subfamily Arietitinae.

Fossils of Coroniceras bucklandi are commonly found at Lyme Regis, Dorset Coast, England in the higher limestones of the Blue Lias.
