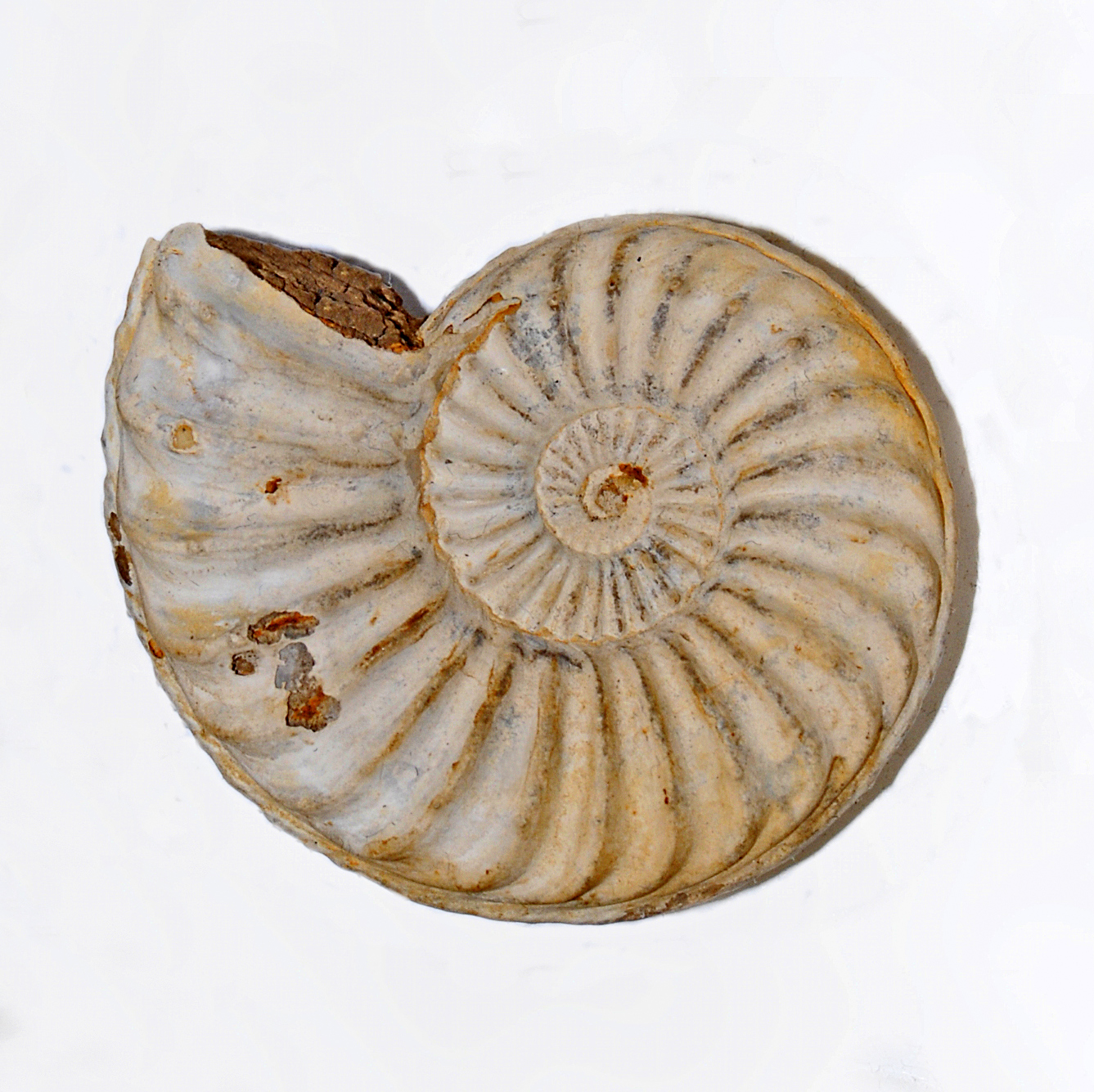
- Fossil of Asteroceras stellare from Nuremberg (Germany)

Scientific classification
- Domain: Eukaryota
- Kingdom: Animalia
- Phylum: Mollusca
- Class: Cephalopoda
- Subclass: †Ammonoidea
- Order: †Ammonitida
- Family: †Arietitidae
- Genus: †Asteroceras
- Species: †A. stellare

Binomial name
- †Asteroceras stellare (Sowerby, 1815)

= Asteroceras stellare =

Asteroceras stellare Temporal range: 196.5–189.6 Ma

Extinct species of ammonite

Asteroceras stellare, the true star ammonite, is an extinct species of cephalopod belonging to the Ammonite subclass and to the family Arietitidae.

These fast-moving nektonic carnivores lived during the lower Jurassic period, around 196.5 to 189.6 million years ago.

== Description ==
Asteroceras stellare has a shell reaching a diameter of about 90 centimetres (35 in).

== Distribution ==
Fossils of this species may be found in the Jurassic of Germany, Hungary and United Kingdom.
