= Pantarbes earinus =

Scientific classification
- Domain: Eukaryota
- Kingdom: Animalia
- Phylum: Arthropoda
- Class: Insecta
- Order: Diptera
- Family: Bombyliidae
- Genus: Pantarbes
- Species: P. earinus

Binomial name
- Pantarbes earinus Hall & Evenhuis, 1984

Species of fly

Pantarbes earinus is a species of bee fly in the family Bombyliidae. It is found in western North America, from British Columbia, Canada to New Mexico in the United States.
