= Cytherea (fly) =

Scientific classification
- Kingdom: Animalia
- Phylum: Arthropoda
- Clade: Pancrustacea
- Class: Insecta
- Order: Diptera
- Family: Bombyliidae
- Subfamily: Cythereinae
- Genus: Cytherea; Fabricius, 1794

Type species
- Cytherea obscura Fabricius, 1794

Synonyms
- Mulio Latreille, 1797; Astropha Rafinesque, 1815; Glossista Rondani, 1856; Cyterea Rondani, 1856; Cyterea Bigot, 1857; Logcocerius Rondani, 1863; Logiocerius Scudder, 1882; Loncocerius Bezzi, 1903; Loncocerius Kertész, 1909; Lonchocerius Bezzi, 1924; Lohcocerius Zaitzev, 1989

Genus of flies

Cytherea is a genus of bee flies (flies in the family Bombyliidae).

== Species ==
- Cytherea adumbrata Paramonov, 1930
- Cytherea angusta Paramonov, 1930
- Cytherea araxana Paramonov, 1930
- Cytherea arenicola Paramonov, 1930
- Cytherea aurea Fabricius, 1794
- Cytherea barbara Sack, 1906
- Cytherea bucharensis Paramonov, 1930
- Cytherea cinerea Fabricius, 1805
- Cytherea deserticola Paramonov, 1930
- Cytherea dichroma Paramonov, 1930
- Cytherea discipes Becker, 1915
- Cytherea disparoides Paramonov, 1930
- Cytherea dubia Macquart, 1846
- Cytherea elegans Paramonov, 1930
- Cytherea esfandarii Lindner, 1979
- Cytherea esfandiarii Lindner, 1975
- Cytherea fasciata Fabricius, 1805
- Cytherea fusciventris Zaitzev, 1966
- Cytherea innitidifrons Abbassian-Lintzen, 1968
- Cytherea iranica Abbassian-Lintzen, 1968
- Cytherea lateralis Rondani, 1868
- Cytherea latifrons Paramonov, 1930
- Cytherea lyncharribalzagai Evenhuis, 1978
- Cytherea marginalis Rondani, 1868
- Cytherea mervensis Paramonov, 1927
- Cytherea obscura Fabricius, 1794
- Cytherea pallidifrons Evenhuis, 1978
- Cytherea pallidipennis Abbassian-Lintzen, 1968
- Cytherea pamirensis Paramonov, 1930
- Cytherea Paramonov Evenhuis, 1999
- Cytherea rungsi Timon-David, 1952
- Cytherea setosa Paramonov, 1930
- Cytherea turanica Paramonov, 1930
- Cytherea turkestanica Paramonov, 1930
- Cytherea turkmenica Paramonov, 1930
- Cytherea wadensis Efflatoun, 1945
