= Cytherea elegans =

Scientific classification
- Kingdom: Animalia
- Phylum: Arthropoda
- Class: Insecta
- Order: Diptera
- Family: Bombyliidae
- Genus: Cytherea
- Species: C. elegans

Binomial name
- Cytherea elegans Paramonov, 1930

Synonyms
- Cytherea paramonovi Evenhuis & Greathead, 1999

Species of fly

Cytherea elegans is a species of bee flies (flies in the family Bombyliidae). It is found in France.
