= Pantarbes megistus =

Scientific classification
- Domain: Eukaryota
- Kingdom: Animalia
- Phylum: Arthropoda
- Class: Insecta
- Order: Diptera
- Family: Bombyliidae
- Genus: Pantarbes
- Species: P. megistus

Binomial name
- Pantarbes megistus Hall & Evenhuis, 1984

Species of insect

Pantarbes megistus is a species of bee fly in the family Bombyliidae. It is known only from the northern portion of the Mojave Desert in California.
