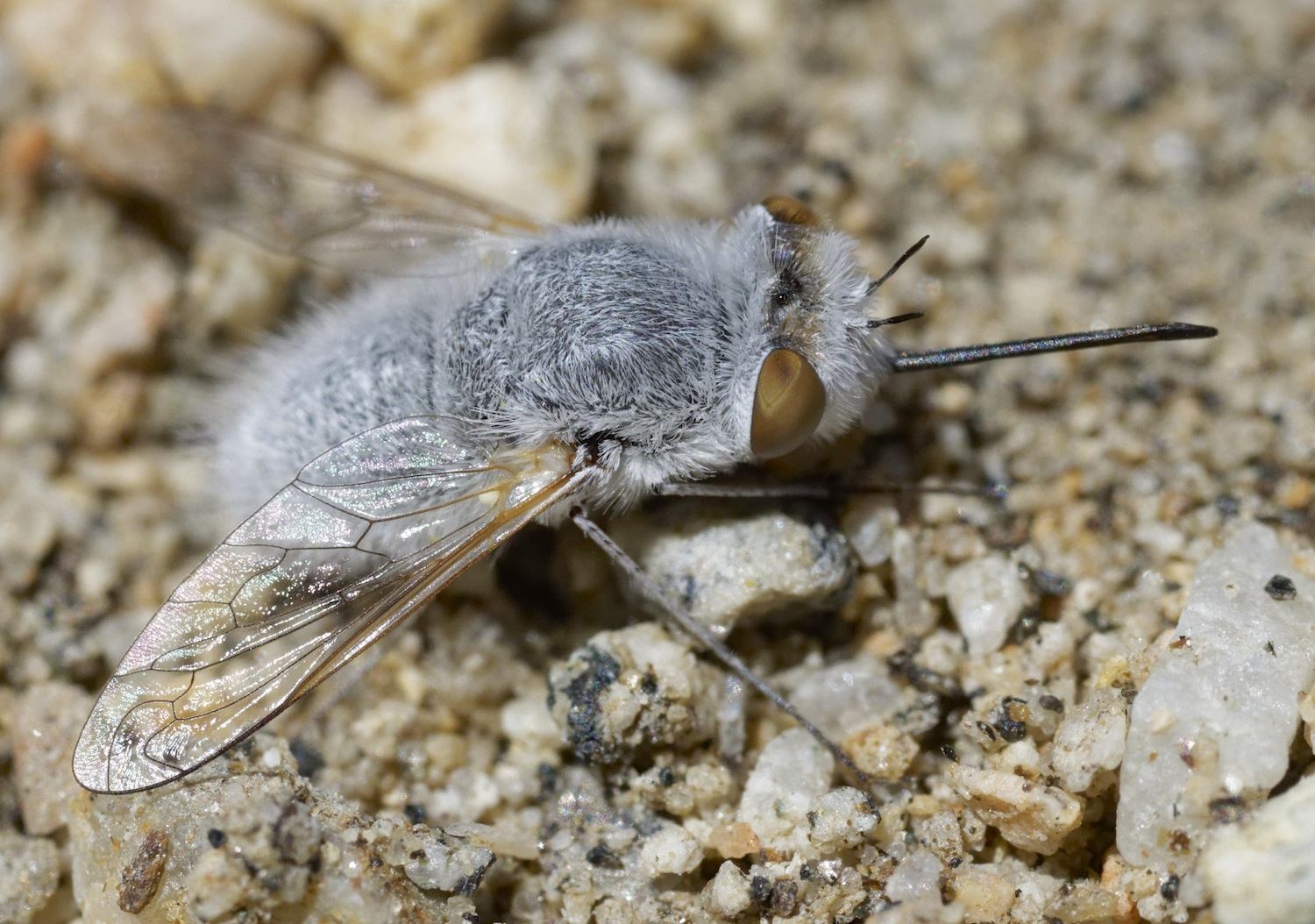

Scientific classification
- Domain: Eukaryota
- Kingdom: Animalia
- Phylum: Arthropoda
- Class: Insecta
- Order: Diptera
- Family: Bombyliidae
- Genus: Pantarbes
- Species: P. capito

Binomial name
- Pantarbes capito Osten Sacken, 1877

= Pantarbes capito =

Species of fly

Pantarbes capito is a species of bee fly in the family Bombyliidae. It is found in the southwestern United States from California to Wyoming.
