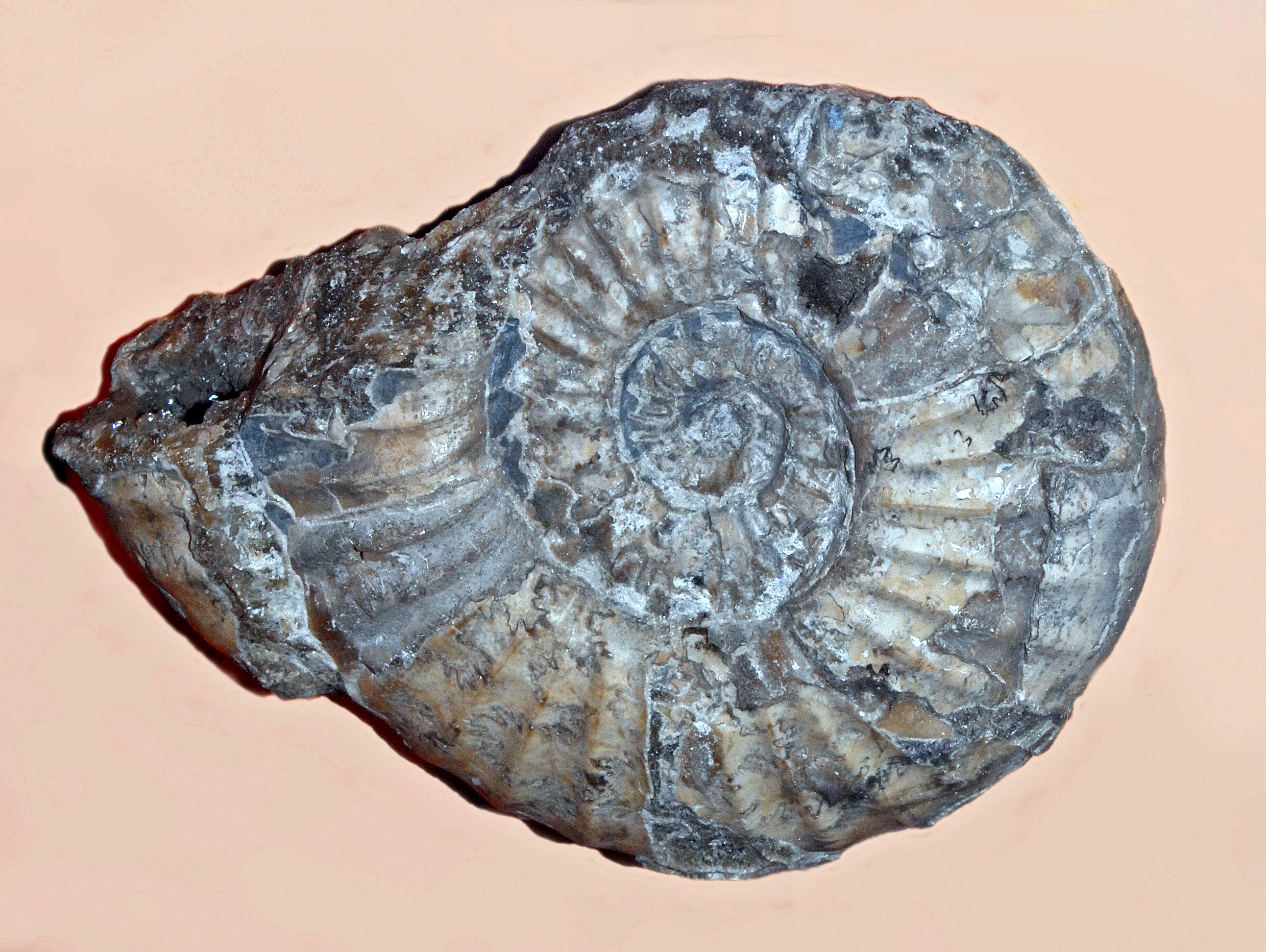
- Family Arietitidae, Asteroceras stellare

Scientific classification
- Kingdom: Animalia
- Phylum: Mollusca
- Class: Cephalopoda
- Subclass: †Ammonoidea
- Order: †Ammonitida
- Suborder: †Ammonitina
- Superfamily: †Psiloceratoidea; Hyatt, 1867

Families
- See text

= Psiloceratoidea =

Psiloceratoidea Temporal range: Hettangian–Pliensbachian

Extinct superfamily of molluscs

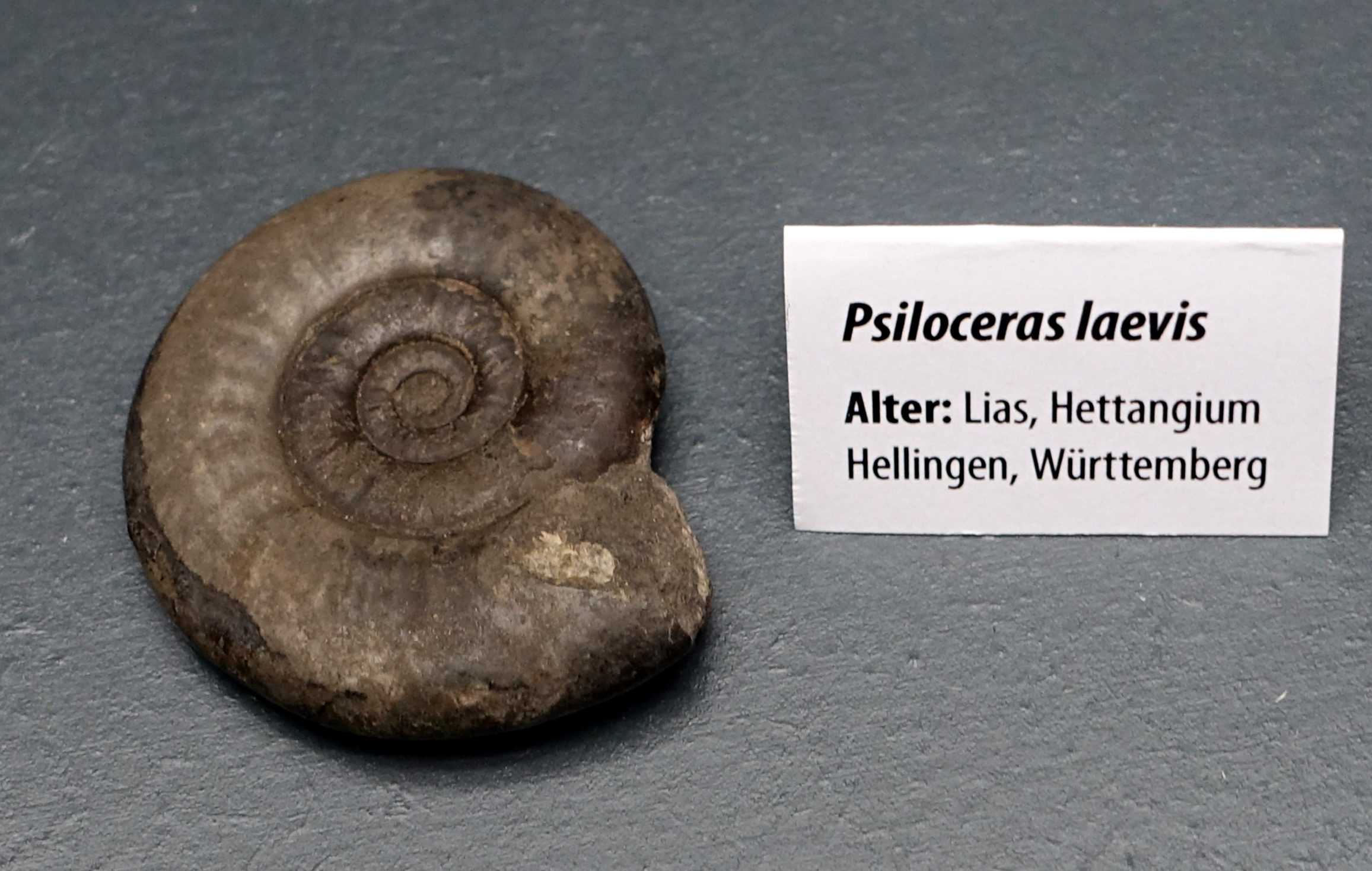
Psiloceras laevis, member of family Psiloceratidae

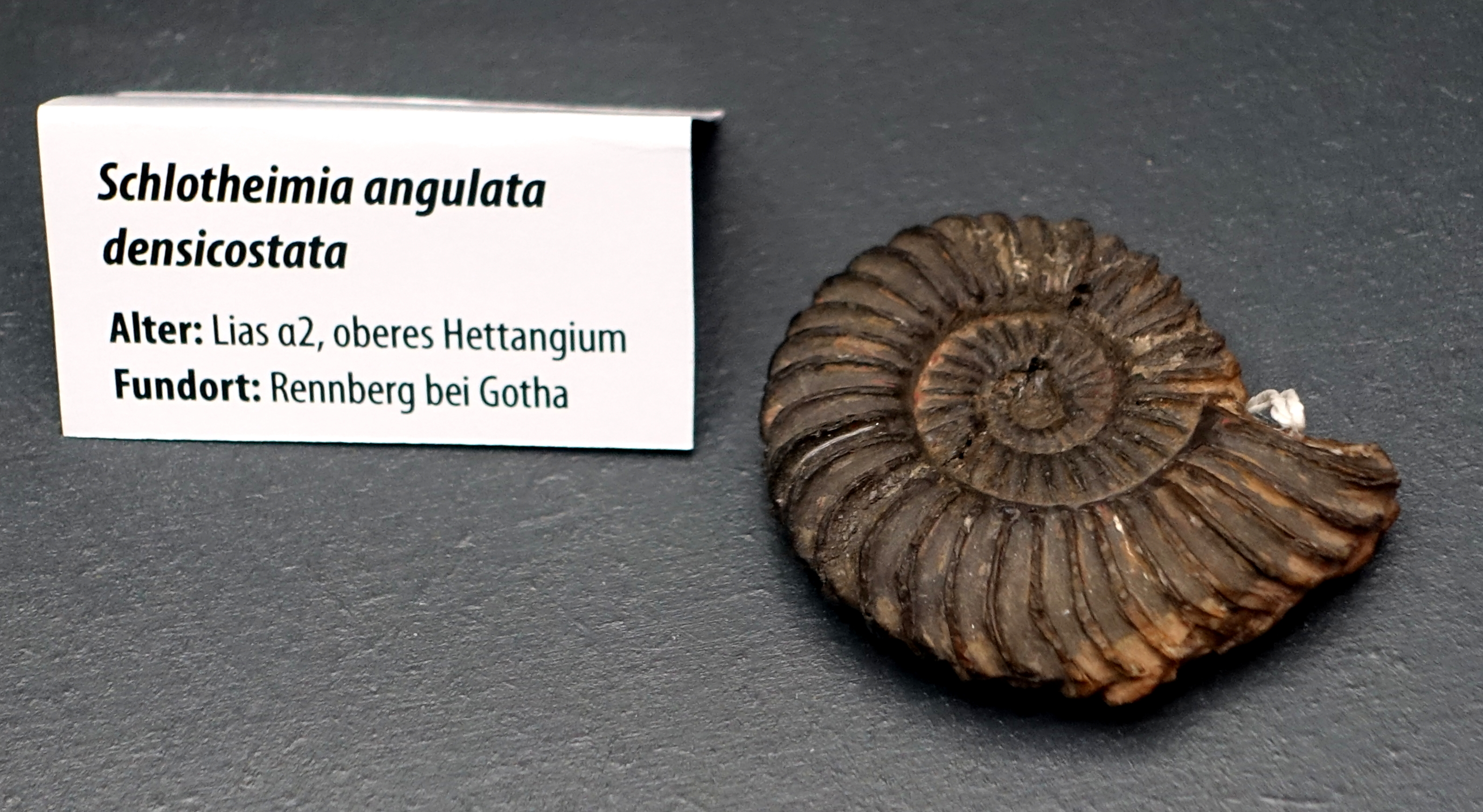
Schlotheimia angulata, member of family Schlotheimiidae

Psiloceratoidea is a superfamily of Early Jurassic ammonoid cephalopods proposed by Hyatt in 1867, assigned to the order Ammonitida. They were very successful during Hettangian and Sinemurian. Last of them, family Cymbitidae and genera Hypoxynoticeras and Radstockiceras survived into Early Pliensbachian.

Psiloceratoidea is probably derived from the family Ussuritidae, which were Triassic members of Phylloceratoidea. Similar to their ancestors, Psiloceratidae kept smooth, rounded venter for whole of their life. Schlotheimiidae were different, as they had ventral chevrons. Rest of the families had angular venter, or keel for at least part of their ontogeny. Most of the members of this superfamily had only simple ribs, but few of them have evolved also secondary ribbing. While some members are involute and some Oxynoticeratidae were oxycone, most of the species were evolute.

== Families ==
- Psiloceratidae - Evolute shells with simple, or missing ribs. An venter, there is no ornament with one exception, as genus Badouxia had weak ventral chevron. Shell is planulate, or serpenticone. Sutures were often asymmetrical and in some genera, saddles were phylloid. They lived in Hettangian and early Sinemurian.
- Schlotheimiidae - Planulate shells that ranged from evolute to involute and had no keel. Ribs were simple and on the venter, they have been forming chevrons. Chevrons might have been interrupted, continuous, or sometimes bifurcating ribs had chevrons absent, or only weakly formed. Most genera could grow more than 30 cm in diameter and in this case, they had mostly smooth outer whorls. Suture had 5 lobes. This family lived in Hettangian and Sinemurian.
- Arietitidae - Evolute shells that could have been both serpenticone, or planulate. Ribs were simple and keel was present at least on the last whorls. Whorld section could have been compressed, subquadrate or even depressed. While frequency of the ribs was usually increasing during ontogeny, on the last whorls of large species, rib frequency drops and ornamentation may degenerate. They have lived in Hettangian and Sinemurian.
- Echioceratidae - Serpenticone shells with keel, that can be surrounded by grooves in the case of densely ribbed, compressed species. Whorl section is circular, or with flat sides. Ribs are simple and strong with the exception of Leptechioceras that had strongly compressed whorl section on outer whorls and these were also smooth. Initial ontogenical stage is smooth, but very short. Tubercules were present in few species. Members of this family lived in Sinemurian.
- Oxynoticeratidae - Oxycone or planulate species, that have been involute, or moderately evolute. Ribs were falcoid or projected and sometimes, even secondary ribs existed. Ribbing have been disappearing on older specimens. Keel was mostly present, but there were no ventral grooves. This family have existed during upper Sinemurian and lower Pliensbachian.
- Cymbitidae - Probably monogeneric family with sphaeroconic involute inner whorls that later during ontogeny become evolute and last whorl is highly eccentric. They were small and mostly less than 2 cm in diameter. Venter is smooth, fastigate or rounded. There was constriction on aperture. Ornamentation was weak, as shell was smooth or plicate and only rarely, there were lateral tubercules. Cymbitidae lived in Sinemurian and Pliensbachian.
