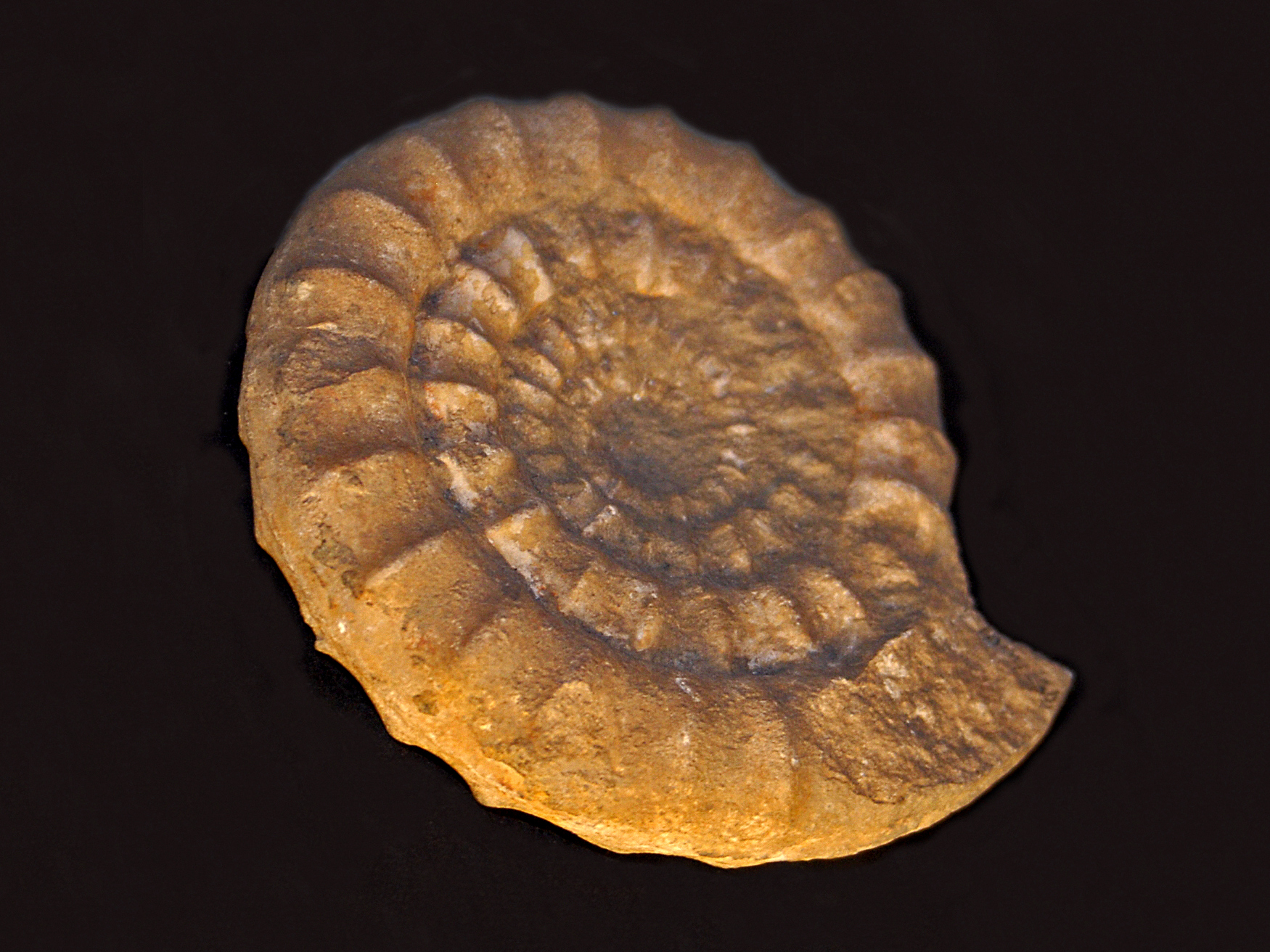
- Fossil shells of Echioceras raricostatum from Pierreclos (France), on display at Galerie de paléontologie et d'anatomie comparée in Paris

Scientific classification
- Kingdom: Animalia
- Phylum: Mollusca
- Class: Cephalopoda
- Subclass: †Ammonoidea
- Order: †Ammonitida
- Suborder: †Ammonitina
- Superfamily: †Psiloceratoidea
- Family: †Echioceratidae; Buckman, 1913

= Echioceratidae =

Echioceratidae Temporal range: Sinemurian, 196.5– 189.6 Ma

Extinct family of ammonites

Echioceratidae is an extinct family of ammonites that lived during Sinemurian stage of Early Jurassic.

== Description ==
Ammonites belonging to this family are characterised by serpenticone shells with a keel, which can be surrounded by grooves if a species is densely ribbed and compressed. The whorl section is either circular or has flat sides. Ribs are simple and strong with the exception of Leptechioceras which instead possessed a strongly compressed, smooth outer whorl. The initial ontogenical stage of these ammonites is typically smooth but very short. Tubercules are represented in a few genera within this group.

== Genera and subgenera ==
Following genera are members of this family:

- Palaeoechioceras Spath, 1929
- Gagaticeras Buckman, 1913
- Plesechioceras Trueman and Williams, 1925
- Orthechioceras Trueman and Williams, 1925
- Echioceras Bayle, 1878
- Paltechioceras Buckman, 1924
- Leptechioceras Buckman, 1923
  - L. (Leptechioceras)
  - L. (Neomicroceras) Donovan, 1966

== Distribution ==
Fossils of species within this family have been found in the Jurassic rocks of north Africa, South and North America, Europe and Asia.
