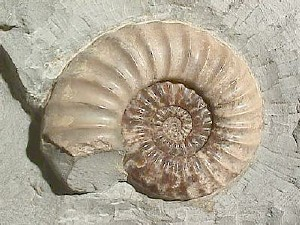
- Asteroceras fossil from Dorset, England.

Scientific classification
- Kingdom: Animalia
- Phylum: Mollusca
- Class: Cephalopoda
- Subclass: †Ammonoidea
- Order: †Ammonitida
- Family: †Arietitidae
- Subfamily: †Asteroceratinae
- Genus: †Asteroceras; Hyatt, 1867

= Asteroceras =

Asteroceras Temporal range: Late Triassic-Early Jurassic 205.6–189.6 Ma

Genus of molluscs (fossil)

Asteroceras (from Ancient Greek ἀστήρ (astḗr), meaning "star", and κέρας (kéras), meaning "horn") is an extinct genus of cephalopod belonging to the Ammonite subclass. These fast-moving nektonic carnivores lived during the Triassic and Jurassic periods (from 205.6 to 189.6 Ma).

== Species ==
- Asteroceras blakei Spath, 1925
- Asteroceras confusum Spath, 1925
- Asteroceras dommerguesi Zaitsev, 2023
- Asteroceras obtusum (Sowerby, 1817)
- Asteroceras reynesi Fucini, 1903
- Asteroceras saltriensis Parona, 1896
- Asteroceras smithii (Sowerby, 1814)
- Asteroceras stellare (Sowerby 1815)
- Asteroceras turneri (Sowerby, 1814)

== Distribution ==
Asteroceras fossils may be found in the Jurassic marine strata of Canada, China, Germany, Hong Kong, Hungary, Peru, and Turkey, in the Triassic of United States and at Lyme Regis in the Asteroceras obtusum zone of Upper Sinemurian age.
