= Hypoxynoticeras =

Hypoxynoticeras Temporal range: Pliensbachian

Scientific classification
- Kingdom: Animalia
- Phylum: Mollusca
- Class: Cephalopoda
- Subclass: †Ammonoidea
- Order: †Ammonitida
- Family: †Oxynoticeratidae
- Genus: †Hypoxynoticeras; Spath, 1925

Type species
- Ammonites sphenonotus Monke, 1888

Species
- Hypoxynoticeras sphenonotum Monke, 1888

Genus of molluscs (fossil)

Hypoxynoticeras is an extinct genus of lower Jurassic ammonite that lived during Jamesoni zone of lower Pliensbachian. Animals belonging to this genus had small platycone shells, of which umbilicus made 25–30% of diameter. Keel was strong and ventrolateral shoulders were prominent. It is possible, that it was just a microconch, or juvenile of Radstockiceras.

== Distribution ==
Fossils belonging to this genus were found in northern Germany, Poland, western Scotland and in England.
