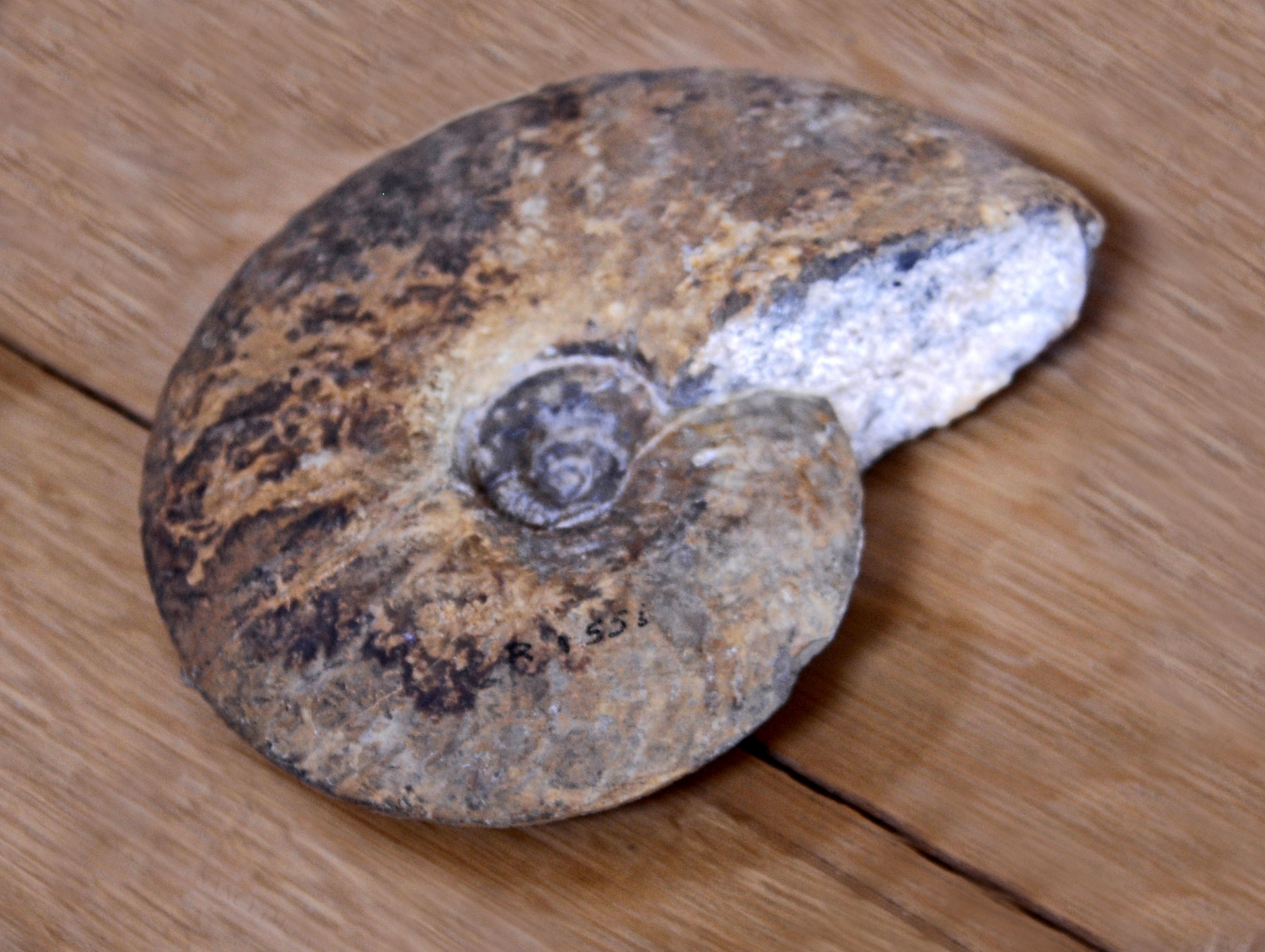
- Fossil of Gleviceras guabalianum from France, on display at Galerie de paléontologie et d'anatomie comparée in Paris

Scientific classification
- Kingdom: Animalia
- Phylum: Mollusca
- Class: Cephalopoda
- Subclass: †Ammonoidea
- Order: †Ammonitida
- Suborder: †Ammonitina
- Superfamily: †Psiloceratoidea
- Family: †Oxynoticeratidae; Hyatt, 1875

= Oxynoticeratidae =

Oxynoticeratidae Temporal range: Early Jurassic, 196.5–186.7 Ma

Extinct family of ammonites

Oxynoticeratidae is a family of true ammonites (order Ammonitida) included in the superfamily Psiloceratoidea.

Oxynoticeratids have a broad, worldwide distribution but a narrow stratigraphic one, being known only from the Upper Sinemurian and Lower Pliensbachian, during which their shells changed little in form.

== Genera ==
- Cheltonia Buckman, 1904
- Gleviceras Buckman, 1918
- Hypoxynoticeras Spath, 1925
- Oxynoticeras Hyatt, 1875
- Paracymbites Spath, 1925
- Paroxynoticeras Pia, 1914
- Radstockiceras Buckman, 1918
- Slatterites Spath, 1923

== Description ==
These cephalopds, as the other species in the superfamily Psiloceratoidea, are usually characterized by mostly involute, oxyconic shells with narrow venter and compressed, lanceolate whorl section. The suture line is of ammonitic type. Ribbing is feeble, hardly functional and often absent.

They have developed shorter body chambers than in the ancestral Arietitidae, resulting in more stable floating positions. Their mostly smooth, knife-edge discoidal forms would have allowed for quick, though probably no sustained, movement through the water.

== Distribution ==
Fossils of species within this genus have been found in the Jurassic sediments of Argentina, Canada, China, France, Hungary, Italy, Mexico, Morocco, Spain, Turkey and United Kingdom.
