= Slatterites =

Slatterites Temporal range: Sinemurian

Scientific classification
- Kingdom: Animalia
- Phylum: Mollusca
- Class: Cephalopoda
- Subclass: †Ammonoidea
- Order: †Ammonitida
- Family: †Oxynoticeratidae
- Genus: †Slatterites; Spath, 1923

Type species
- Aegoceras slatteri Wright, 1882

Species
- Slatterites slatteri Wright, 1882

Genus of molluscs (fossil)

Slatterites is an extinct genus of lower Jurassic ammonite that lived during upper Sinemurian. Animals belonging to this genus had small shells that had oxycone whorl section and sharp venter when young. In the case of older specimens, whorl section becomes oval and venter is round. This change is very quick. Last whorl is decorated by blunt ribs that can be alternating on opposite sides. Suture is by broad and simple elements similar to suture of Eparietites.

== Distribution ==
Fossils belonging to this genus were found in England.
