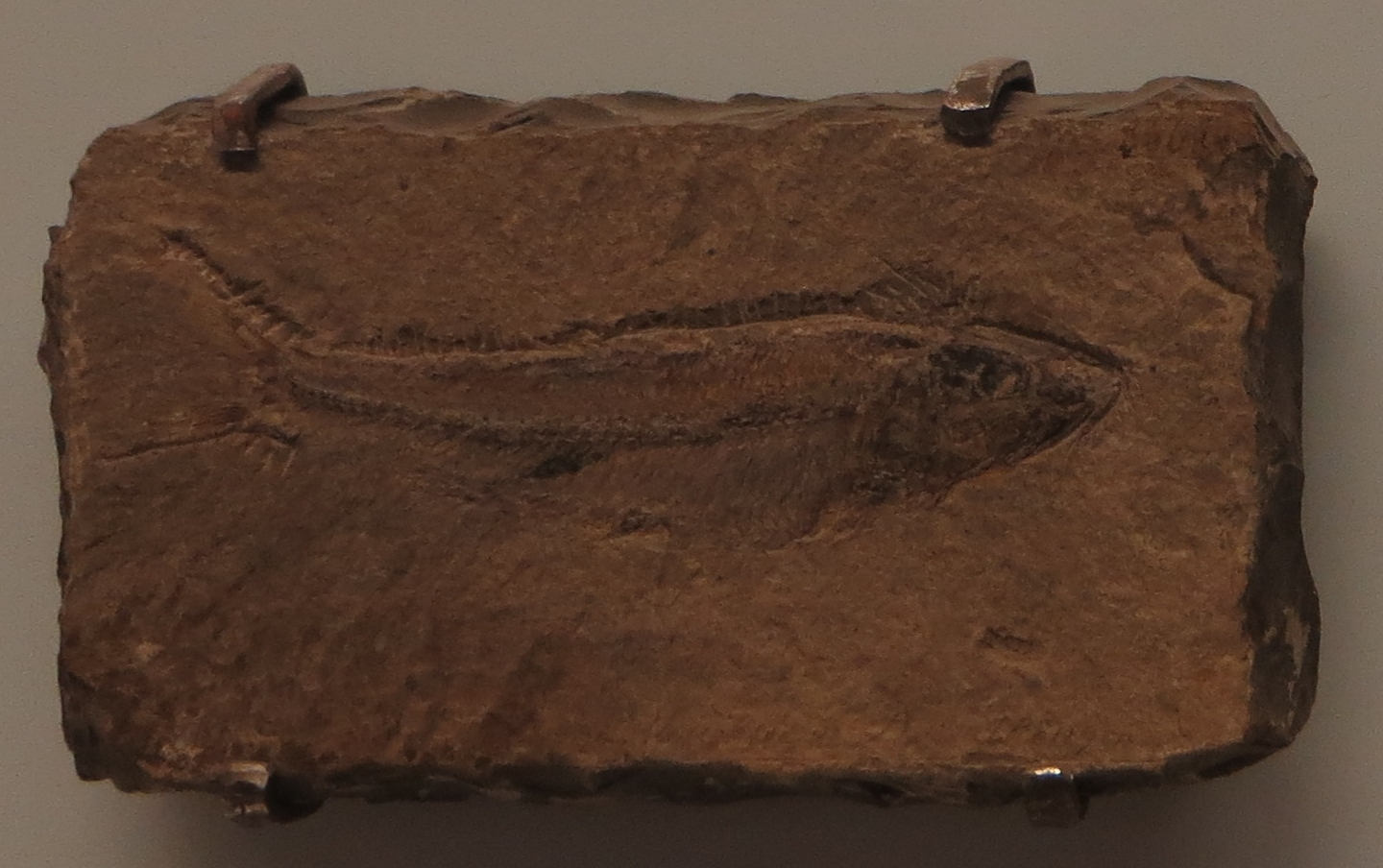
- Fossil of Leptolepis coryphaenoides

Scientific classification
- Kingdom: Animalia
- Phylum: Chordata
- Class: Actinopterygii
- Order: †Leptolepiformes
- Family: †Leptolepidae; Nicholson & Lydekker, 1889

Genera
- †Leptolepis (type genus); †Longileptolepis; †Proleptolepis

= Leptolepidae =

Leptolepidae Temporal range: Sinemurian–Callovian

Extinct family of ray-finned fishes

Leptolepidae (also Leptolepididae) is an extinct family of herring-like stem-teleost fish found throughout the world during the Jurassic. They were among the first fish to possess certain teleost synapomorphies, such as cycloid scales and fully ossified vertebrae.
