= Cheltonia =

Cheltonia Temporal range: Sinemurian

Scientific classification
- Kingdom: Animalia
- Phylum: Mollusca
- Class: Cephalopoda
- Subclass: †Ammonoidea
- Order: †Ammonitida
- Family: †Oxynoticeratidae
- Genus: †Cheltonia; Buckman, 1904

Type species
- Ammonites accipitris Buckman, 1844

Species
- Cheltonia accipitris Buckman, 1844; Cheltonia galeata Hoffmann, 1944; Cheltonia oustense Rakús & Guex, 2002

Genus of molluscs (fossil)

Cheltonia is an extinct genus of ammonite from the Upper Sinemurian substage of Lower Jurassic of Europe, Africa, and America. It is probably a microconch of genus Oxynoticeras.

== Description ==
Ammonites belonging to this genus had small platyconic shell, on which the last whorl has been eccentrically coiled. Ventral rostrum could be preceded by 3 to 5 crawlings. Umbilicus took about 30—40% of diameter. Ribs were falcoid and weak. Suture has been the same as in the case of young Oxynoticeras.
