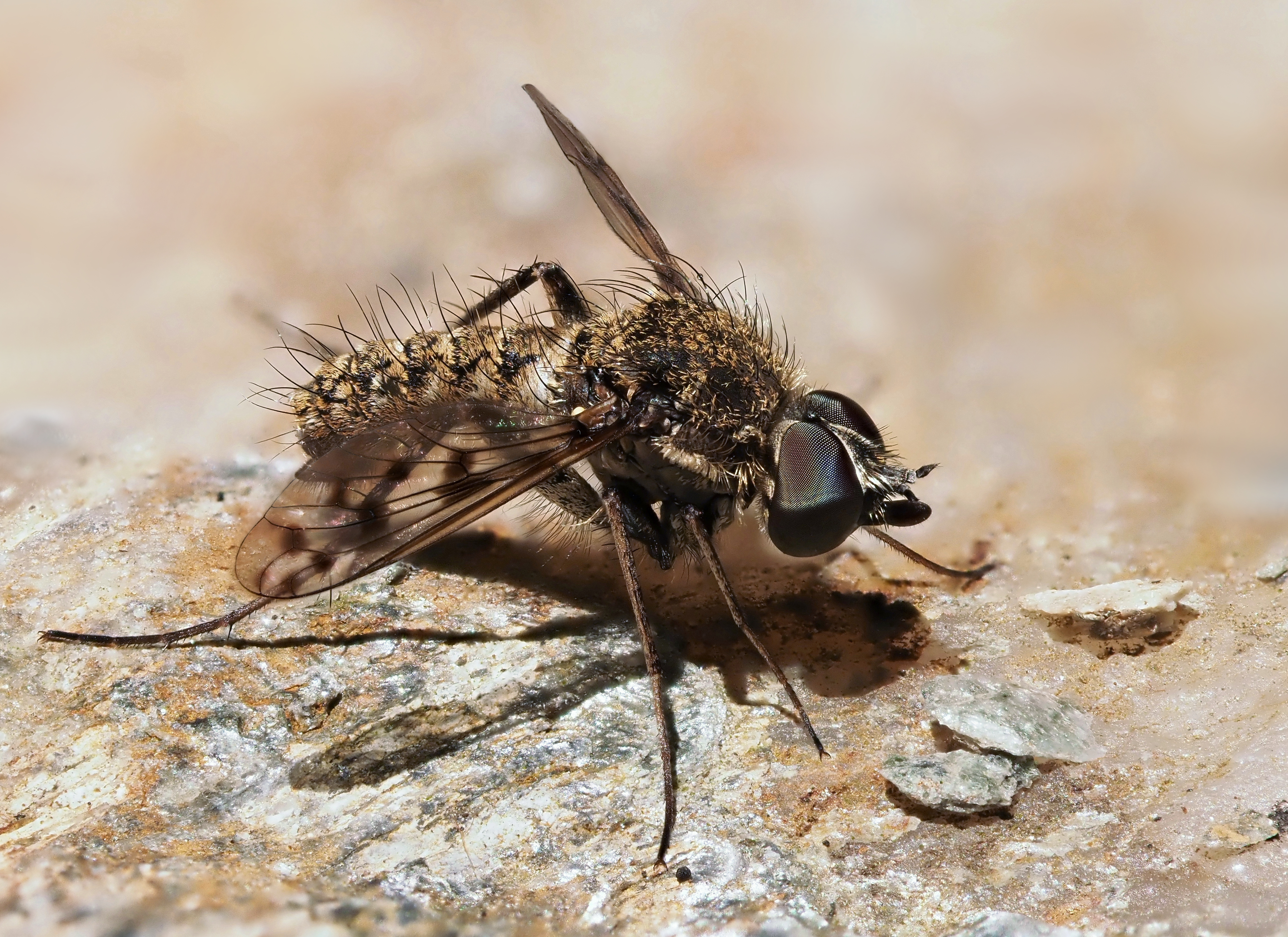
- Cyllenia rustica

Scientific classification
- Kingdom: Animalia
- Phylum: Arthropoda
- Clade: Pancrustacea
- Class: Insecta
- Order: Diptera
- Family: Bombyliidae
- Subfamily: Cythereinae; Becker, 1913

= Cythereinae =

Subfamily of flies

Cythereinae is a subfamily of bee flies in the family Bombyliidae. There are about 19 genera and 150 species in Cythereinae.

== Genera ==
These 19 genera belong to the subfamily Cythereinae:

- Amictus Wiedemann, 1817^{c g}
- Callostoma Macquart, 1840^{c g}
- Chalcochiton Loew, 1844^{c g}
- Cyllenia Latreille, 1802^{c g}
- Cytherea Fabricius, 1794^{c g}
- Enica Macquart, 1834^{c g}
- Gyrocraspedum Becker, 1912^{c g}
- Neosardus Roberts, 1929^{c g}
- Nomalonia Rondani, 1863^{c g}
- Pantarbes Osten Sacken, 1877^{i c g b}
- Sericosoma Macquart, 1850^{c g}
- Sericothrix Hall, 1976^{c g}
- Sinaia Hermann, 1909^{c g}
- Sphenoidoptera Williston, 1901^{i c g}
- † Amictites Hennig, 1966^{g}
- † Glaesamictus Hennig, 1966^{g}
- † Palaeoamictus Meunier, 1916^{g}
- † Paleolomatia Nel, 2008^{g}
- † Praecytherea Théobald, 1937^{g}

Data sources: i = ITIS, c = Catalogue of Life, g = GBIF, b = Bugguide.net
