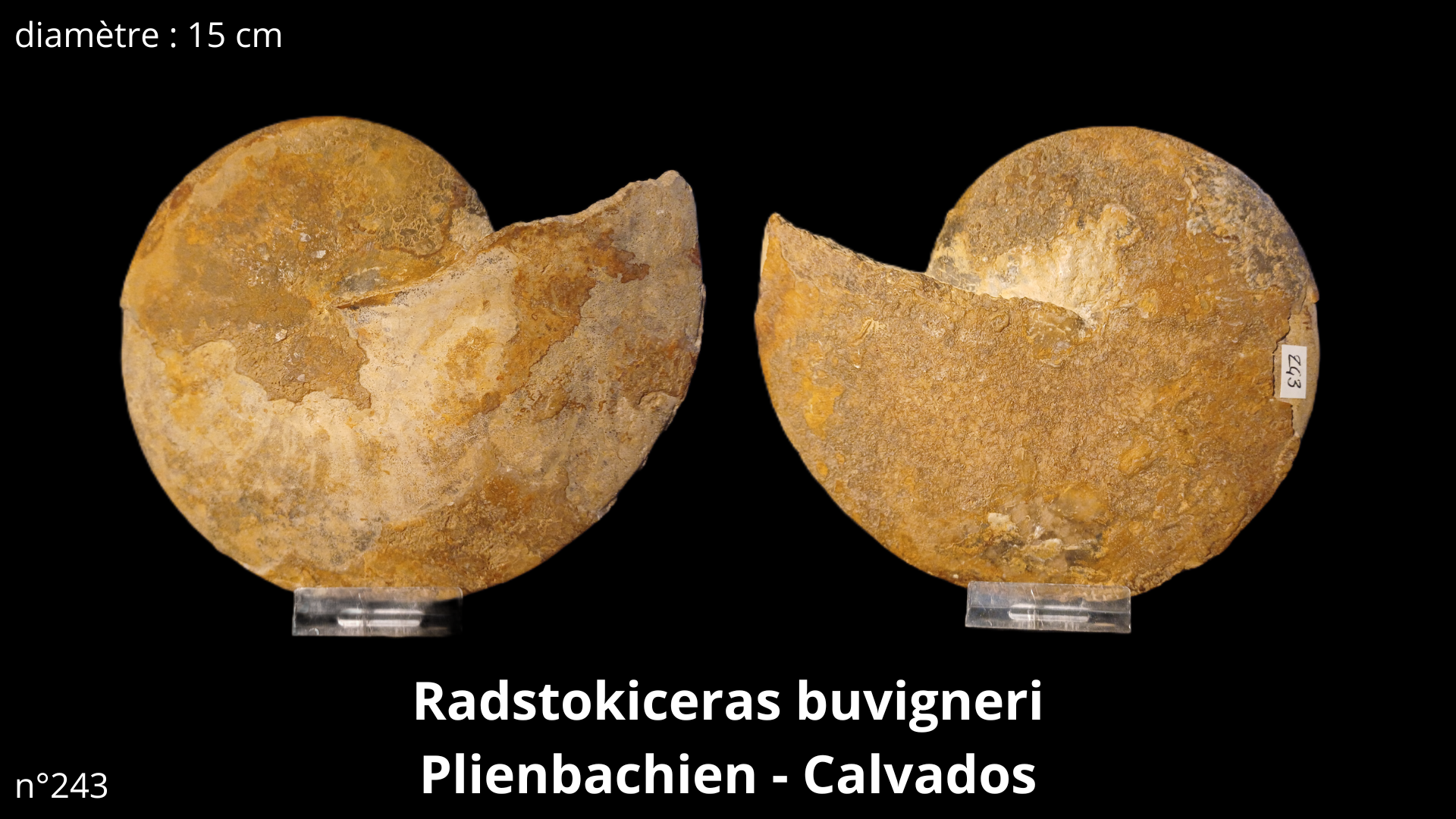
- Radstockiceras buvigneri

Scientific classification
- Kingdom: Animalia
- Phylum: Mollusca
- Class: Cephalopoda
- Subclass: †Ammonoidea
- Order: †Ammonitida
- Family: †Oxynoticeratidae
- Genus: †Radstockiceras; Buckman, 1918

Type species
- Radstockiceras complicatum Buckman, 1918

Species
- Radstockiceras buvigneri d'Orbigny, 1844; Radstockiceras complanosum Simpson, 1855; Radstockiceras complicatum Buckman, 1918; Radstockiceras coynarti d'Orbigny, 1844; Radstockiceras fastigatum Venturi et al, 2005; Radstockiceras gemmellaroi Pompeckj, 1906; Radstockiceras hechingense Schlatter, 1980; Radstockiceras involutum Pompeckj, 1906; Radstockiceras lynx d'Orbigny, 1844; Radstockiceras oscensis Rivas, 1977; Radstockiceras pseudosaemanni Rivas, 1977; Radstockiceras wiltshirei Wright, 1881

Synonyms
- Fastigiceras Buckman, 1919; Retenticeras Buckman, 1920; Metoxynoticeras Spath, 1922; Phylloxynoticeras Buckman, 1924; Homoxynoticeras Buckman, 1925; Kleistoxynoticeras Buckman, 1925; Carixiceras Spath, 1925; Radstokiceras Roman, 1938; Oxynoticeroides Dommergues et al, 1986

= Radstockiceras =

Radstockiceras Temporal range: Sinemurian–Pliensbachian

Genus of molluscs (fossil)

Radstockiceras is an extinct genus of lower Jurassic ammonite that lived from Oxynotum zone of upper Sinemurian to Raricostatum zone of lower Pliensbachian. Shells of these animals were oxycone and involute with umbilicus that took maximum of 12% of diameter in the case of outer whorls. On inner whorls, venter has been sharp, but then it became rounded. Faint ribs had falcoid shape, but sometimes, ribs could absent. Shells could have been large in their size. Suture has been very complex, similar to Oxynoticeras, but culmination at umbilical margin has been missing. Genus has been named after town of Radstock, in Somerset.

== Distribution ==
Fossils belonging to this genus are found in Europe, South America, North Africa and Turkey.
