= Paracymbites =

Paracymbites Temporal range: Sinemurian

Scientific classification
- Kingdom: Animalia
- Phylum: Mollusca
- Class: Cephalopoda
- Subclass: †Ammonoidea
- Order: †Ammonitida
- Family: †Oxynoticeratidae
- Genus: †Paracymbites; Spath, 1925

Type species
- Ammonites dennyi Simpson, 1843

Species
- Paracymbites dennyi Simpson, 1843; Paracymbites dennyiformis Rakús & Guex, 2002

Genus of molluscs (fossil)

Paracymbites is an extinct genus of lower Jurassic ammonite that lived during Raricostatum zone of upper Sinemurian. Animals belonging to this genus had small shells with semicircular whorl section and rounded or fastigate venter, of which umbilicus made about 25% of diameter. Last whorl could have been excentric. Keel was faint and it might have been only on the earlier part of the last whorl. Aperture had ventral rostrum. Body chamber made about 75% of whorl and was faintly plicate, or smooth.

== Distribution ==
Fossils belonging to this genus were found in Great Britain, Tunisia and Morocco.
