= Proleptolepis =

Scientific classification
- Kingdom: Animalia
- Phylum: Chordata
- Class: Actinopterygii
- Order: †Leptolepiformes
- Family: †Leptolepidae
- Genus: †Proleptolepis; Nybelin, 1974

Species
- †P. elongata Nybelin, 1974; †P. furcata Nybelin, 1974; †P. megalops Nybelin, 1974

Extinct genus of ray-finned fishes

Proleptolepis is an extinct genus of ray-finned fish belonging to the family Leptolepidae.

== See also ==
- List of prehistoric bony fish genera
