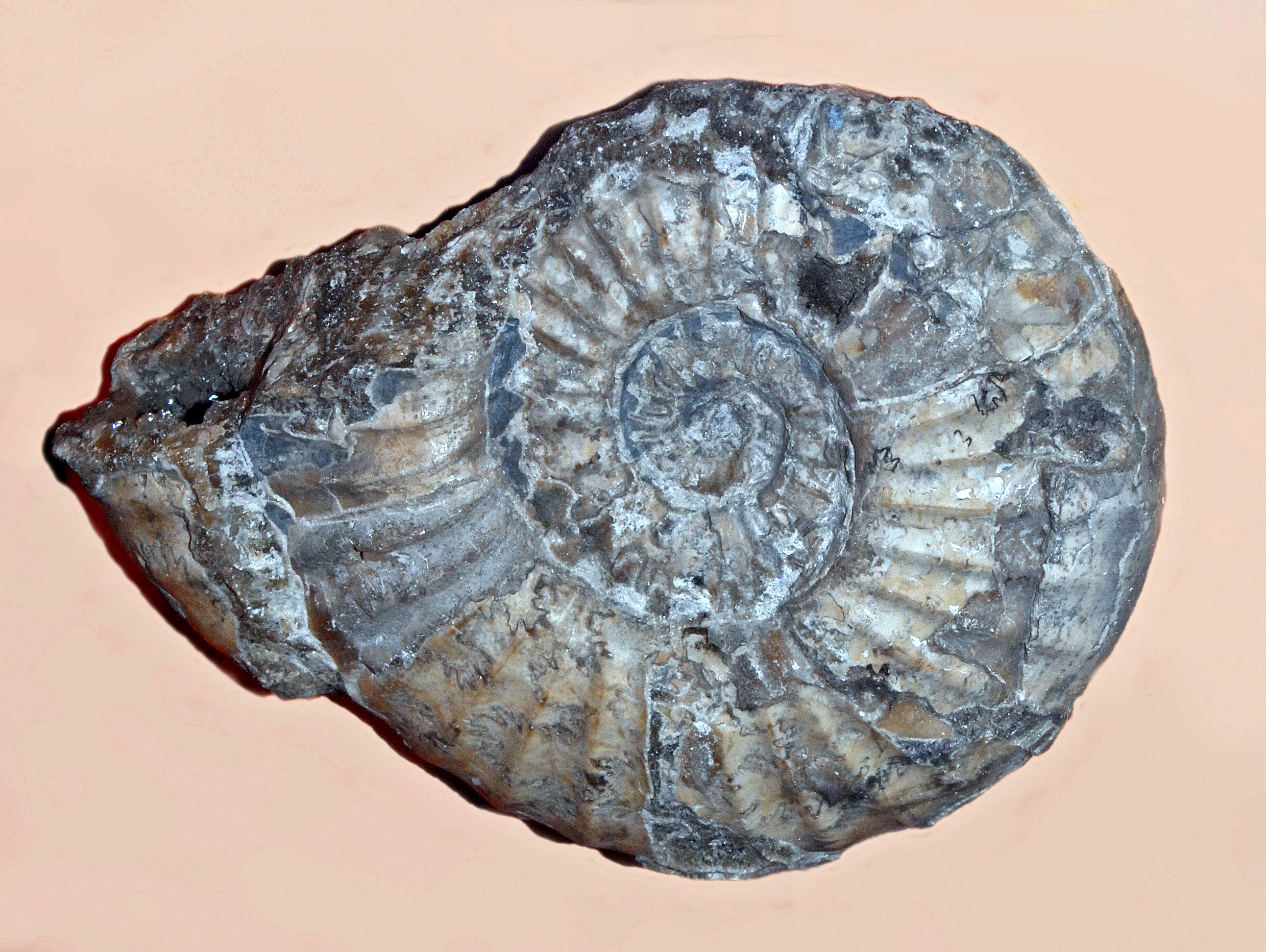
- Asteroceras stellare

Scientific classification
- Domain: Eukaryota
- Kingdom: Animalia
- Phylum: Mollusca
- Class: Cephalopoda
- Subclass: †Ammonoidea
- Order: †Ammonitida
- Superfamily: †Psiloceratoidea
- Family: †Arietitidae; Hyatt, 1874

Subfamilies
- Alsatitinae; Arietitinae; Agassiceratinae; Pseudotropitinae; Asteroceratinae; Hypasteroceratinae

= Arietitidae =

Arietitidae Temporal range: Lower Jurassic, Sinemurian–Pliensbachian

Extinct family of ammonites

Arietitidae is a family of true ammonites that make up part of the superfamily Psiloceratoidea, named after the type genus Arietites. They comprise medium-size to large or gigantic genera which in general are strongly ribbed, tuberculate in some, with keeled or grooved and keeled venters, and well differentiated ammonitic sutures. The aptycus is single valved with a shiny, concentrically striated surface.

Arietitidae dominated Lower Jurassic, Sinemurian ammonites, worldwide, extending into the lower Pliensbachian.

The Arietitidae may have their origin in the Schlotheimiidae if not directly from the Psiloceratidae, and is the probably source for the Oxynoticeratidae.
