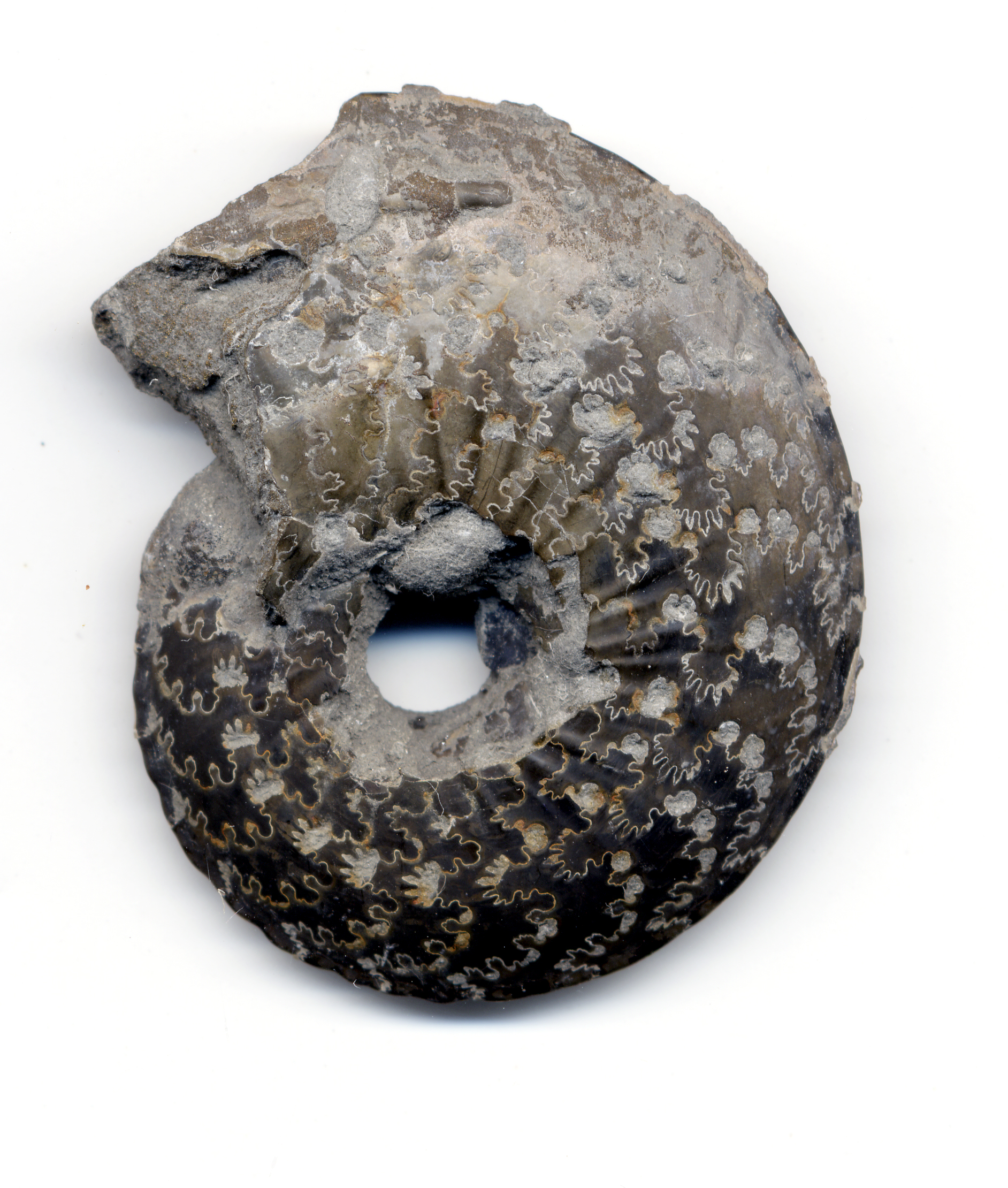
- Oxynoticeras oxynotum from Lower Lias rocks at Bishops Cleeve in Gloucestershire, England, UK

Scientific classification
- Kingdom: Animalia
- Phylum: Mollusca
- Class: Cephalopoda
- Subclass: †Ammonoidea
- Order: †Ammonitida
- Family: †Oxynoticeratidae
- Genus: †Oxynoticeras; Hyatt, 1875

Type species
- Ammonites oxynotus Quenstedt, 1843

Species
- Oxynoticeras oxynotum (Quenstedt, 1843); Oxynoticeras subinvolutum Spath, 1925; Oxynoticeras soemanni Dumortier, 1867; Oxynoticeras lymense Wright, 1881; Oxynoticeras choffati Pompeckj, 1906

Synonyms
- Oxynotoceras Buckman, 1894

= Oxynoticeras =

Oxynoticeras Temporal range: Sinemurian

Genus of molluscs (fossil)

Oxynoticeras is an extinct genus of ammonite from the Early Jurassic of Europe and North America. This genus is characterized by its smooth shell, with almost invisible undulations on the flank, and a sharp keel.

Synonym Oxynotoceras was created by Buckman as misspelling.

== Distribution ==
Fossils belonging to this genus were found in Europe, Morocco, Asia, Canada, USA and South America.
