= Calcaires du Bou Dahar =

Geologic formation in Morocco

- Stratigraphic range: Sinemurian–Toarcian 196–183 Ma
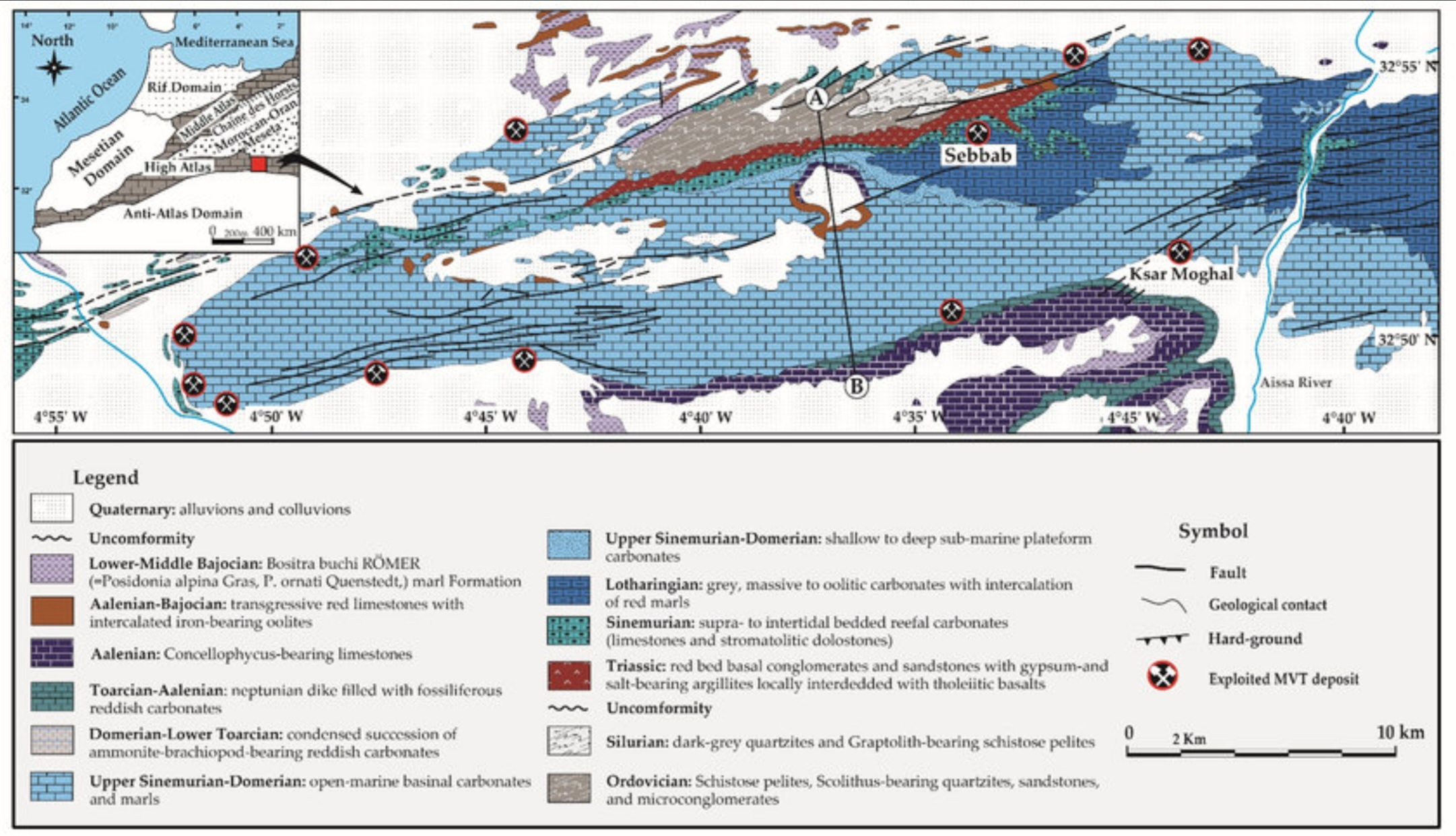
- Shape, lithology and location within Morocco of the Bou Dahar platform
- Type: Geological formation
- Underlies: Tagoudite Formation
- Overlies: Central Atlantic Magmatic Province igneous rocks
- Area: Bni Tadjite
- Thickness: >450 m

Lithology
- Primary: limestone

Location
- Location: High Atlas
- Coordinates: 32.3°N 3.5°W
- Approximate paleocoordinates: 25.6°N 1.3°W
- Country: Morocco

Type section
- Thickness at type section: ~360 m (1,180 ft)
- Calcaires du Bou Dahar (Morocco)

The Calcaires du Bou Dahar (also known as Djebel Bou Dahar Paleoshoal, Djebel Bou Dahar, Calcaires du Bou Dahar Formation, or Bou Dahar Formation) is a geological formation or a sequence of formations of Late Sinemurian to Pliensbachian-Toarcian boundary (Early Jurassic) age in Bni Tadjite, the Central High Atlas, Morocco. This unit represents an excepcional record of an evolving reef complex (mountain laterals), platform slopes (Steep slopes between 20° and 35° on various sides) and a emerged shoal (nearly horizontal limestone layers on the top flat Bou Dahar plateau) developed inside a carbonate platform, recording the evolutionary cycles of this environment with notorious precision, also yielding what is considered one of the greatest/most diverse marine biotas of the entire Jurassic Tethys Ocean. The Bou Dahar carbonate platform shoal stands prominently and structurally above surrounding plains, spanning 35–40 km in length and 4–15 km in width, with a relief of 100–450 m. This carbonate formation originated on metamorphosed Silurian to Ordovician siliciclastic rocks and tholeiitic volcanic layers tied to Central Atlantic Magmatic Province basalts, forming a corridor oriented WSW to ENE. Surrounding alluvial plains expose green marls, shales, and dark lime-mudstones representing basinal deposits contemporaneous or subsequent to the platform. It has been considered to be a sequence of different coeval inner geological formations, including the Foum Zidet Formation, the Aganane Formation and Ouchbis Formation, but is usually interpreted as a single major unit due to it´s unique preservation.

== Economic importance ==
Lead, Zinc, and Baryte mining in the Bou Dahar district relies solely on artisanal methods managed by the public "CADETAF" cooperative. The cooperative’s claim area, spanning 60,000 km^{2} across the central and eastern High Atlas, along with exploration licenses held by ManagemGroup, together constitute North Africa’s largest calamine region. Data from CADETAF and ManagemGroup reveal over 1 million tons of zinc ore with more than 30% ZnO content extracted to date, including 559,403 tons of 16% Zn ore produced by ManagemGroup from 2012 to 2019.

== Sequence evolution ==
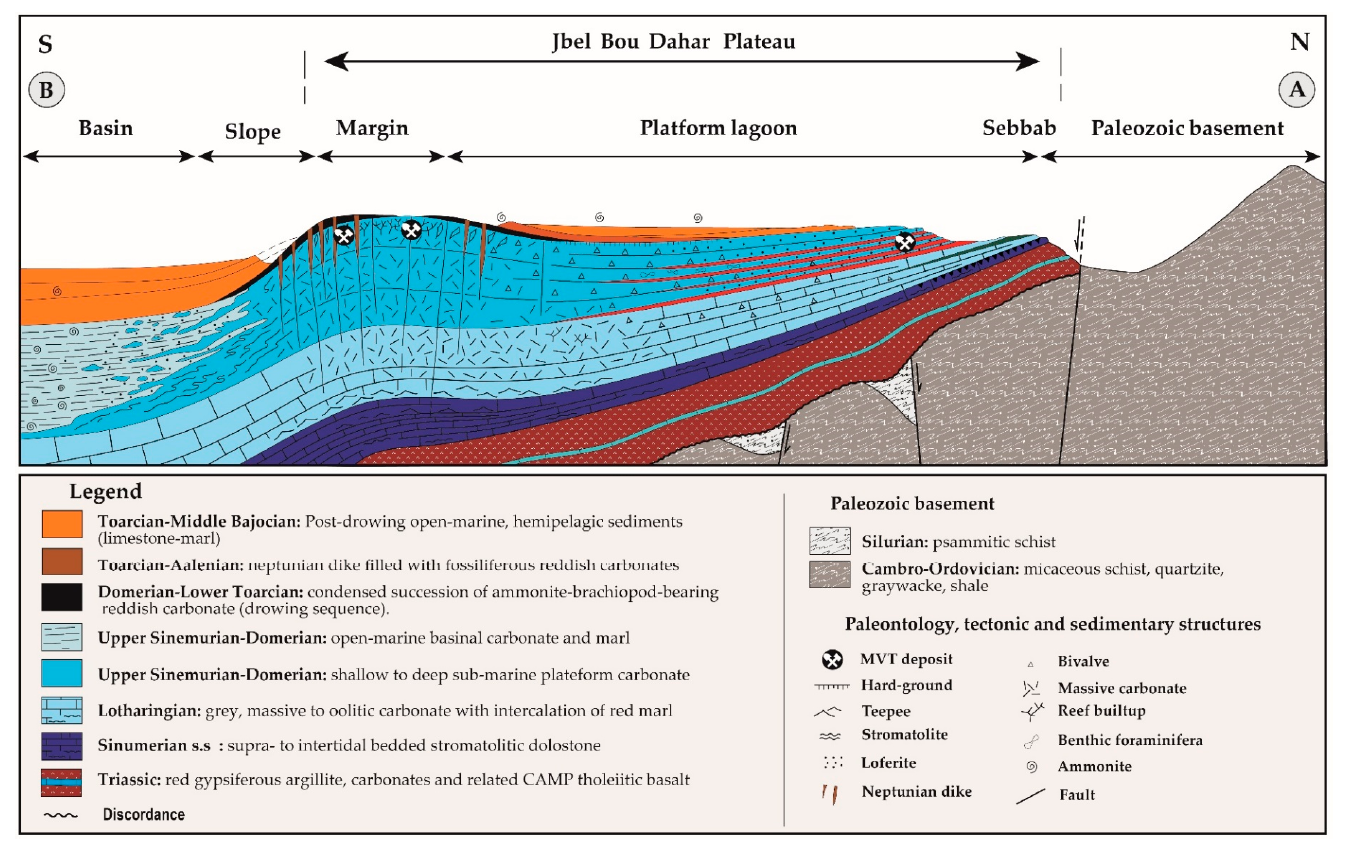
Succession of depositional sequences in the Bou Dahar platform

The Bou Dahar platform is a well-preserved example of carbonate platform development within a tectonically active rift-basin environment. This region formed as part of the Jurassic High Atlas seaway, where tectonic activity shaped the basin, with influences from rifting, faulting, and transtensional forces. Early studies mapped the area’s Jurassic marine environments, with carbonate platform margins situated alongside deeper basin limestones. This platform records two primary periods of shallow-water carbonate growth: one during the Lower to Middle Liassic (Sinemurian to Domerian) and a subsequent phase spanning the Upper Liassic to Lower Dogger (Aalenian to Bajocian). However, only the earlier phase is preserved in Djebel Bou Dahar. This phase was abruptly interrupted at the Domerian-Toarcian transition, marked by the onlap of Toarcian shales and Aalenian lime mudstones over the platform, signaling a shift to deeper marine conditions.

The seismic modeling of Bou Dahar platform highlighted large-scale structures, such as the platform's form and the boundary marking its submergence, across various frequencies and modeling approaches. Lower-frequency wavelets emphasized truncation of layers and outward shifts in onlap points. In contrast, internal platform facies zones were less distinct at frequencies below 50 Hz, but with a geometry still discernible through disturbances in reflections, especially near the lower boundaries, with image-ray migration models proving more responsive to these subtle variations even at lower frequencies. Seismic contrast, driven by differences in acoustic impedance, tends to decline with deeper burial and subsequent diagenesis, with peak resolution typically present at initial deposition stages before significant burial effects.

Sequences I–II overlie CAMP basalts, spanning over 126 and 150 meters, marked by a dolomite-rich boundary featuring fenestral and stromatolitic structures, which indicate transgressive-regressive (T-R) cycles. Dominance of subtidal carbonates suggests extensive shallow marine conditions across the platform. Early dolomitization preserved the fine microstructures within these sequences, aligning with the Hettangian-Lower Sinemurian Idikel Formation.

Sequence III developed as a low-relief carbonate platform and varies in slope angle between northern and southern margins, with thickness peaking in northeastern synclines at around 100 meters. Thinning toward the center, it comprises laterally continuous skeletal and packstone deposits interspersed with sponge mounds, mirroring the Foum Zidet Formation.

Sequence IV with a wedge-shaped geometry, reveals steep slopes and retrogradational stacking, indicating subaerial exposure at its base with ammonite-rich wackestone beds. This sequence thickens at the southern margin, where coral and sponge boundstones, extending to 140 meters, transition into grainstone and packstone accumulations along the slope. The eastern platform edge hosts cross-bedded grainstone layers, lacking intertidal deposits, characteristic of open-marine conditions.

Sequence V, along Sequences IV to VI correlate with the Aganane Formation and Ouchbis Formations, being a progradational wedge, is thickest along the platform's southern and eastern edges, forming a concave-up clinoform structure, reaching 50–70 meters in height and indicating alternating subtidal and intertidal lithofacies and evidence of exposure events. Moving basinward, finer basinal sediments with green marls and peloidal wackestones emerge, suggesting periodic sediment starvation during the Early Pliensbachian.

The final sequence, Sequence VI, fills the last stage of platform development with angular unconformity over older layers and CAMP basalts. This sequence encompasses varied facies belts surrounding a central paleo-high with subtidal and intertidal deposits, coated-grain bars, and coastal-plain sediments like red shales and calcretes. Clinoforms along the lower slope show a concave-up profile that flattens basinward, with deposits consolidating into a fan along the southern margin, evidence of sediment redistribution likely from mass wasting.

== Paleoenvironment ==
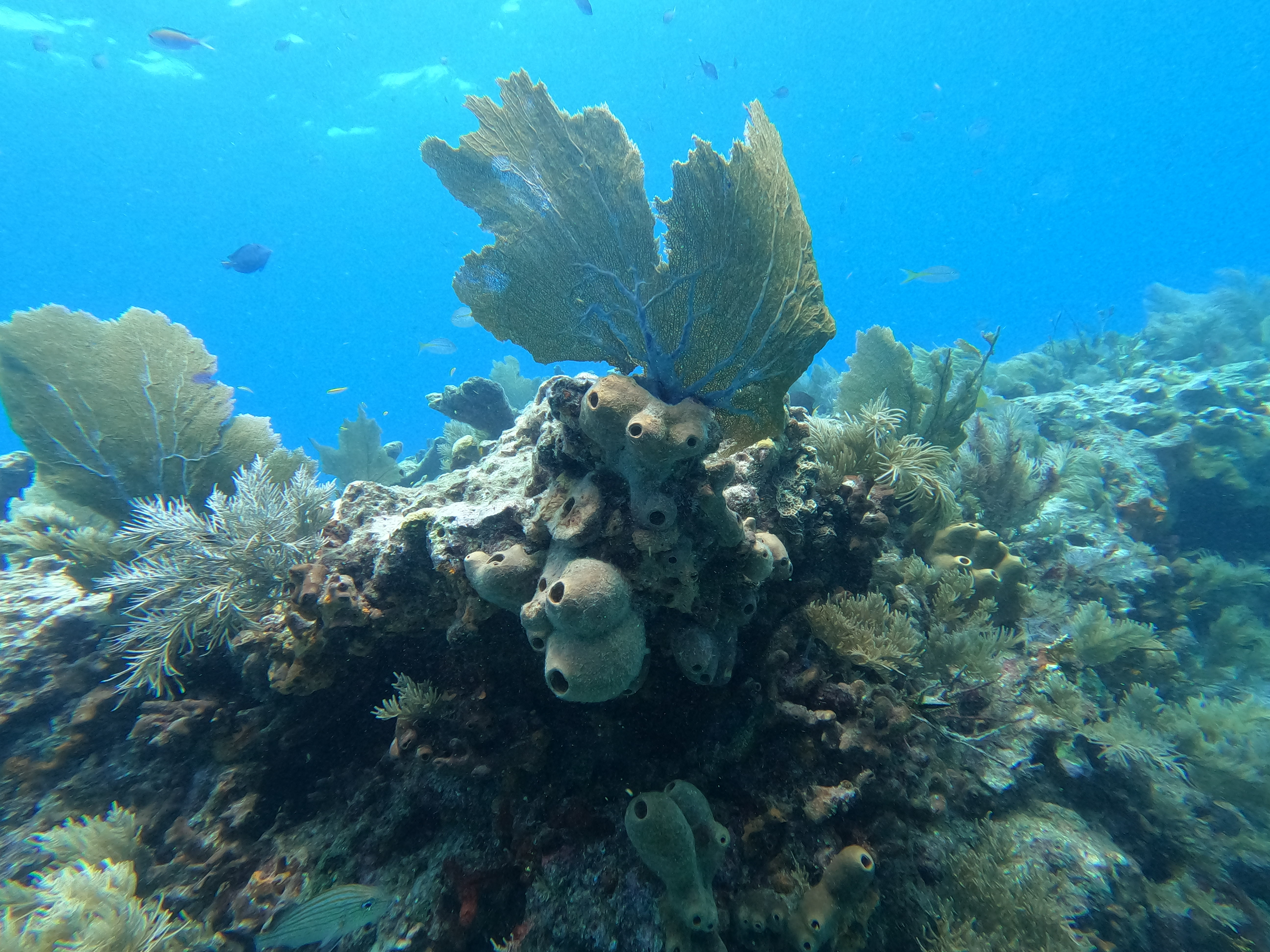
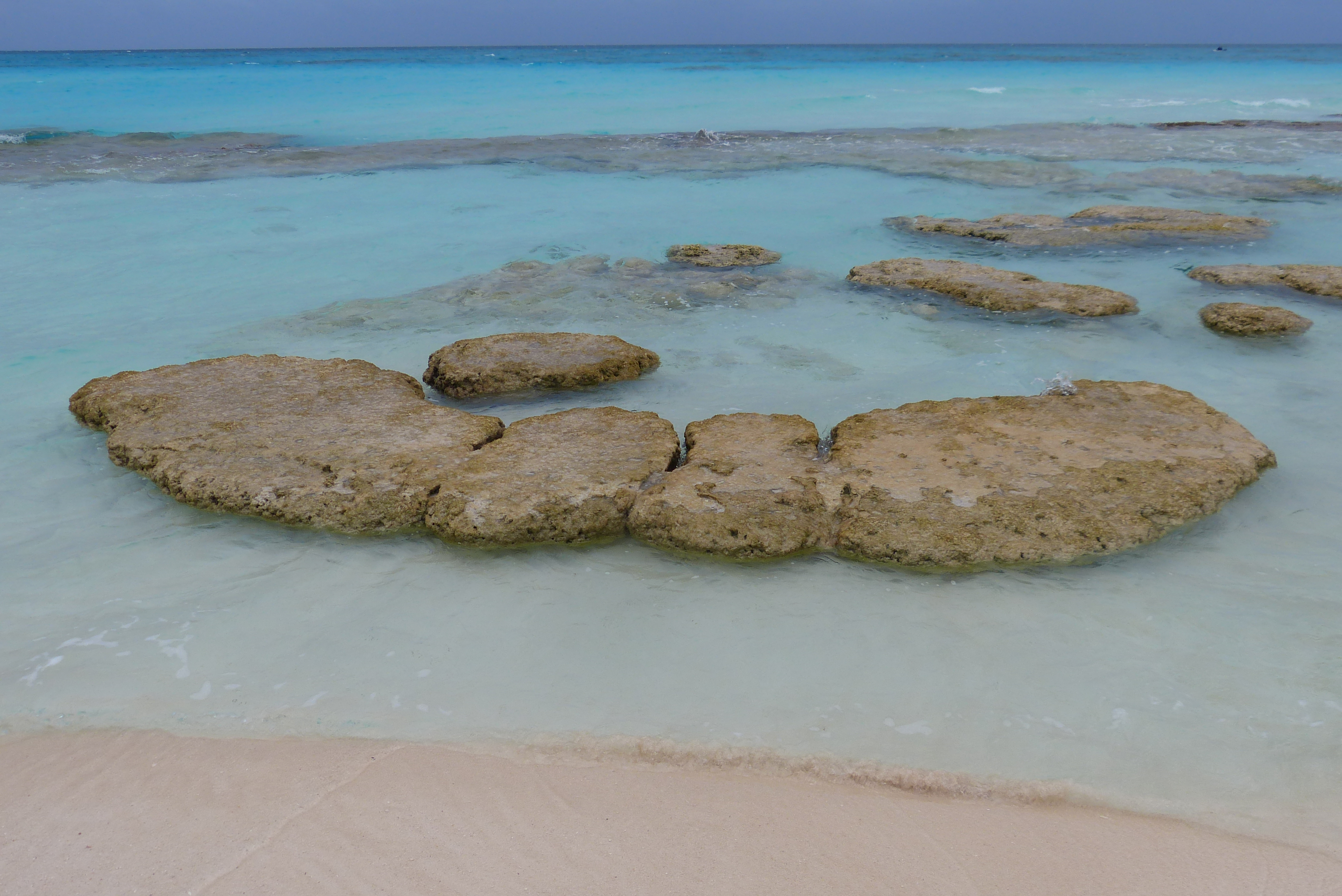
Coral-Sponge Patch reef (left) and microbialite (right) in the Bahamas. The Bou Dahar sediments record multiple environments within a carbonate platform: from patch reefal areas to shallow microbialites, like the modern Bahamas.

The paleoenvironment of Bou Dahar is characterized by a dynamic evolution through distinct stages: pre-drowning, drowning, and post-drowning, each marked by specific sedimentological and ecological changes that reflect shifts in energy conditions and depositional environments.

During the pre-drowning phase, the carbonate platform was dominated by tranquil lagoonal settings, indicative of low-energy environments. These conditions fostered the accumulation of microsparite carbonates, which are essential in maintaining the stable conditions found in lagoons. The presence of bioturbation, mud cracks, and tidal flats illustrates the periodic exposure of the substrate, suggesting a complex interplay of biogenic and abiogenic processes. The platform margin transitioned into coarser zones where higher-energy environments were characterized by sorted carbonate sands and natural barriers. This transitional buffer from the lagoon to slope facilitated the formation of intertidal mounds, which played a crucial role in the sediment dynamics of the region.

As the platform underwent drowning, it shifted towards high-energy conditions. Sediments from this phase exhibited dense biosparites with significant skeletal deposits, indicating heightened wave action and the erosion of previously accumulated lagoonal deposits. The transition to these high-energy environments underscores a significant change in the depositional dynamics, where sediment transport was dominated by stronger currents. The emergence of tepee structures in the platform carbonates reflects this period of increased energy. Formed from early lithification and sediment infill in intertidal zones, these structures were characterized by cracks filled with fine sediments and stromatolitic algae, highlighting rapid infilling processes shortly after deposition. Unlike their recent counterparts in the Persian Gulf, the Moroccan tepees developed in fully lithified rocks, shaped by thermal expansion and contraction driven by temperature variations in intertidal settings.

Microscopic examination of the sediments reveals a rich diversity of biogenic and non-biogenic components, categorized into nine distinct microfacies types. These include laminated pelmicrites, biopelsparites, and various intraclasts and bioclasts, showcasing the complex interplay of environmental factors influencing sediment composition. Foraminifers along with corals, indicate thriving marine ecosystems during the deposition of Bou Dahar. The various microfacies illustrate shifts in sedimentation dynamics, with microfacies types reflecting different depositional environments-from tranquil lagoonal settings to more energetic reef environments.

Local carbonate factories present a unique contrast with other coeval units in the Tethys, with siliceous sponge microbial boundstone mounds, which were more prevalent in Middle and Upper Jurassic systems. Despite their earlier emergence, these mounds show similarities to younger Jurassic formations in texture and biological components. They thrived in deep-water environments, particularly in areas that experienced low detrital input. Siliceous sponge mounds record distinct rare earth element and yttrium patterns among carbonate components, indicating that Early Jurassic seawater resembled modern distributions. Microbialites contained higher rare earth element concentrations, likely influenced by organic matter and diagenetic processes. These mounds thrived in well-oxygenated environments, emphasizing the need to examine individual carbonate types to understand their unique geochemical signatures. The coral calcareous sponge microbial boundstone aligns with the coral-microbolite-debris reef classification, indicating a high-energy, shallow-water habitat.

== Fossil content ==
Color key: Taxon / Reclassified taxon / Taxon falsely reported as present / Dubious taxon or junior synonym / Ichnotaxon / Ootaxon / Morphotaxon	Notes; Uncertain or tentative taxa are in small text; ~~crossed out~~ taxa are discredited.

=== Foraminifera ===
Genus	Species	Location	Material	Notes	Images
Agerina	A. martana	Bou Dahar	Isolated tests/shells	A foraminifer of the Cornuspiridae family	
Ammobaculites	A. coprolithiformis; A. spp.	Bou Dahar	Isolated tests/shells	A foraminifer of the family Ammomarginulininae.	
Bosniella	B. oenensis	Bou Dahar	Isolated tests/shells	A foraminifer of the Biokovinidae family	
Bullopora	B. spp.	Bou Dahar	Isolated tests/shells	A foraminifer of the Webbinellinae family	
Everticyclammina	E. praevirguliana	Bou Dahar	Isolated tests/shells	A foraminifer of the Everticyclamminidae family.	
Kurnubia	K. sp.	Bou Dahar	Isolated tests/shells	A foraminifer of the family Kurbuniinae	
Glomospira	G. sp.	Bou Dahar	Isolated tests/shells	A foraminifer of the family Ammodiscidae.	
Haurania	H. amiji; H. deserta; H. ssp.	Bou Dahar	Isolated tests/shells	A foraminifer of the family Hauraniinae.	
Involutina	I. farinacciae; I. liassica	Bou Dahar	Isolated tests/shells	A foraminifer of the Involutinidae family	
Lituosepta	L. recoarensis; L. compressa; L. ssp.	Bou Dahar	Isolated tests/shells	A foraminifer of the Mesoendothyridae family.	
Mesoendothyra	M. sp.	Bou Dahar	Isolated tests/shells	A foraminifer of the Mesoendothyridae family.	
Mayncina	M. termieri	Bou Dahar	Isolated tests/shells	A foraminifer of the Mayncinidae family	
Nodosaria	N. sexcostata; N. sp.	Bou Dahar	Isolated tests/shells	A foraminifer of the family Nodosariinae.	
Orbitopsella	O. primaeva; O. preacursor; O. dubari; O. spp.	Bou Dahar	Isolated tests/shells	A foraminifer of the Mesoendothyridae family.	
Ophtalmidium	O. concentricum; O. sp.	Bou Dahar	Isolated tests/shells	A foraminifer of the family Ophthalmidiidae.	
Pseudocyclammina	P. liasica; P. spp.	Bou Dahar	Isolated tests/shells	A foraminifer of the Pfenderinidae family.	
Planisepta	P. compressa	Bou Dahar	Isolated tests/shells	A foraminifer of the Planiseptinae family.	
Reophax	R. sp.	Bou Dahar	Isolated tests/shells	A foraminifer of the Reophacinae family	
Siphovalvulina	S. gibraltarensis; S. variabilis; S. sp.A	Bou Dahar	Isolated tests/shells	A foraminifer of the Pfenderinidae family.	
Tetrataxis	T. spp.	Bou Dahar	Isolated tests/shells	A foraminifer of the Tetrataxidae family.	
Textularopsis	T. sinemuriensis	Bou Dahar	Isolated tests/shells	A foraminifer of the family Nodosariinae.	
Trochammina	T. sp	Bou Dahar	Isolated tests/shells	A foraminifer of the Trochamminidae family	

=== Sponges ===
Genus	Species	Stratigraphic position	Material	Notes	Images
Arhoussia	A. calyx	Jebel Bou Arhous Srhir	Colonial imprints	A glass sponge, member of the family Euplectellidae	
Chaetetes	C. (Pseudoseptifer) zignoi; C. (Pseudoseptifer) murciana; C. (Pseudoseptifer) liasica	Bou Dahar	Colonial imprints	A demosponge, member of the family Chaetetinae. Monospecific assamblages with encrusting and symbiont forms	Specimen of the same genus
Palaeopora	P. ramulosa; P. liasica	Bou Dahar	Colonial imprints	A Calcareous sponge, incertae sedis affinities	
Stromatomorpha	S. californica; S. cf. californica; S. liassica; S. (Cylicopsis) atlantis	Bou Dahar; IttoFezzou; Ait-Ani	Colonial imprints	A demosponge, member of the family Anthaspidellidae	
Tillichtia	T. aedificator; T. spp.	Kadoussa	Colonial imprints	A glass sponge, member of the family Euplectellidae	

=== Hydrozoa ===
Genus	Species	Stratigraphic position	Material	Notes	Images
Spongiomorpha	S. ramosa; S. gibbosa; S. (Heptastylopsis) sp. 1	Bou Dahar	Colonial imprints	A hydrozoan, member of the family Spongiomorphidae	
Tubiphytes	T spp.	Bou Dahar	Colonial imprints	A hydrozoan, member of the family Nigriporellidae	Tubiphytes specimens

=== Anthozoa ===
Genus	Species	Stratigraphic position	Material	Notes	Images
Actinastrea	A. minima	Bou Dahar	Imprints and isolated specimens	A stony coral member of the family Actinastreidae	
Allocoeniopsis	A. dendroidea	Bou Dahar	Imprints and isolated specimens	A stony coral member of the family Actinastreidae	
Alloiteausmilia	A. boudaharensis	Bou Dahar	Imprints and isolated specimens	A stony coral member of the family Zardinophyllidae	
Araiophyllum	A. liasicum	Bou Dahar	Imprints and isolated specimens	A stony coral member of the family Comoseridae	
Archaeosmilia	A. menchikoffi; A. beata; A. sp.	Bou Dahar	Imprints and isolated specimens	A stony coral member of the family Archaeosmiliidae	
Brachyseris	B. walfordi	Bou Dahar	Imprints and isolated specimens	A stony coral member of the family Latomeandridae	
Chomatoseris	C. orbulites	Bou Dahar	Imprints and isolated specimens	A stony coral member of the family Comoseridae	
Cladophyllia	C. dresnayi	Bou Dahar	Imprints and isolated specimens	A stony coral member of the family Cladophylliidae	
Coenastraea	C. cf.maccoyi; C. sp.	Bou Dahar	Imprints and isolated specimens	A stony coral member of the family Actinastreidae	
Cyclophyllopsis	C. cornutiformis	Bou Dahar	Imprints and isolated specimens	A stony coral member of the family Cyclophyllopsiidae	
Dimorphastraea	D. menchikoffi	Bou Dahar	Imprints and isolated specimens	A stony coral member of the family Latomeandridae	
Eocomoseris	E. minima	Bou Dahar	Imprints and isolated specimens	A stony coral member of the family Comoseridae	
Epismilia	E. mauretaniensis; E.? sp.	Bou Dahar	Imprints and isolated specimens	A stony coral member of the family Zardinophyllidae	
Epismiliopsis	E. liasica; E. sp.	Bou Dahar	Imprints and isolated specimens	A stony coral member of the family Zardinophyllidae	
Epistreptophyllum	E. vetusum	Bou Dahar	Imprints and isolated specimens	A stony coral member of the family Dermosmiliidae	Epistreptophyllum specimen (from Germany)
Funginella	F. domeriensis	Bou Dahar	Imprints and isolated specimens	A stony coral member of the family Funginellidae	
Goniocora	G. concinna	Bou Dahar	Imprints and isolated specimens	A stony coral member of the family Stylinidae	Goniocora specimens
Haplaraea	H. spp.	Bou Dahar	Imprints and isolated specimens	A stony coral member of the family Astraraeidae	
Margarosmilia	M. gemminata	Bou Dahar	Imprints and isolated specimens	A stony coral member of the family Margarophylliidae	Margarosmilia specimens
Mesomorpha	M. gracilis; M. bussoni	Bou Dahar	Imprints and isolated specimens	A stony coral member of the family Thamnasteriidae	
Neorylstonia	N. pseudocolumellata; N. spp.	Bou Dahar	Imprints and isolated specimens	A stony coral member of the family Volzeioidea	
Omphalophylliopsis	O. lobatus	Bou Dahar	Imprints and isolated specimens	A stony coral member of the family Conophyllidae	
Plesiophyllum	P. cylindricum	Bou Dahar	Imprints and isolated specimens	A stony coral member of the family Zardinophyllidae	
Proleptophyllia	P. multiradiata; P. rejuvenescens; P. subcylindrica; P. bilobata	Bou Dahar	Imprints and isolated specimens	A stony coral member of the family Acrosmiliidae	
Rodinosmilia	R. elegantula	Bou Dahar	Imprints and isolated specimens	A stony coral member of the family Pachycoeniidae	
Stylosmilia	S. dresnayi	Bou Dahar	Imprints and isolated specimens	A stony coral member of the family Stylinidae	
Stylophyllopsis	S. vetusum; S. cf. rudis	Bou Dahar	Imprints and isolated specimens	A stony coral member of the family Stylophyllidae	
Trigerastrea	T. minima	Bou Dahar	Imprints and isolated specimens	A stony coral member of the family Latomeandridae	
Volzeia	V. badiotica	Bou Dahar	Imprints and isolated specimens	A stony coral member of the family Volzeiidae	

=== Brachiopoda ===
Genus	Species	Stratigraphic position	Material	Notes	Images
Aulacothyris	A. semiplana	Bou Dahar	Isolated shells	A terebratulidan, member of the family Zeilleriidae	
Dictyothyris	D. drepanensis	Bou Dahar	Isolated shells	A terebratulidan, member of the family Dictyothyrididae	
Fimbriothyris	F. itoensis; F. tenuiplicata; F. brevicostata	Bou Dahar	Isolated shells	A terebratulidan, member of the family Zeilleriidae	
Linguithyris	L. aspasia; L. adnethensis	Bou Dahar	Isolated shells	A terebratulidan, member of the family Nucleatidae	
Rhynchonella	R. quadrata; R. spp.	Bou Dahar	Isolated shells	A rhynchonellidan, member of the family Rhynchonellidae	
Prionorhynchia	P. msougari; P. subcynocephala; P. rubriaxensis	Bou Dahar	Isolated shells	A rhynchonellidan, member of the family Wellerellidae	
Prototegulithyris	P. khadijae	Bou Dahar	Isolated shells	A terebratulidan, member of the family Dictyothyrididae	
Pseudogibbirhynchia	P. jurensis; P. moorei; P. waehneri	Bou Dahar	Isolated shells	A rhynchonellidan, member of the family Basiliolidae	
Stolmorhynchia	S. limata	Bou Dahar	Isolated shells	A rhynchonellidan, member of the family Wellerellidae	
Suessia	S. liasina	Bou Dahar	Isolated shells	A terebratulidan, member of the family Zeilleriidae	

=== Gastropoda ===
Genus	Species	Stratigraphic position	Material	Notes	Images
Actaeonina	A. radius	Bou Dahar N7; Bou Dahar "Carriere"	Isolated shells	An architectibranchian, member of the family Acteonidae	
Amphitrochilia	A. (Aristerella) undata; A. (Aristerella) rorata	Bou Dahar N2; Bou Dahar N3; Bou Dahar N5; Bou Dahar N6; Bou Dahar N7; Bou Dahar N12; Bou Dahar "Carriere"	Isolated shells	A trochoidean, member of the family Proconulidae	
Ampullina	A. (Ampullospira) dominans; A. sp. nov; A. (Pseudamura) sp. nov	Bou Dahar N1; Bou Dahar N2; Bou Dahar N6; Bou Dahar N12; Bou Dahar "Carriere"	Isolated shells	A caenogastropodan, member of the family Ampullinidae	Ampullina specimens
Aphanoptyxis	A. cossmanni	Bou Dahar N7; Bou Dahar N9	Isolated shells	A nerineoidean, member of the family Ceritellidae	
Aptyxiella	A. praevia; A. fimbriata; A. subgradata	Bou Dahar N1; Bou Dahar N2; Bou Dahar N3; Bou Dahar N5; Bou Dahar N6; Bou Dahar N7; Bou Dahar N12; Bou Dahar "Carriere"	Isolated shells	A nerineoidean, incertae sedis	
Ataphrus	A. cf.piettei; A. (Pleuratella) cf.normaniensis	Bou Dahar N3; Bou Dahar N7; Bou Dahar "Carriere"; Tizi N´Oumzour	Isolated shells	A trochoidean, member of the family Ataphridae	
Boehmia	B. speciosa; B. costata	Bou Dahar N3; Bou Dahar N6	Isolated shells	A architectibranchian, member of the family Acteonidae	
Brachytrema	B. despujolsi	Bou Dahar N2; Bou Dahar N3; Bou Dahar N5; Bou Dahar N7; Bou Dahar N12	Isolated shells	A caenogastropodan, member of the family Brachytrematidae	
Buvignieria	B. sp.	Bou Dahar	Isolated shells	A littorinimorphan, member of the family Palaeorissoinidae	
Cerithiella	C. africana; C. sarrazini; C. aff.nudae	Bou Dahar N1; Bou Dahar N3; Bou Dahar N7; Bou Dahar N8; Bou Dahar "Carriere"	Isolated shells	A triphoroidean, member of the family Newtoniellidae	Cerithiella specimen
Cerithinella	C. termieri; C. cf.italica; C. gratiosa; C. miliare; C. gemmifera; C. margaritata; C. baccata; C. cf.baccata; C. aff.cerithiiformis; C. (Laevibaculus) sp.	Bou Dahar N1; Bou Dahar N2; Bou Dahar N3; Bou Dahar N5; Bou Dahar N6; Bou Dahar N7; Bou Dahar N11; Bou Dahar N12	Isolated shells	A caenogastropodan, member of the family Procerithiidae	
Climacina	C. daharensis; C. cf.mariae; C. sp.	Bou Dahar N2; Bou Dahar N3; Bou Dahar N7	Isolated shells	A caenogastropodan, member of the family Procerithiidae	
Coelostylina	C. chartroni; C. choffati; C. rigida; C. (Cosmostylina) darestei; C. (Cosmostylina) lima	Bou Dahar N2; Bou Dahar N3; Bou Dahar N4; Bou Dahar N6; Bou Dahar N7; Tizi N´Oumzour; Aguelmane-Azougar	Isolated shells	A caenogastropodan, member of the family Coelostylinidae	
Crossostoma	C. atlantis	Bou Dahar N7; Tizi N´Oumzour	Isolated shells	A trochoidean, member of the family Colloniidae	
Cryptaulax	C. angulodentatum; C. album; C. cf.contortum; C. cf.densestritum; C. aff.tetrataeniatum; C. cf.tetrataeniatum	Bou Dahar N2; Bou Dahar N3; Bou Dahar N4; Bou Dahar N6; Bou Dahar N7; Bou Dahar N11	Isolated shells	A cerithiimorphan, member of the family Cryptaulacinae	
Diarthema	D. sp.	Bou Dahar N3	Isolated shells	A littorinimorphan, member of the family Aporrhaidae	
Diatinostoma	D. sp.	Tizi N´Oumzour	Isolated shells	A caenogastropodan, member of the family Eustomatidae	
Dicroloma	D. sp.	Bou Dahar N7	Isolated shells	A littorinimorphan, member of the family Aporrhaidae	
Discocirrus	D. crispus; D. armatus	Bou Dahar N1; Bou Dahar N2; Bou Dahar N3; Bou Dahar N5; Bou Dahar N12; Bou Dahar "Carriere"	Isolated shells	A seguenziid, member of the family Cirridae	
Discohelix	D. (Colpomphalus) spledens; D. (Colpomphalus) cf.glauca; D. (Colpomphalus) sp. A	Bou Dahar N3; Bou Dahar N6; Bou Dahar N7; Bou Dahar N12; Bou Dahar "Carriere"	Isolated shells	A seguenziid, member of the family Eucyclidae	Discohelix specimen
Exelissa	E. pusilla; E. douxamii; E. spissa; E. galenae; E. menchikoffi; E. cf.prealpina	Bou Dahar N1; Bou Dahar N2; Bou Dahar N3; Bou Dahar N4; Bou Dahar N6; Bou Dahar N7; Bou Dahar N8; Bou Dahar N9; Bou Dahar N12; Ait Daoud-ou-Azzi	Isolated shells	A cerithiimorphan, member of the family Cryptaulacinae	
Emarginula	E. henrici; E. cf.orthogonia; E. (Rimula) pileata; E. (Rimula) sp. A; E. (Rimula) sp. B	Bou Dahar N3; Bou Dahar N7; Bou Dahar N12; Bou Dahar "Carriere"; Aït Daoud	Isolated shells	A lepetellidan, member of the family Fissurellidae	Emarginula specimens
Eucyclus	E. lateclathratus	Bou Dahar N3	Isolated shells	A seguenziid, member of the family Eucyclidae	
Fibulella	F. afra; F. nicolai; F. sp.	Bou Dahar, all the levels	Isolated shells	A nerineoidean, member of the family Ceritellidae	
Gymnocerithium	G. sp.	Bou Dahar "Carriere"	Isolated shells	A caenogastropodan, member of the family Campanilidae	
Hesperidina	H. striolata	Bou Dahar N7; Tizi N´Oumzour; Imi n´Ikis	Isolated shells	A caenogastropodan, member of the family Purpurinidae	
Nerinella	N. marucchiensis; N. cayeuxi; N. cf.atava; N. convoluta; N. sp.	Bou Dahar N1; Bou Dahar N2; Bou Dahar N3; Bou Dahar N6; Bou Dahar N7; Bou Dahar N8; Bou Dahar N11; Bou Dahar N12; Bou Dahar "Carriere"	Isolated shells	A nerineoidean, member of the family Nerinellidae	
Neritodomus	N. calaminae; N. (Sphaerochilus) daharensis; N. cf.tethys	Bou Dahar N1; Bou Dahar N2; Bou Dahar N3; Bou Dahar N7; Bou Dahar "Carriere"; Bou Dahar Plateau; Tizi N´Oumzour	Isolated shells	A cycloneritidan, member of the family Neridomidae	
Neritopsis	N. falloti; N. sp.	Bou Dahar N2; Bou Dahar "Carriere"	Isolated shells	A cycloneritidan, member of the family Neritopsidae	Neritopsis specimens
Ovacteonina	O. sp.	Bou Dahar N7	Isolated shells	An architectibranchian, member of the family Acteonidae	
Paracerithium	P. lacostei; P. echinatum; P. liasinum; P. merciaii; P. ingens; P. angulosum; P. cf.strueveri; P. cf.multiforme	Bou Dahar N1; Bou Dahar N2; Bou Dahar N3; Bou Dahar N6; Bou Dahar N7; Bou Dahar N11; Bou Dahar N12; Bou Dahar "Carriere"	Isolated shells	A caenogastropodan, member of the family Batillariidae	
Pileolus	P. laevis	Bou Dahar, all the levels; Tizi N´Oumzour	Isolated shells	A cycloneritidan, member of the family Pileolidae	
Platyacra	P. (Asperilla) russoi	Bou Dahar N1; Bou Dahar N2; Bou Dahar N12; Amellago	Isolated shells	A trochoidean, member of the family Angariidae	
Pleurotomaria	P. cf.pisana	Bou Dahar	Isolated shells	A pleurotomariidan, member of the family Pleurotomariidae	Pleurotomaria specimens
Procerithium	P. canescens; P. curtum; P. sp.	Bou Dahar N2; Bou Dahar N3; Bou Dahar N7; Bou Dahar N12	Isolated shells	A caenogastropodan, member of the family Procerithiidae	
Proconulus	P. spinatus; P. sp. A; P. sp. B	Bou Dahar N3; Bou Dahar N6; Bou Dahar N7; Bou Dahar N12; Bou Dahar "Carriere"	Isolated shells	A trochoidean, member of the family Proconulidae	
Protorcula	P. fischeri	Bou Dahar N2; Bou Dahar N7; Bou Dahar N8	Isolated shells	A pseudozygopleuroidean, member of the family Protorculidae	
Pseudomelania	P. aristomacha; P. dealbata; P. chrysallis; P. (Gardetia) chouberti; P. (Oonia) marucchiensis; P. (Oonia) cf.turgidula; P. (Oonia) aff.pupoideae; P. (Oonia) sp.; P. (Rhabdoconcha) tenuestriata; P. cf.procera; P. cf.eulimoides; P. cf.rhea; P. cf.globosa; P. sp.	Bou Dahar N1; Bou Dahar N2; Bou Dahar N3; Bou Dahar N6; Bou Dahar N7; Bou Dahar N8; Bou Dahar N12; Bou Dahar "Carriere"; Tizi N´Oumzour	Isolated shells	A caenogastropodan, member of the family Pseudomelaniidae	Pseudomelania specimen
Pseudonerinea	P. terebra; P. liasica; P. sp. A; P. sp.	Bou Dahar N1; Bou Dahar N2; Bou Dahar N3; Bou Dahar N5; Bou Dahar N6; Bou Dahar "Carriere"	Isolated shells	A nerineoidean, member of the family Pseudonerineidae	
Purpurina	P. rudis; P. moghrabiensis; P. patroclus; P. berberica	Bou Dahar N1; Bou Dahar N2; Bou Dahar N3; Bou Dahar N4; Bou Dahar N6; Bou Dahar N7; Bou Dahar N12; Bou Dahar "Carriere"; Kasba d´Amellago; Tizi N´Oumzour	Isolated shells	A caenogastropodan, member of the family Purpurinidae	Example of Purpurina specimen
Rigauxia	R. baculus	Bou Dahar N2; Bou Dahar N7; Bou Dahar "Carriere"	Isolated shells	A streptacidoidean, incertae sedis	
Scurriopsis	S. altissima; S. parma; S. (Scurria?) cf.nana; S. (Scurria?) sp.	Bou Dahar N3; Bou Dahar N7; Bou Dahar N12; Bou Dahar "Carriere"; Aït Daoud; El-Kansera	Isolated shells	A lottioidean, member of the family Acmaeidae	Scurria specimens
Teliochilus	T. cf.deslongchampsi; T. clathratus	Bou Dahar N2; Bou Dahar N3; Bou Dahar N4; Bou Dahar N6; Bou Dahar N7; Bou Dahar N12	Isolated shells	A cerithiimorphan, member of the family Cryptaulacinae	
Tectus	T. (Dimorphotectus) chouberti	Bou Dahar N3; Bou Dahar N7; Bou Dahar "Carriere"	Isolated shells	A trochoidean, member of the family Tegulidae	Tectus specimens
Teinostoma	T. sp.	Bou Dahar N2; Bou Dahar "Carriere"	Isolated shells	A littorinimorphan, member of the family Teinostomatidae	Teinostoma specimens
Trochotoma	T. (Ditremaria) secans; T. (Ditremaria) pachyspira	Bou Dahar N3; Bou Dahar N7; Bou Dahar N12; Bou Dahar "Carriere"	Isolated shells	A pleurotomariidan, member of the family Trochotomidae	
Tylostoma	T. maurum	Bou Dahar N7; Bou Dahar "Carriere"	Isolated shells	A caenogastropodan, member of the family Tylostomatidae	Tylostoma specimen
Zygopleura	Z. pectita; Z. appenninica; Z. paradisi; Z. tatia; Z. menchikoffi; Z. sp.	Bou Dahar N1; Bou Dahar N2; Bou Dahar N3; Bou Dahar N4; Bou Dahar N6; Bou Dahar N7; Bou Dahar N12; Bou Dahar "Carriere"	Isolated shells	A pseudozygopleuroidean, member of the family Zygopleuridae	Example of Zygopleura specimen

=== Polyplacophora ===
Genus	Species	Stratigraphic position	Material	Notes	Images
Allochiton	A. sp. nov?	Bou Dahar	Isolated shells	A chiton, member of the family Mopaliidae	Example of modern Mopalia, relative of the same family
Heterochiton	H. cf.giganteus; H. cf.zitteli; H. sp. nov?	Bou Dahar	Isolated shells	A chiton, member of the family Mopaliidae	Example of modern Mopalia, relative of the same family

=== Bivalvia ===
Genus	Species	Stratigraphic position	Material	Notes	Images
Anisocardia	A. quadrata	Bou Dahar N4	Isolated shells	An veneridan, member of the family Arcticidae	
Astarte	A. vendaeensis; A. marcaisi; A. (Theveninia) aff. tetragona; A. aff.interlineata; A. sp.	Bou Dahar N3; Bou Dahar N5; Bou Dahar N6; Bou Dahar N12; Bou Dahar Sup	Isolated shells	A carditidan, member of the family Astartidae	Astarte specimens
Barbatia	B. metellaria	Bou Dahar N3; Bou Dahar N4; Bou Dahar N5; Bou Dahar N7	Isolated shells	An arcidan, member of the family Arcidae	Barbatia specimens
Cardium	C. pustulatum; C. galenae; C. (Protocardia) praecalva; C. sp.	Bou Dahar N2; Bou Dahar N3; Bou Dahar N7; Tizi N´Oumzour	Isolated shells	A pectinidan, member of the family Pectinidae	Cardium specimens
Camptonectes	C. sp.	Bou Dahar "Carriere"	Isolated shells	A cardiidan, member of the family Cardiidae	
Chlamys	C. aff.uhligi	Bou Dahar Sup	Isolated shells	A pectinidan, member of the family Pectinidae	
Cochlearites	C. loppianus	Bou Dahar "Carriere"; SE Azou; N Aït Oufella; Foum Kheneg; Tizi N´Oumzour	Isolated shells	An ostreidan, member of the family Plicatostylidae	Cochlearites
Fimbria	F. (Corbis) alveolus; F. (Corbis) cochlearis; F. (Corbis) trulla; F. (Corbis) sp.	Bou Dahar N1; Bou Dahar N3; Bou Dahar N4; Bou Dahar N12; Bou Dahar "Carriere"	Isolated shells	A lucinidan, member of the family Lucinidae.	Fimbria specimens (from Hawaii)
Gervillia	G. (Gervilleia) spinicosta; G. (Gervilleia) sp.	Bou Dahar "Carriere"; Toutia; Foum Kheneg	Isolated shells	An ostreidan, member of the family Bakevelliidae	
Gervilleioperna	G. atlantis; G. buchi; G. termieri; G. timorensis; G. sp.	Bou Dahar "Carriere"; SE Azou; N Aït Oufella; Foum Kheneg; Tizi N´Oumzour	Isolated shells	An ostreidan, member of the family Plicatostylidae	Gervillioperna
Lima	L. (Plagiostoma) eucharis; Lima (Limea) aff.juliana; L. (Ctenostreon) cf.raricostata; L. (Ctenostreon) sp.	Bou Dahar N3; Bou Dahar "Carriere"	Isolated shells	A limidan, member of the family Limidae	Lima specimens
Lithioperna	L. (Lithiopedalion) kuehni; L. scutata; L. spp.	Bou Dahar "Carriere"; SE Azou; N Aït Oufella; Foum Kheneg; Tizi N´Oumzour	Isolated shells	An ostreidan, member of the family Plicatostylidae	Lithioperna
Lucina	L. (Phacoides) lunulicava; L. (Phacoides) laevis; L. (Phacoides) cf.zonaria; L. (Phacoides) sp. nov	Bou Dahar N2; Bou Dahar N4; Bou Dahar N7; Bou Dahar "Carriere"; Aguelmane-Azougar	Isolated shells	A lucinidan, member of the family Lucinidae.	Lucina specimens
Isoarca	I. ssp.	Bou Dahar	Isolated shells	A nuculanidan, member of the family Isoarcidae	
Isocyprina	I. pulla	Bou Dahar N3; Bou Dahar N7; Bou Dahar "Carriere"	Isolated shells	A veneridan, member of the family Isocyprinidae	
Myoconcha	M. linguaeformis; M. (Daharina) gentili; M. aff.corniculun	Bou Dahar N3; Bou Dahar N7; Bou Dahar "Carriere"	Isolated shells	An imparidentian, member of the family Kalenteridae	
Mytilus	M. maurus; M. aff.furcatus; M. (Pachymytilus) superbus	Bou Dahar N6; Bou Dahar N7; Bou Dahar N12; Bou Dahar "Carriere"	Isolated shells	A mytilidan, member of the family Mytilidae	Mytilus specimens
Opis	O. alata; O. caudata; O. bicristata	Bou Dahar; Aguelmane-Azougar	Isolated shells	A carditidan, member of the family Astartidae.	
Opisoma	O. excavatum; O. menchikoffi; O. curvidens; O. scalprum; O. rex; O. bourcarti; O. spp.	Bou Dahar N2; Bou Dahar N3; Bou Dahar N6; Bou Dahar N7; Bou Dahar N8; Bou Dahar N12; Bou Dahar "Carriere"; Khorchef	Isolated shells	A carditidan, member of the family Astartidae. Is considered a genus that evolved from shallow burrowing ancestors, becoming a secondarily semi-infaunal edgewise recliner adapted to photosymbiosis.	
Pachyerisma	P. opimum	Bou Dahar N3; Bou Dahar N4; Bou Dahar N7	Isolated shells	A megalodontidan, member of the family Megalodontidae	
Pachymegalodon	P. timorense	Bou Dahar "Carriere"	Isolated shells	A megalodontidan, member of the family Megalodontidae	
Parallelodon	P. (Beushausenia) daharensis; P. (Beushausenia) sp.	Bou Dahar N1; Bou Dahar N3; Bou Dahar N4; Bou Dahar "Carriere"	Isolated shells	An arcidan, member of the family Parallelodontidae	
Perna	P. scutata; P. sp. nov; P. sp.	Bou Dahar N6; Bou Dahar N7; Bou Dahar N12; Bou Dahar "Carriere"	Isolated shells	An ostreidan, member of the family Pteriidae	Perna specimens
Pecten	P. (Aequipecten) julianus; P. (Aequipecten) norigliensis; P. aff.bersaskensis; P. spp.	Bou Dahar N1; Bou Dahar N3; Bou Dahar N12; Bou Dahar "Carriere"; Foum Kheneg	Isolated shells	A pectinidan, member of the family Pectinidae	Pecten specimens
Plicatula	P. daharensis	Bou Dahar N3; Bou Dahar N6; Bou Dahar N7; Bou Dahar "Carriere"	Isolated shells	A pectinidan, member of the family Plicatulidae	Plicatula specimens
Pinna	P. (Pinnigena) sp.	Bou Dahar	Isolated shells	An ostreidan, member of the family Pinnidae	Pinna specimens
Pseudotrapezium	P. spp.	Bou Dahar N7	Isolated shells	A veneridan, member of the family Trapezidae	
Spondylus	S. numidus	Bou Dahar Sup	Isolated shells	A pectinidan, member of the family Spondylidae	Spondylus specimens

=== Ammonites ===
Genus	Species	Stratigraphic position	Material	Notes	Images
Apoderoceras	A. davoei; A. sp.	Bou Dahar N1	Isolated shells	An ammonite, member of the family Coeloceratidae	Apoderoceras specimen
Arieticeras	A. algovianum; A. bertrandi	Jebel Bou Rharraf	Isolated shells	An ammonite, member of the family Hildoceratidae	
Calaiceras	C. calais	Jebel Bou Rharraf	Isolated shells	An ammonite, member of the family Phylloceratidae	
Dactylioceras	D. tenuicostatum	Bou Dahar N1	Isolated shells	An ammonite, member of the family Dactylioceratidae	Dactylioceras reconstruction
Dubariceras	D. dubari; D. spp.	Jebel Bou Rharraf	Isolated shells	An ammonite, member of the family Eoderoceratidae	
Emaciaticeras	E. archimedis; E. emaciatum; E. fervidum	Jebel Bou Rharraf	Isolated shells	An ammonite, member of the family Hildoceratidae	
Fuciniceras	F. (Paltarpites) aequiondulatum; F. balatonense; F. bonarellii; F. costicillatum; F. cornacaldense; F. dilectum; F. isseli; F. lavinianum; F. mellahense; F. volubile; F. wiedenmayeri; F. sp.	Jebel Bou Rharraf; Bou Dahar	Isolated shells	An ammonite, member of the family Hildoceratidae	
Galaticeras	G. aegoceroides; G. subtriangulare; G. harpoceratoides; G. aff. harpoceratoides; G. spp.	Jebel Bou Rharraf; Bou Dahar	Isolated shells	An ammonite, member of the family Lytoceratidae	
Hildoceratoides	H. pectinatum	Bou Dahar N7	Isolated shells	An ammonite, member of the family Hildoceratidae	
Juraphyllites	J. libertus; J. limatus; J. (Harpophylloceras) eximius; J. sp.	Jebel Bou Rharraf; Bou Dahar	Isolated shells	An ammonite, member of the family Juraphyllitidae	
Leptaleoceras	L. accuratum; L. insigne	Jebel Bou Rharraf	Isolated shells	An ammonite, member of the family Hildoceratidae	
Liparoceras	L. (Becheiceras) bechei	Jebel Bou Rharraf	Isolated shells	An ammonite, member of the family Liparoceratidae	Liparoceras specimen
Lytoceras	L. baconicum; L. fimbriatum; L. fimbriatoides; L. furcicrenatum; L. ovimontanum; L. villae; L. spp.	Jebel Bou Rharraf; Bou Dahar	Isolated shells	An ammonite, member of the family Lytoceratidae	Lytoceras fimbriatum specimen
Mauretaniaceras	M. elmii	Jebel Bou Rharraf	Isolated shells	An ammonite, member of the family Hildoceratidae	
Metaderoceras	M. apertum; M. brutum; M. gemmellaroi; M. cf.gemmellaroi; M. pseudomuticum; M. spp.	Jebel Bou Rharraf	Isolated shells	An ammonite, member of the family Eoderoceratidae	
Microderoceras	M.(Eoderoceras) birchiades	Jebel Bou Rharraf	Isolated shells	An ammonite, member of the family Eoderoceratidae	Microderoceras specimen
Miltoceras	M. bettonii; M. involutum; M. roseum; M. sellae; M. taguendoufi; M. spp.	Jebel Bou Rharraf; Bou Dahar	Isolated shells	An ammonite, member of the family Coeloceratidae	
Paltechioceras	P. boehmi	Bou Dahar	Isolated shells	An ammonite, member of the family Echioceratidae	
Partschiceras	P. sp.	Jebel Bou Rharraf	Isolated shells	An ammonite, member of the family Phylloceratidae	
Phricodoceras	P. bettonii; P. cantaluppii	Jebel Bou Rharraf	Isolated shells	An ammonite, member of the family Phricodoceratidae	
Phylloceras	P. hebertinum	Jebel Bou Rharraf; Bou Dahar	Isolated shells	An ammonite, member of the family Phylloceratidae	Phylloceras reconstruction
Prodactylioceras	P. colubriforme; P. italicum	Jebel Bou Rharraf; Bou Dahar	Isolated shells	An ammonite, member of the family Dactylioceratidae	Prodactylioceras specimen
Reynesoceras	R. mortilleti; R. ragazzoni	Jebel Bou Rharraf; Bou Dahar	Isolated shells	An ammonite, member of the family Dactylioceratidae	
Reynesocoeloceras	R. fallax; R. indunense; R. praeincertum; R. simulans	Jebel Bou Rharraf; Bou Dahar	Isolated shells	An ammonite, member of the family Dactylioceratidae	
Radstockiceras	R. spp.	Jebel Bou Rharraf	Isolated shells	An ammonite, member of the family Oxynoticeratidae	
Tauromeniceras	T. mazetieri; T. nerinea; T. spp.	Jebel Bou Rharraf; Bou Dahar	Isolated shells	An ammonite, member of the family Hildoceratidae	
Tropidoceras	T. demonense; T. flandrini; T. heterogeneum; T. zitteli	Jebel Bou Rharraf; Bou Dahar N4	Isolated shells	An ammonite, member of the family Polymorphitidae	
Zetoceras	Z. zetes; Z. ssp.	Jebel Bou Rharraf	Isolated shells	An ammonite, member of the family Phylloceratidae	

=== Annelida ===
Genus	Species	Stratigraphic position	Material	Notes	Images
Serpula	S. spp.	Bou Dahar	Tubiform structures	A serpulid, member of the family Serpulidae	Serpula specimen
Terebella	T. lapilloides; T. spp.	Bou Dahar	Tubiform structures	A terebellid, member of the family Terebellidae	Terebella specimen

=== Echinodermata ===
Genus	Species	Stratigraphic position	Material	Notes	Images
Apiocrinus	A. amalthei	Bou Dahar	Stems	A crinoid, member of the family Apiocrinidae	
Atlasaster	A. termieri	Bou Dahar	Specimens	An echinoid, member of the group Irregularia	
Diademopsis	D. behtensis	Bou Dahar	Specimens and isolated spines	An echinoid, member of the family Pedinidae	Diademopsis specimen
Diplechinus	D. hebbriensis	Bou Dahar	Specimens and isolated spines	An echinoid, member of the family Stomechinidae	
Diplocidaris	D. menchikoffi	Bou Dahar	Specimens and isolated spines	An echinoid, member of the family Diplocidaridae	Diplocidaris specimen
Firmacidaris	F. precincta	Bou Dahar	Specimens and isolated spines	An echinoid, incertae sedis	
Hemicidaris	H. termieri	Bou Dahar	Specimens and isolated spines	An echinoid, member of the family Hemicidaridae	Hemicidaris specimen
Microdiadema	M. richeri	Bou Dahar	Specimens and isolated spines	An echinoidea, member of the family Pseudodiadematidae	
Miocidaris	M. dubari	Bou Dahar	Specimens and isolated spines	An echinoid, member of the family Miocidaridae	
Pseudopedina	P. atlantis	Bou Dahar	Specimens and isolated spines	An echinoid, member of the family Pedinidae	
Pygaster	P. daguini	Bou Dahar	Specimens and isolated spines	An echinoid, member of the family Pygasteridae	
Reboulicidaris	R. rebouli	Bou Dahar	Specimens and isolated spines	An echinoid, member of Roseicidaroida	
Smithicidaris	S. jacquemeti	Bou Dahar	Specimens and isolated spines	An echinoid, member of the family Diplocidaridae	

=== Microproblematic/algae ===
Genus	Species	Location	Material	Notes	Images
Aeolissacus	A. spp.	Bou Dahar	Calcified thalli	A possible green algae of the family Dasycladaceae.	
Apophoretella	A. spp.	Bou Dahar	Calcified specimens	A cyanobacterial alga of the family Cyanophyceae	
Baccanella	B. floriformis	Bou Dahar	Calcified specimens	incertae sedis	
Bacinella	B. irregularis; B. ordinata	Bou Dahar	Calcified specimens	A cyanobacterial alga of the family Garwoodiaceae	
Boueina	B. hochstetteri	Bou Dahar; IttoFezzou; Ait-Ani	Calcified specimens	A green algae of the family Halimedaceae.	
Cayeuxia	C. liasica; C. spp.	Bou Dahar	Calcified thalli	A green algae of the Halimedaceae or Udoteaceae family.	Modern Udotea
Lithocodium	L. aggregatum	Bou Dahar	Calcified specimens	incertae sedis	
Muranella	M. sphaerica	Bou Dahar	Calcified specimens	incertae sedis	
Neomizzia	N. elongata	Bou Dahar	Calcified specimens	A green algae of the family Dasycladaceae.	Considered to be convergent with modern Cymopolia
Palaeodasycladus	P. fragilis; P. mediterraneus; P. dolomiticus; P. anae; P. spp.	Bou Dahar	Calcified thalli	A green algae of the family Dasycladaceae. A reefal algae usually found in carbonate settings along all the Mediterranean	
Radiomura	R. cautica	Bou Dahar	Calcified specimens	incertae sedis	
Rivularia	R. moesica	Bou Dahar	Calcified specimens	A cyanobacterial alga of the family Rivulariaceae	Rivularia specimens
Solenopora	S. liasica	Bou Dahar	Calcified specimens	A red alga of the family Solenoporaceae	
Tersella	T. genotii; T. alpina	Bou Dahar	Calcified specimens	A green algae of the family Dasycladaceae.	
Thaumatoporella	T. parvovesiculifera	Bou Dahar	Calcified thalli	A green alga of the Thaumatoporellales group	
Toulaina	T. liassica	Bou Dahar; IttoFezzou; Ait-Ani	Calcified specimens	A green algae of the family Halimedaceae.	

== See also ==
- Rotzo Formation, Italy
- Marne di Monte Serrone, Italy
- Calcare di Sogno, Italy
- Aganane Formation, Morocco
- Tafraout Group, Morocco
- Azilal Formation, Morocco
- Budoš Limestone, Montenegro
- Cañadón Asfalto Formation, Argentina
- Los Molles Formation, Argentina
- Mawson Formation, Antarctica
- Kandreho Formation, Madagascar
- Kota Formation, India
- Cattamarra Coal Measures, Australia
