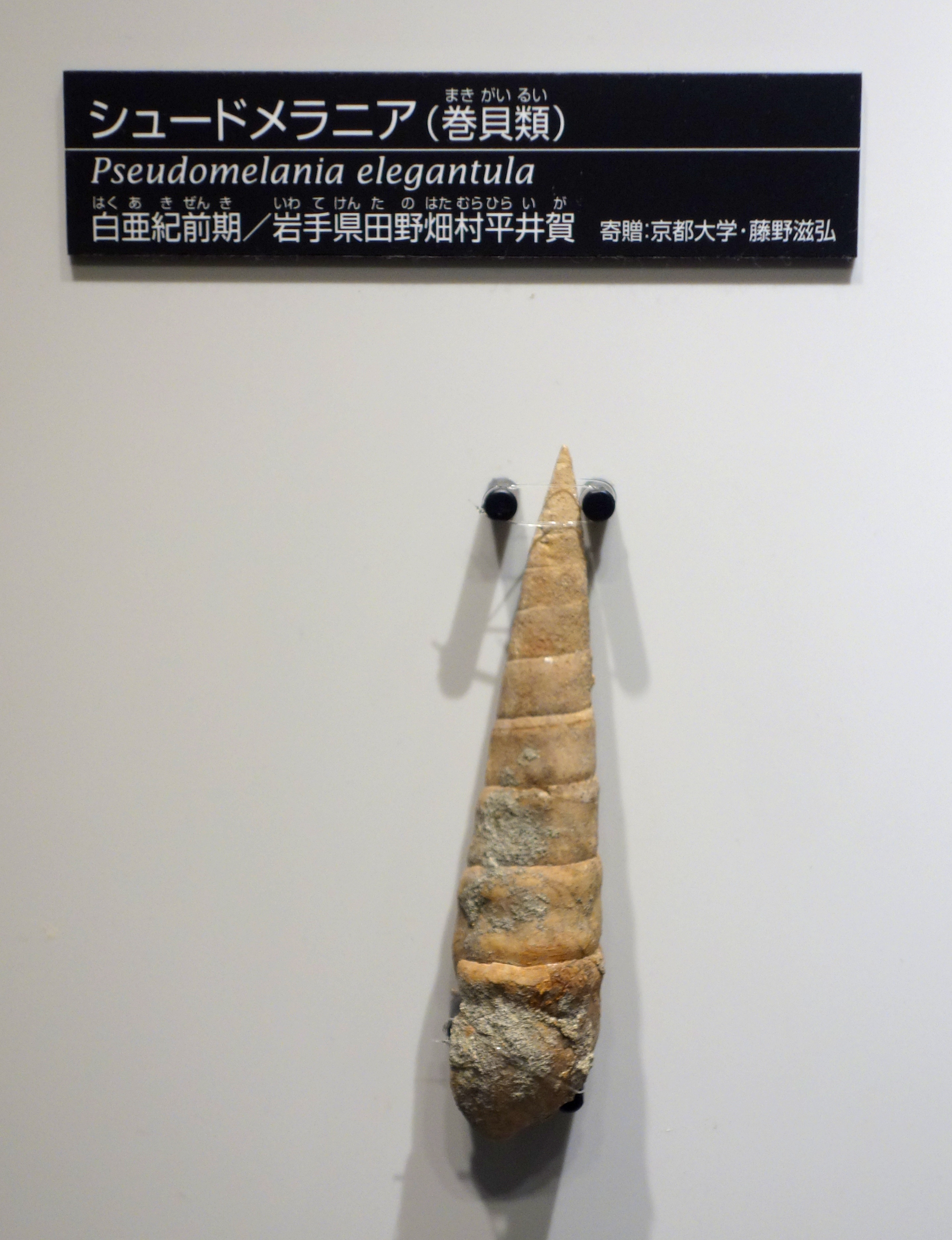
- Pseudomelania elegantula

Scientific classification
- Kingdom: Animalia
- Phylum: Mollusca
- Class: Gastropoda
- Subclass: Caenogastropoda
- Superfamily: †Pseudomelanioidea; R. Hoernes, 1884

= Pseudomelanioidea =

Extinct superfamily of gastropods

Pseudomelanioidea is an extinct superfamily of fossil sea snails, marine gastropod molluscs in the clade Caenogastropoda named after the family Pseudomelaniidae.

== Taxonomy ==
- † Family Pseudomelaniidae R. Hoernes, 1884
- † Family Trajanellidae Pchelintsev, 1951
