= Lycett =

Lycett is a surname. Notable people with the surname include:

- Andrew Lycett (born 1948), English biographer and journalist
- Eustace Lycett (1914–2006), British special effects artist
- Francis Lycett (1803–1880), British businessman and philanthropist
- Gwendoline Lycett (1880–1954), British figure skater
- Joan Lycett (1903–1998), British tennis player
- Joe Lycett (born 1988), English comedian
- John Lycett (1804–1882), British paleontologist
- Joseph Lycett (1774–1828), Australian portrait and miniature painter
- Randolph Lycett (1886–1935), English tennis player
- Scott Lycett (born 1992), Australian rules footballer

== See also ==
- Candida Lycett Green (1942–2014), British author
- Rupert Lycett Green (born 1938), British fashion designer
- Taiwo Ajai-Lycett (born 1941), Nigerian poet and actress
