= Zygopleurinae =

Scientific classification
- Kingdom: Animalia
- Phylum: Mollusca
- Class: Gastropoda
- Subclass: Caenogastropoda
- Family: †Zygopleuridae
- Subfamily: †Zygopleurinae; Wenz, 1938

Synonyms
- †Anoptychiidae Bandel, 1994

Extinct subfamily of gastropods

Zygopleurinae is an extinct subfamily of sea snails, marine gastropod mollusks in the informal group Lower Heterobranchia.
