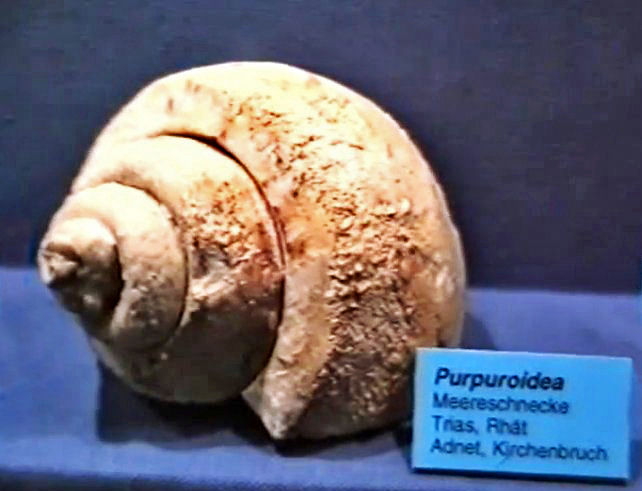
- Fossil of Purpuroidea species

Scientific classification
- Kingdom: Animalia
- Phylum: Mollusca
- Class: Gastropoda
- Subclass: Caenogastropoda
- Order: Neogastropoda
- Family: †Purpurinidae
- Genus: †Purpuroidea; Lycett, 1848

= Purpuroidea =

Purpuroidea Temporal range: Ladinian–Turonian

Extinct genus of gastropods

Purpuroidea is an extinct genus of sea snails, marine gastropod molluscs in the clade Littorinimorpha.

== Fossil record ==
These extinct sea snails lived between the Middle Triassic, Ladinian age (about 242 - 237 million years ago) and the Early Cretaceous, Turonian age (about 122 – 112 million years ago). The fossils were found in Japan, Portugal, Ethiopia, France, Israel, Italy, Jordan, Kenya, Mexico, Romania, Saudi Arabia, Tanzania, Tunisia, Austria, Hungary, Iran and United States.

== Species ==
Species within this genus include:

- † Purpuroidea acatlana Alencaster and Buitron 1965
- † Purpuroidea applanata Kittl 1894
- † Purpuroidea cerithiformis Kittl 1894
- † Purpuroidea crassenodosa Kittl 1894
- † Purpuroidea praecursor Fischer et al. 2002
- † Purpuroidea rugosa Böhm 1895
- † Purpuroidea subcerithiformis Kittl 1894

== See also ==
- List of marine gastropod genera in the fossil record
