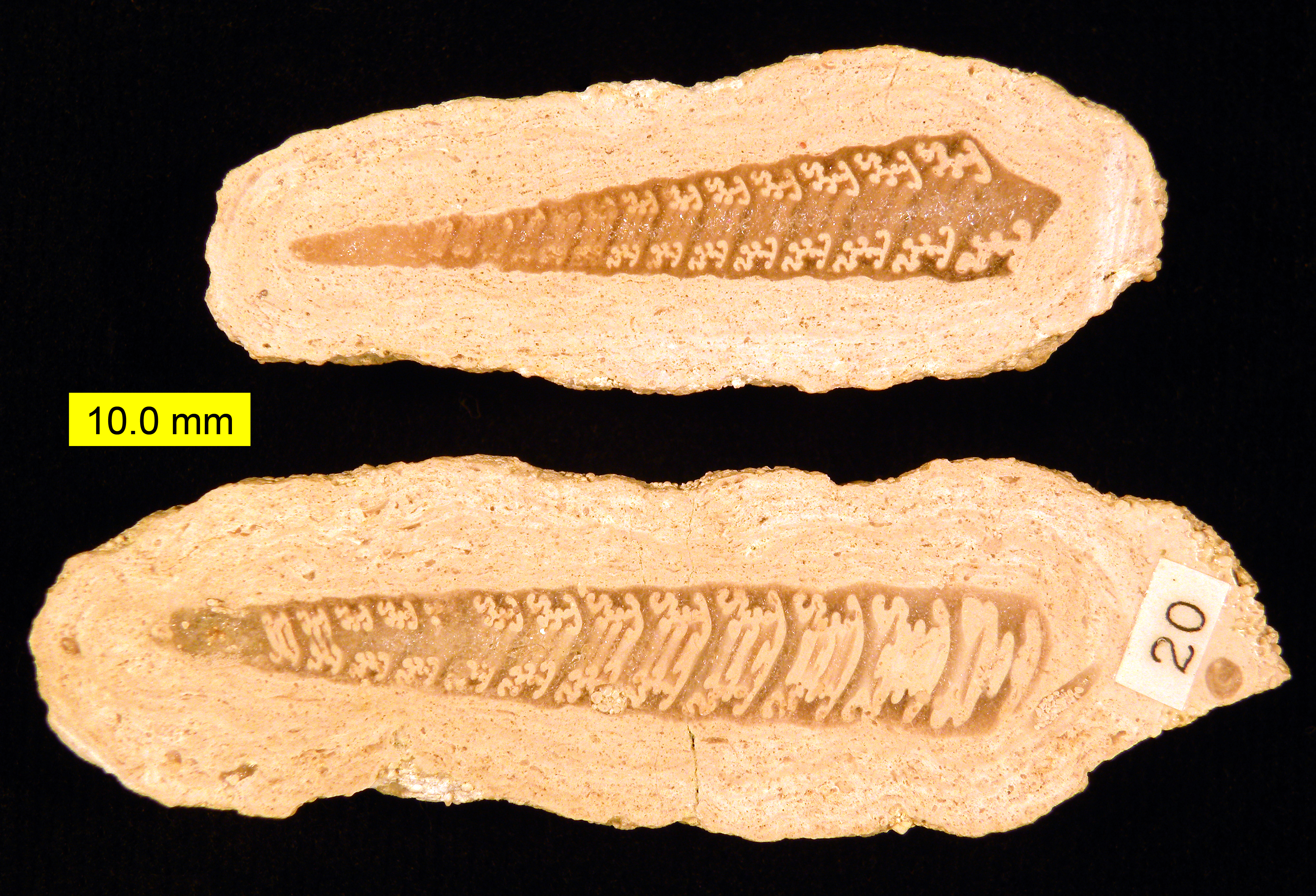
- Bactroptyxis trachaea, Aubry-en-exmes, Normandy, France; Middle Jurassic (Bathonian).

Scientific classification
- Kingdom: Animalia
- Phylum: Mollusca
- Class: Gastropoda
- Superfamily: †Nerineoidea
- Family: †Nerineidae; Zittel, 1873

= Nerineidae =

Extinct family of gastropods

Nerineidae is an extinct family of fossil sea snails, marine gastropod molluscs in the clade Heterobranchia.

== Genera ==
Genera within the family Nerineidae include:

- Nerinea, the type genus
- Bactroptyxis

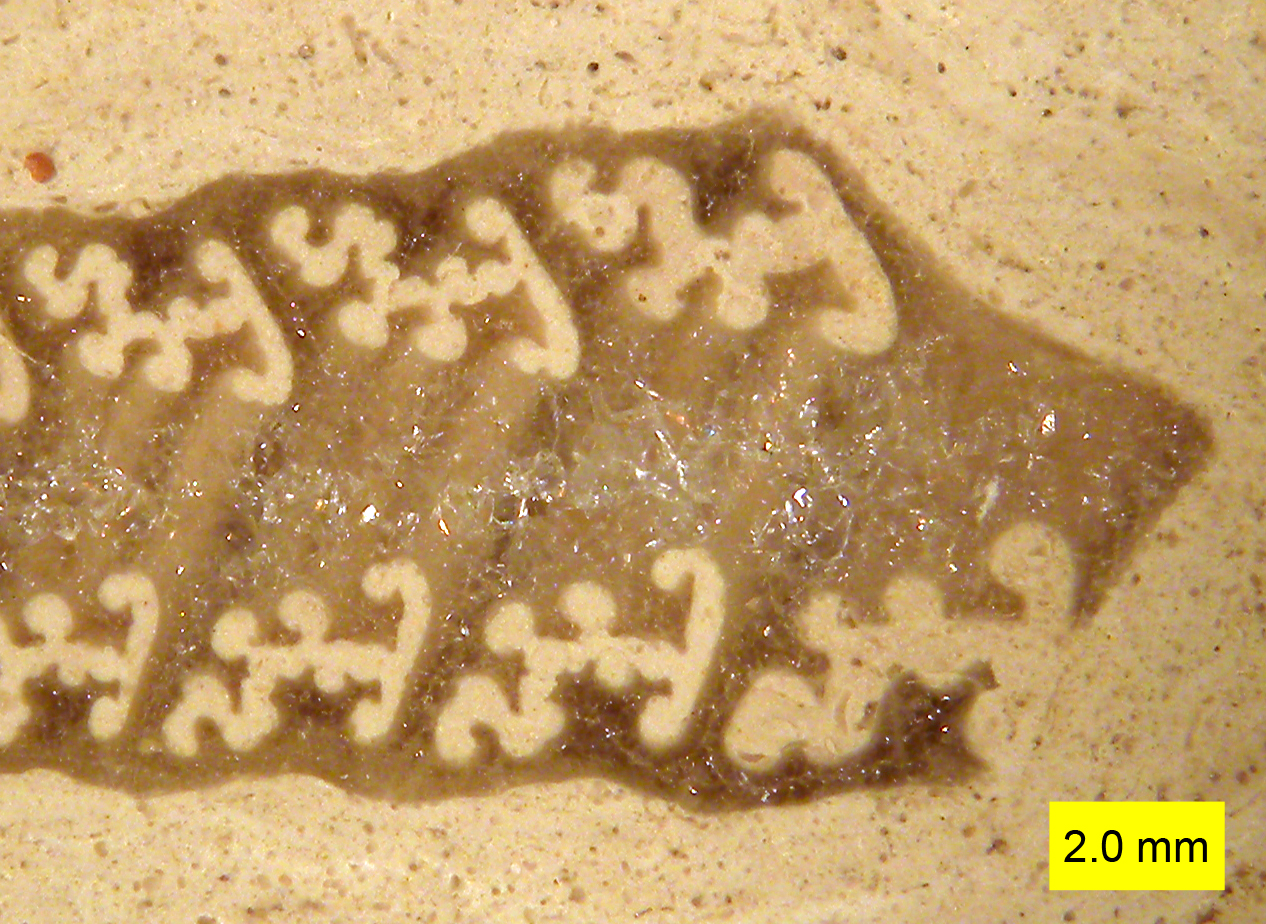
Bactroptyxis trachaea, Aubry-en-exmes, Normandy, France; Middle Jurassic (Bathonian). Close-up view of interior.
