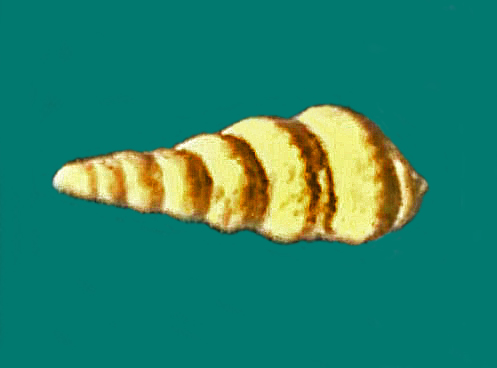
- Fossil of Zygopleura variabilis on display at Haus der natur, Salzburg

Scientific classification
- Kingdom: Animalia
- Phylum: Mollusca
- Class: Gastropoda
- Subclass: Caenogastropoda
- Family: †Zygopleuridae
- Subfamily: †Zygopleurinae
- Genus: †Zygopleura; Koken, 1892

= Zygopleura =

Zygopleura Temporal range: Carboniferous - Paleocene

Extinct genus of gastropods

Zygopleura is an extinct genus of fossil sea snails, marine gastropod molluscs in the family Zygopleuridae.

== Fossil record ==
These extinct sea snails lived from the Carboniferous to the Paleocene( Age range: 326.4 to 48.6 million years ago), The fossils were found in Turkey, Chile, Germany, Hungary, India, Israel, Italy, Luxembourg, New Zealand, Poland, Portugal, Spain, Tanzania, Tunisia, the United Kingdom, Austria, Bosnia and Herzegovina, China, Colombia, Germany, Hungary, Iran, Italy, Oman, Peru, Slovakia, Switzerland, Tunisia and United States.

== Species ==
Species within this genus include:

- † Zygopleura angulata Wanner 1922
- † Zygopleura arctecostata Münster 1841
- † Zygopleura benoisti Cossmann 1907
- † Zygopleura brevis M'Coy 184
- † Zygopleura brevis grossicostta Longstaff 1933
- † Zygopleura dubia Wanner 1922
- † Zygopleura dubia Gemmellaro 1911
- † Zygopleura etalensis Piette 1856
- † Zygopleura geniculata Wanner 1922
- † Zygopleura goldbergi Reiner 1968
- † Zygopleura granietzensis Ahlburg 1906
- † Zygopleura haasi Batten and Stokes 1986
- † Zygopleura hybrida Münster 1841
- † Zygopleura nitida Wanner 1922
- † Zygopleura numidis Termier and Termier 1977
- † Zygopleura porulosa Terquem 1855
- † Zygopleura simplex Wanner 1922
- † Zygopleura swalloviana Shumard 1859
- † Zygopleura tunisiensis Cox 1969
- † Zygopleura verrucosa Terquem 1855
- † Zygopleura walmstedti Klipstein 1843
- † Zygopleura variabilis (Zapfe, 1962)
- † Zygopleura yunnanensis Pan 1977
