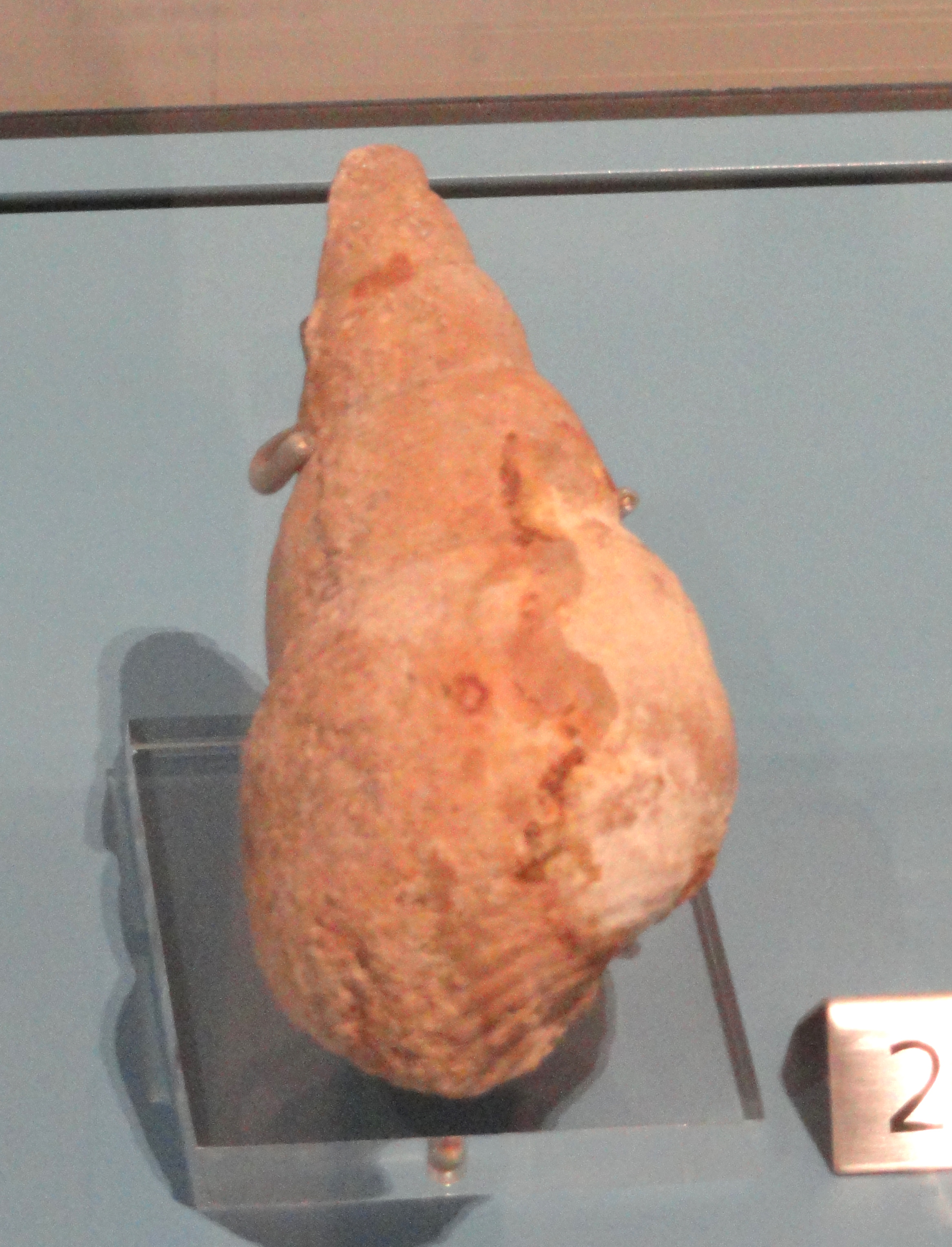
- Bourgetia

Scientific classification
- Kingdom: Animalia
- Phylum: Mollusca
- Class: Gastropoda
- Subclass: Caenogastropoda
- Family: †Pseudomelaniidae
- Genus: †Bourgetia; Terquem & Jourdy, 1870

= Bourgetia =

Extinct genus of gastropods

†Bourgetia is an extinct genus of fossil sea snails, marine gastropod mollusks in the family Pseudomelaniidae.

== Species ==
Species within the genus Bourgetia include:

- Bourgetia saemanni (Oppel, 1856) - synonyms: Melania striata Sowerby; Phasianella striata Sowerby; Phasianella sämanni Oppel; Bourgetia striata Sowerby
