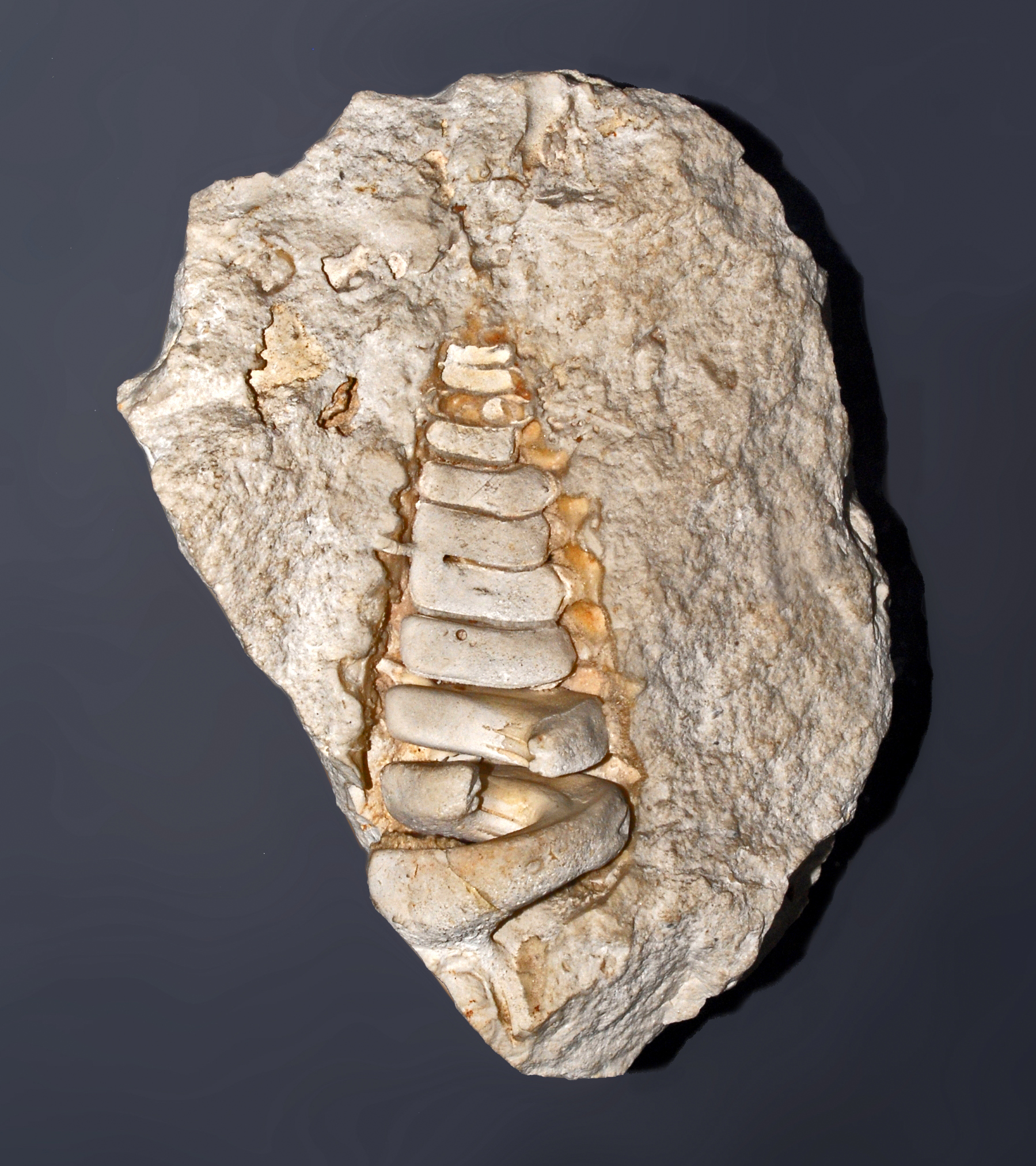
- Fossil shell of Nerinea from Italy

Scientific classification
- Kingdom: Animalia
- Phylum: Mollusca
- Class: Gastropoda
- Family: †Nerineidae
- Genus: †Nerinea; Deshayes, 1827

= Nerinea =

Nerinea Temporal range: Jurassic–Cretaceous

Extinct genus of gastropods

Nerinea is an extinct genus of fossil sea snails, marine gastropod molluscs in the clade Heterobranchia.

== Fossil record ==
This genus is present from the Jurassic to the Cretaceous periods. Fossils are known from various localities of Europe, Africa, North America, South America, United States, Colorado river and New Zealand.

== Species ==
Species in the genus Nerinea include:

- Nerinea desvoidyi D'Orbigny, 1921
- Nerinea gachupinae Alencaster, 1977
- Nerinea higoensis Shikama & Yui, 1973
- Nerinea koikensis Shikama & Yui, 1973
- Nerinea naumanni Sugiyama & Asao, 1942
- Nerinea rigida Nagao, 1934
- Nerinea schickii - from Early Cretaceous, Albian - Syria
- Nerinea shiidai Shikama & Yui, 1973
- Nerinea somaliensis Weir, 1925
- Nerinea somensis Shikama & Yui, 1973
- Nerinea sugiyamai Shikama & Yui, 1942
- Nerinea suprjurensis Voltz - from Middle Jurassic, Upper Oolite. Porrentruy, Switzerland.
- Nerinea syriaca Conrad - from Early Cretaceous, Albian - Syria
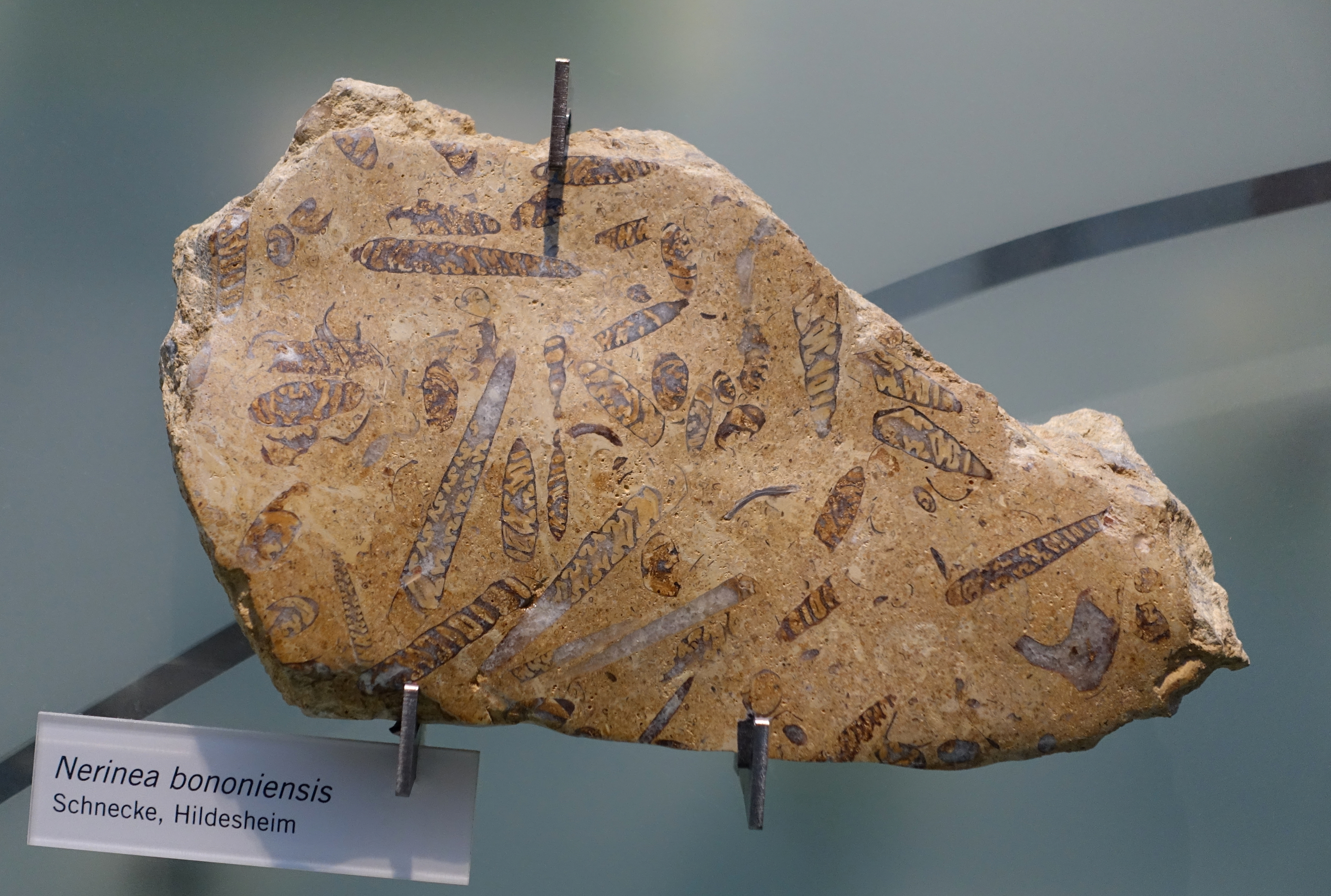
Nerinea bononiensis

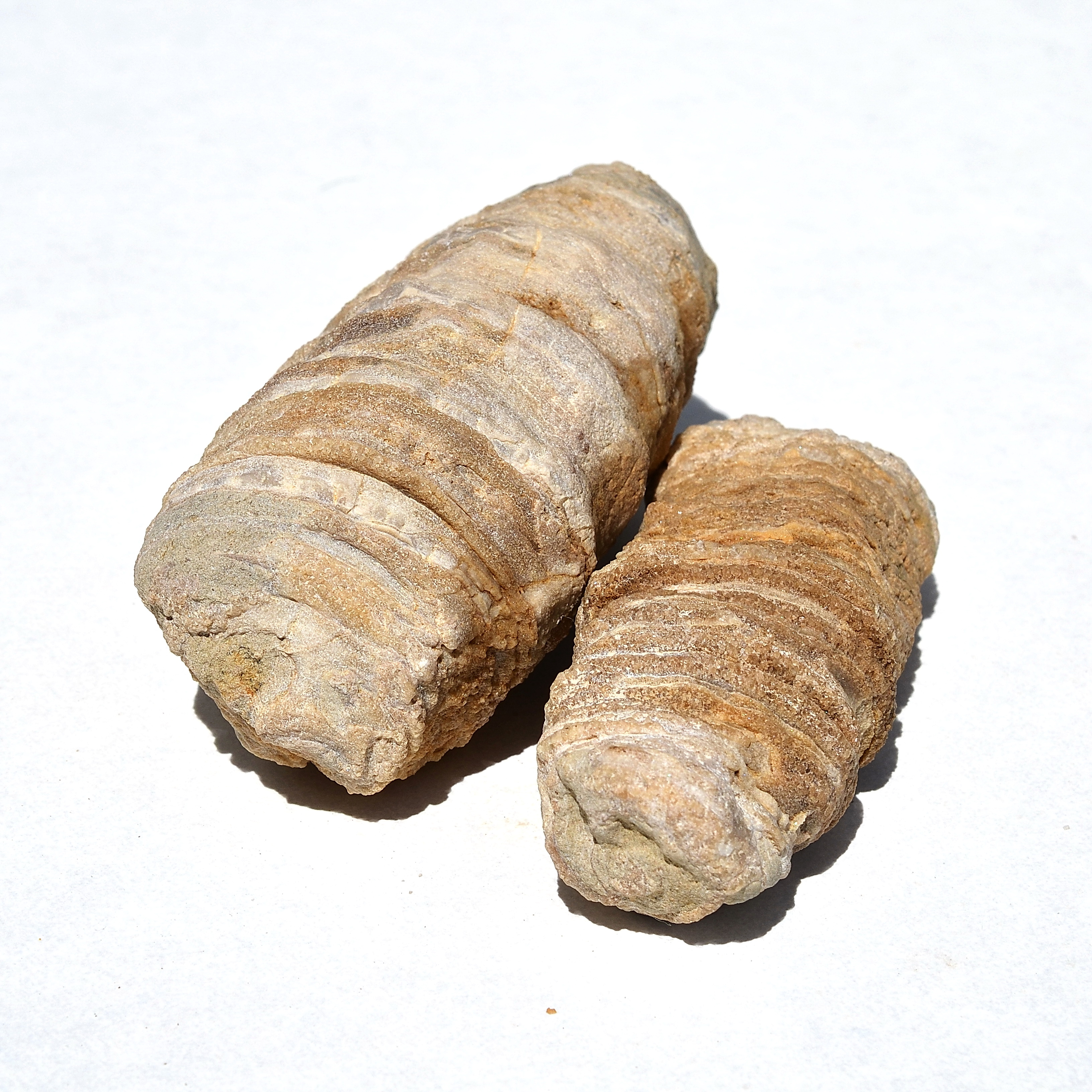
Nerinea fossils

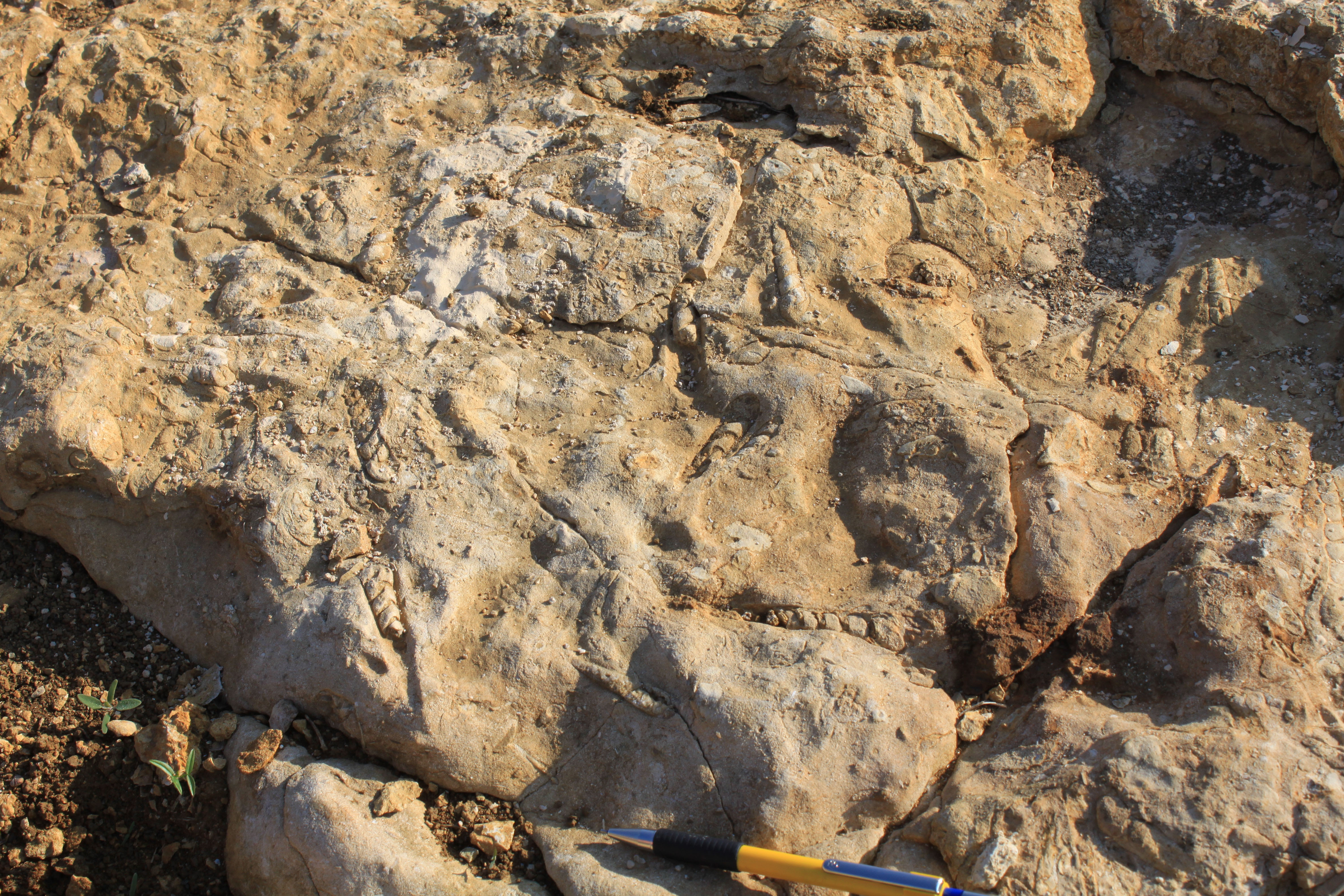
Nerinea fossils
