= Trajanellidae =

Scientific classification
- Kingdom: Animalia
- Phylum: Mollusca
- Class: Gastropoda
- Subclass: Caenogastropoda
- Superfamily: †Pseudomelanioidea
- Family: †Trajanellidae; Pchelintsev, 1951

Extinct family of gastropods

Trajanellidae is an extinct family of fossil sea snails, marine gastropod molluscs in the clade Caenogastropoda.

== Genera ==
Genera within the family Trajanellidae include:

- Trajanella Popovici-Hatzeg, 1899, the type genus (type species = † Eulima amphora d’Orbigny, 1842)
