= Allochiton =

Allochiton Temporal range: Jurassic

Scientific classification
- Domain: Eukaryota
- Kingdom: Animalia
- Phylum: Mollusca
- Class: Polyplacophora
- Order: Chitonida
- Family: Mopaliidae
- Subfamily: †Heterochitoninae
- Genus: †Allochiton

Extinct genus of molluscs

Allochiton is an extinct genus of polyplacophoran molluscs. Allochiton became extinct during the Jurassic period.
