= Dictyothyris =

Dictyothyris Temporal range: Middle Jurassic - Early Cretaceous

Scientific classification
- Kingdom: Animalia
- Phylum: Brachiopoda
- Class: Rhynchonellata
- Order: Terebratulida
- Family: †Dictyothyrididae
- Genus: †Dictyothyris; Douvillé, 1879

Type species
- Terebratula coarctatus Parkinson, 1811

Species
- See text

Extinct genus of brachiopods

Dictyothyris is an extinct genus of brachiopods that lived from the Middle Jurassic to the Early Cretaceous throughout what is now Europe and North Africa.

== Description ==
Like members of the Class Rhynchonellata, it is possible that members of this genus were blind. They were also likely stationary suspension feeders, relying upon ocean currents to obtain food.

== Species ==
Species in the genus Dictyothyris include:

- D. badensis Rollier, 1918
- D. coarctata (Parkinson, 1811)
- D. dorsocurva (Etallon, 1863)
- D. gzheliensis (Gerassimov, 1955)
- D. kurri? (Oppel, 1857)
- D. laneolata Buckman, 1917
- D. luszowicensis Rollier, 1918
- D. rollieri Haas, 1889
- D. rossii (Canavari, 1882)
- D. smithi (Oppel, 1857)
- D. spinulosa Smirnova, 1968
