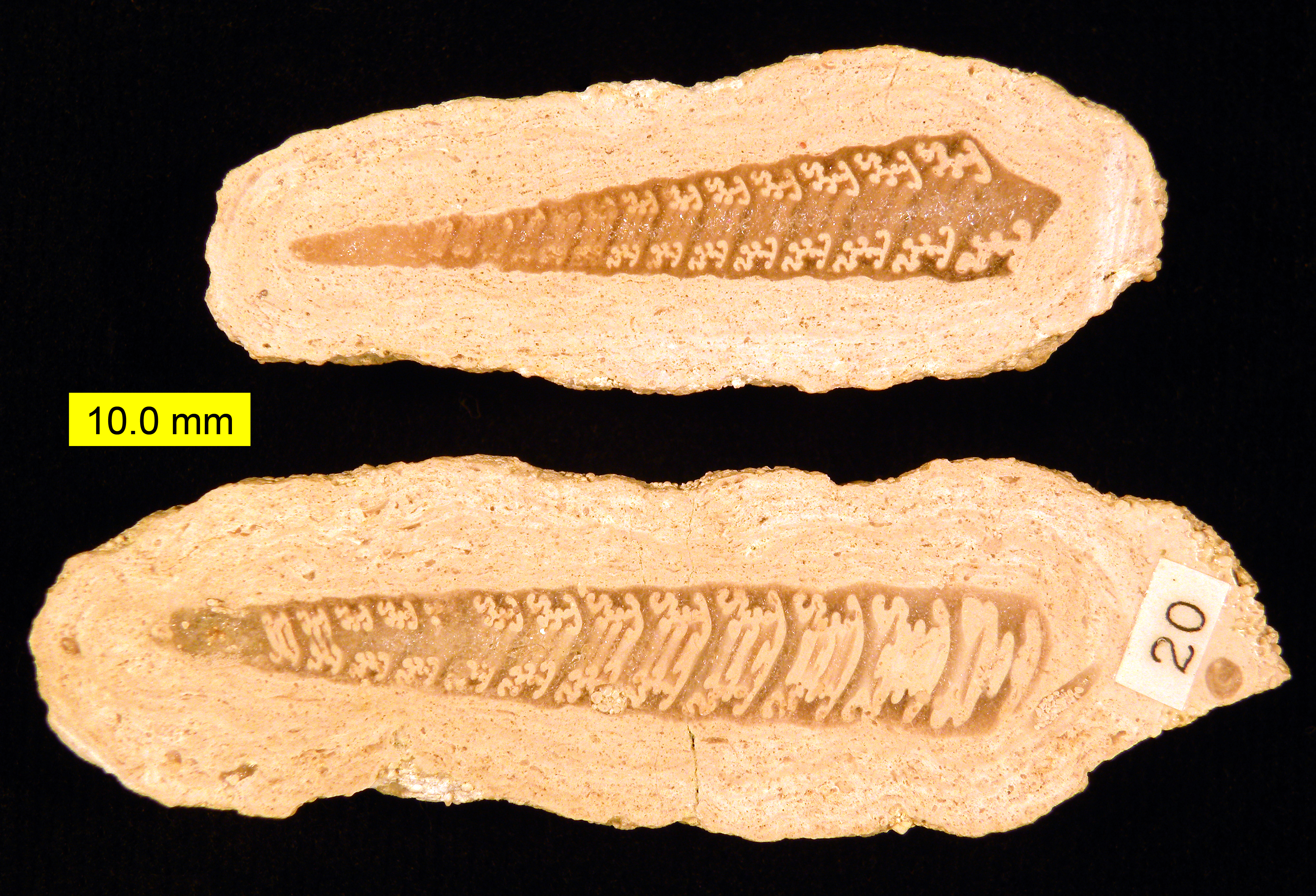
- Bactroptyxis trachaea, from Middle Jurassic, family Nerineidae

Scientific classification
- Kingdom: Animalia
- Phylum: Mollusca
- Class: Gastropoda
- Subclass: Heterobranchia
- Infraclass: incertae sedis
- Superfamily: †Nerineoidea; Zittel, 1873

Families
- See text

= Nerineoidea =

Superfamily of gastropods

Nerineoidea is a superfamily of extinct sea snails, fossil marine gastropod molluscs in the clade Heterobranchia.

== Families ==
Families within the superfamily Nerineoidea include:

- † Family Nerineidae
- † Family Ceritellidae
- † Family Nerinellidae
