= Ceritellidae =

Scientific classification
- Kingdom: Animalia
- Phylum: Mollusca
- Class: Gastropoda
- Superfamily: †Nerineoidea
- Genus: †Ceritellidae; Wenz, 1938 (1895)

Extinct family of gastropods

Ceritellidae is an extinct family of sea snails, marine gastropod molluscs in the clade Heterobranchia.
