= Heterochiton =

Heterochiton Temporal range: Jurassic

Scientific classification
- Domain: Eukaryota
- Kingdom: Animalia
- Phylum: Mollusca
- Class: Polyplacophora
- Order: Chitonida
- Family: Mopaliidae
- Subfamily: †Heterochitoninae
- Genus: †Heterochiton; Graebner et Mattfeld in Ascherson et Graebner, 1919

Extinct genus of molluscs

Heterochiton is an extinct genus of polyplacophoran mollusc. Heterochiton became extinct during the Jurassic period.
