= John Lycett =

British paleontologist

John Lycett (1804-1882) was an English paleontologist. He was a physician at Minchinhampton from c.1840-1860. In 1860 he moved to Scarborough in Yorkshire and the "wide dispersal of his magnificent collection of fossils from this area [quarries on Minchinhampton Common ] commenced". His monograph on the Great Oolite is one of just a handful of monographs describing and illustrating the British Jurassic gastropod and bivalve fauna.

He was awarded the Lyell Medal by the Geological Society of London in 1882.

== Works ==
- 1851-1854 with the geologist John Morris A monograph of the Mollusca from the Great Oolite. Volume 1, Chiefly from Minchinhampton and the coast of Yorkshire (in three parts published between 1850 and 1854, covering cephalopods, gastropods and worms as well as bivalves).
- 1863 with John Morris A Monograph of the Mollusca from the Great Oolite Supplement - Volume 2: Mollusca from the Stonesfield Slate, Great Oolite, Forest Marble, and Cornbrash.
- 1857 The Cotteswold Hills. Hand-book introductory to their geology and palaeontology. Piper, Stephenson and Spence, London.

== Taxa established by Morris & Lycett ==
partial list

- Megalodontidae Morris & Lycett, 1853
- Purpuroidea Lycett, 1848
- Nododelphinula buckmani (Morris & Lycett, 1850
- Amberleya J. Morris & Lycett, 1851
- Plagiostoma bellula Morris and Lycett 1853
