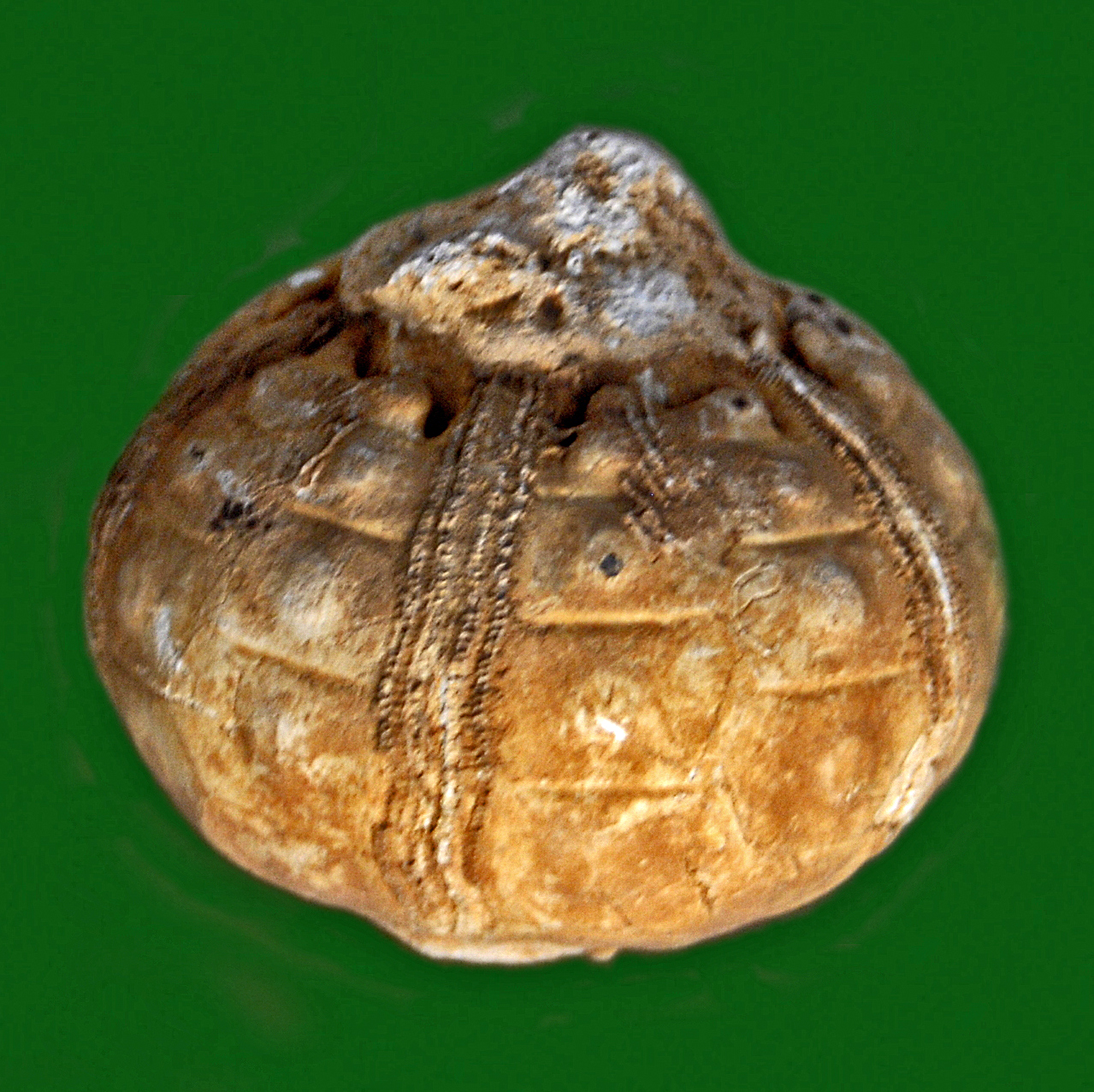
- Fossil inner cast of Diplocidaris gigantea, on display at Galerie de paléontologie et d'anatomie comparée in Paris

Scientific classification
- Domain: Eukaryota
- Kingdom: Animalia
- Phylum: Echinodermata
- Class: Echinoidea
- Order: Cidaroida
- Family: †Diplocidaridae; Gregory, 1900

= Diplocidaridae =

Diplocidaridae Temporal range: Jurassic

Extinct family of sea urchins

Diplocidaridae is an extinct family of sea urchins.

These slow-moving low-level epifaunal grazer-omnivores lived in the Jurassic period, from 161.2 to 150.8 Ma.

== Generas ==
- Diplocidaris Desor, 1855
- Tetracidaris Cotteau, 1872
