= Miocidaris =

Miocidaris Temporal range: Middle Permian–Sinemurian

Scientific classification
- Kingdom: Animalia
- Phylum: Echinodermata
- Class: Echinoidea
- Order: Cidaroida
- Family: †Miocidaridae
- Genus: †Miocidaris; Döderlein, 1887

Type species
- Miocidaris keyserlingi Geinitz, 1848

Other species
- Miocidaris adrianae Zardini, 1975; Miocidaris amalthei Quenstedt, 1875; Miocidaris platyacantha Nisiyama, 1966; Miocidaris spinulifera Nisiyama, 1966

Extinct genus of sea urchin

Miocidaris is an extinct genus of miocidarid sea urchin that lived from the Permian to the Jurassic period.

== Description ==
The tooth structure of Miocidaris keyserlingi is practically identical to that of modern-day cidarids, while its perignathic girdle structure and the morphology of its hemipyramid likewise display close affinities with modern cidaroids.
