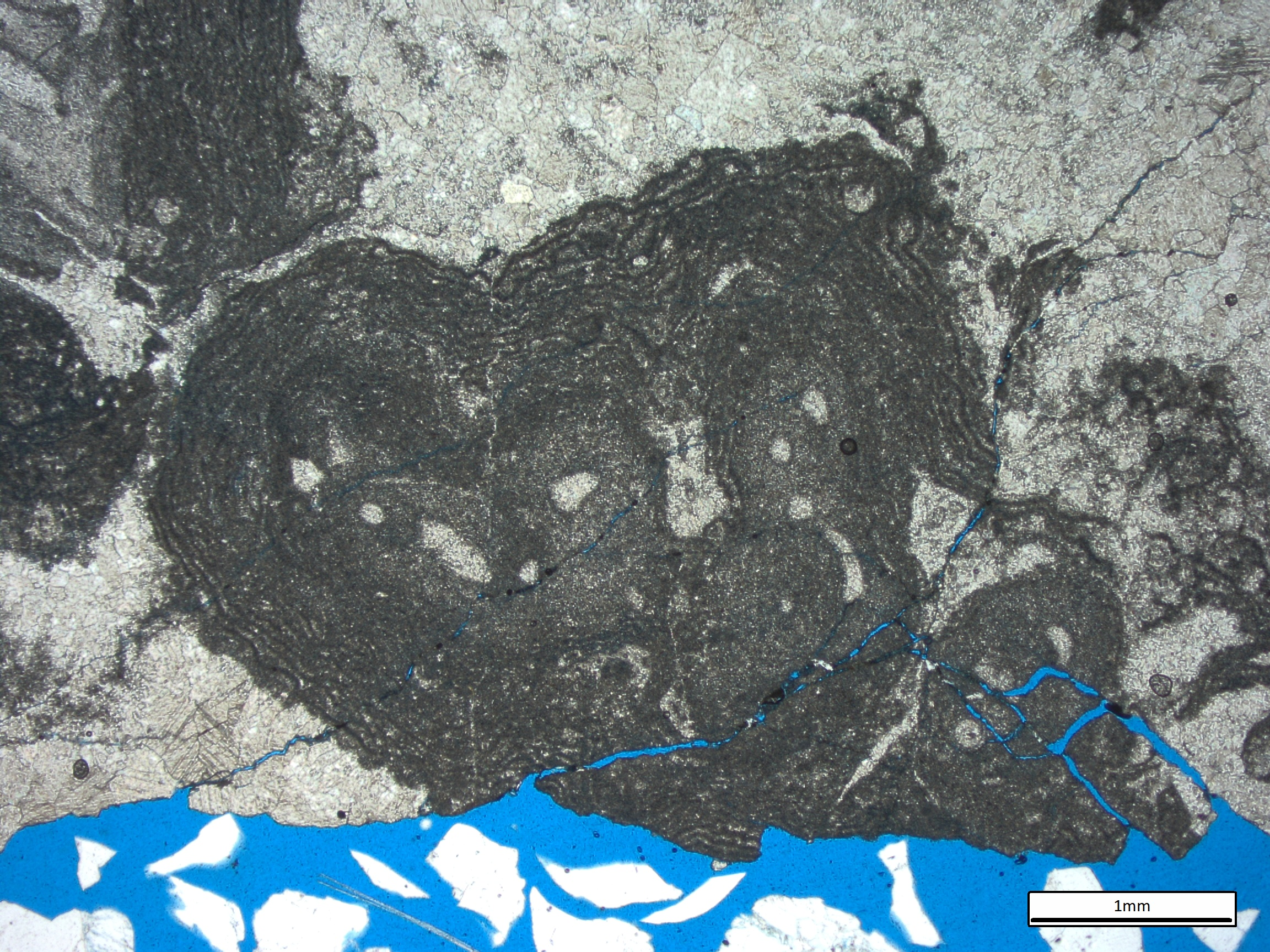
- Cross-section of Tubiphytes sp.

Scientific classification
- (unranked): incertae sedis
- Family: †Nigriporellidae
- Genus: †Tubiphytes; Maslov, 1956

Type species
- Tubiphytes obscurus Maslov, 1956

Species and subspecies
- †T. obscurus Maslov, 1956; †T. obscurus obscurus Maslov, 1956; †T. obscurus shamovella Rauser-Chernoussova, 1950; †T. carnicus Senowbari-Daryan, 2013; †T. ramosus Senowbari-Daryan, 2013; †T. alcicornis Senowbari-Daryan, 2013; †T. tubularis Wu, 1991; †T. lercarensis Senowbari-Daryan and Flügel, 1993; †T. gracilis Schäfer and Senowbari-Daryan, 1983; †T. sosioensis Senowbari-Daryan and Flügel, 1993

= Tubiphytes =

Tubiphytes Temporal range: Carboniferous–Triassic Cretaceous records reassigned into Crescentiella

Extinct genus of enigmatic fossil

Tubiphytes is a genus of enigmatic organism, containing around 8 species ranging from the Carboniferous to Triassic.

== Description ==
Tubiphytes consists of collections of aggregates ranging from cylindrical and elongated to lobate or irregular in shape. These aggregates usually contain chambers of sparite, in varying forms ranging from cylindrical tubes to chambered foraminifer-like structures. These chambers are surrounded by a structure referred to as a "cortex". Other organisms like bryozoans may form the core of Tubiphytes. Some species, such as the aptly named T. spinalis, show a spine-like tube extending to the outside, which is not surrounded by the cortex. The cortex of most species is either lamellar or consists of a web-like network, although in T. rauserae and the dubious T. tubularis it is micritic. Most species of Tubiphytes are either encrusting or exhibit "direct growth", with the net-like growth (both external and internal) of T. sosioensis being an exception. In terms of shape, most are segmented or cylindrical, with T. alcicornis differing due to having a more dendroid shape. The interior structure is mostly tubular, regular, or irregular, with T. alcicornis and T. ramosus being unusual for their multi-branched chambers.

== Classification ==
Tubiphytes (and Nigriporellidae as a whole) has been identified as a number of different lineages, including sponges, red algae, cyanobacteria and hydrozoans. A cyanobacterial or rhodophyte affinity is unlikely due to lacking resemblance to any confirmed examples of these. A hydrozoan affinity is also unlikely due to a lack of a zooid receptacle. The genus being a foraminiferan may be more likely due to various species resembling them, however the type T. obscurus does not match this affinity. Riding and Guo (1992) suggested that Tubiphytes is likely a sponge, due to the growth style and microfabric structure closely resembling them. However, Senowbari-Daryan (2013) does not suggest an affinity for the group, leaving them as "Class and order uncertain".
