= Nerinellidae =

Scientific classification
- Kingdom: Animalia
- Phylum: Mollusca
- Class: Gastropoda
- Superfamily: †Nerineoidea
- Family: †Nerinellidae; Pchelintsev, 1960

Extinct family of gastropods

Nerinellidae is an extinct family of fossil sea snails, marine gastropod mollusks in the clade Heterobranchia.

== Genera ==
Genera within the family Nerinellidae include:

- Nerinella, the type genus
