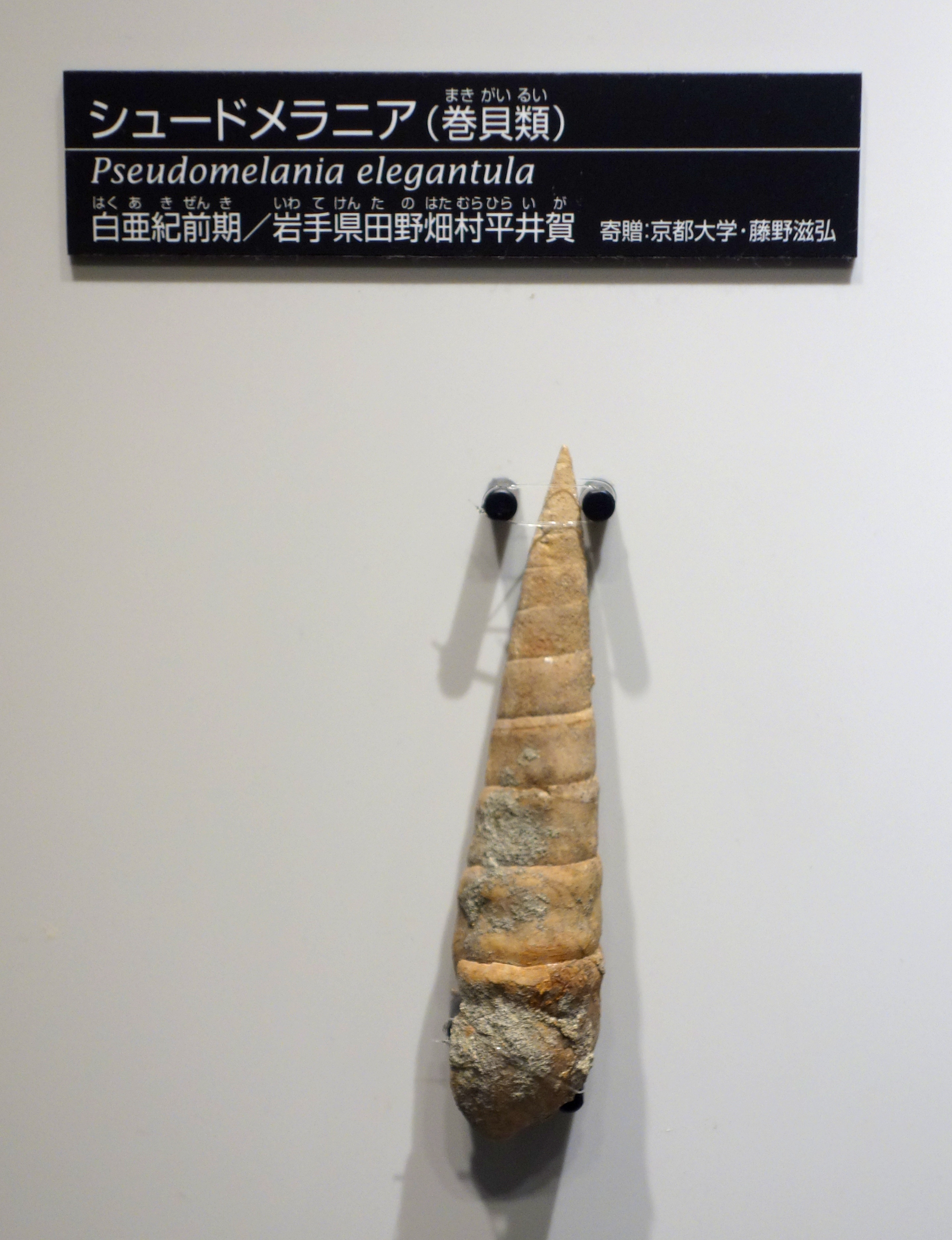
- Pseudomelania elegantula

Scientific classification
- Kingdom: Animalia
- Phylum: Mollusca
- Class: Gastropoda
- Subclass: Caenogastropoda
- Superfamily: †Pseudomelanioidea
- Family: †Pseudomelaniidae; R. Hoernes, 1884

= Pseudomelaniidae =

Extinct family of gastropods

Pseudomelaniidae is an extinct family of fossil sea snails, marine gastropod mollusks in the clade Caenogastropoda.

== Genera ==
Genera within the family Pseudomelaniidae include:

- Angulasina Gründel, 2012
- Bourgetia Terquem & Jourdy, 1870
- Fusoidella Wenz, 1938
- Hudlestonella Cossmann, 1909
- Liocium Gabb, 1869
- Malbalnella Korotkov, 1994
- Mesospira Cossmann, 1892
- Paosia Böhm, 1895
- Pericarinata Pan, 1982
- Pseudomelania Pictet & Campiche, 1862 - the type genus
- Ramina - synonym: Rama Böhm, 1895
  - Ramina ptychitica Kittl, 1894
