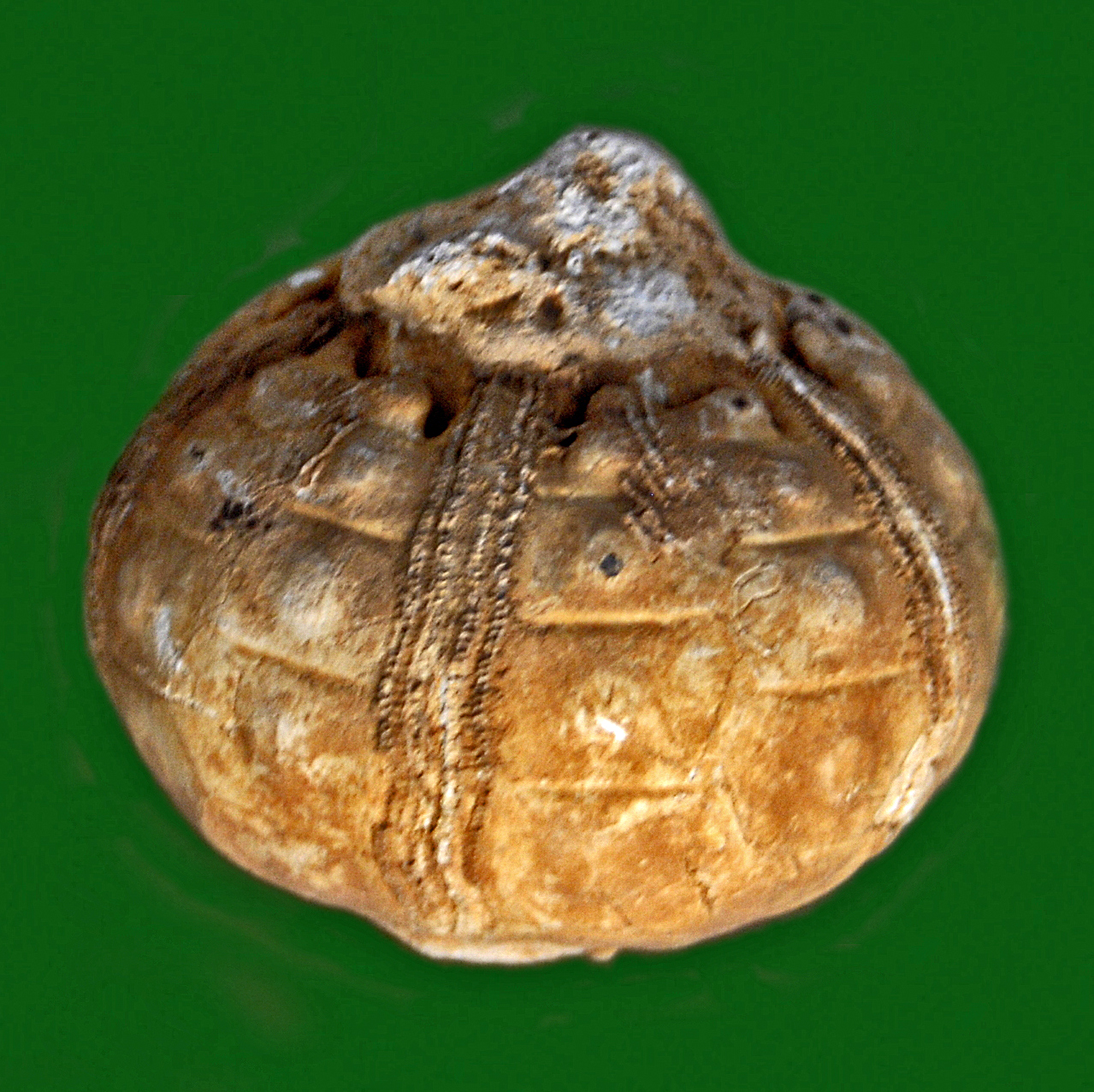
- Fossil inner cast of Diplocidaris gigantea, on display at Galerie de paléontologie et d'anatomie comparée in Paris

Scientific classification
- Kingdom: Animalia
- Phylum: Echinodermata
- Class: Echinoidea
- Order: Cidaroida
- Family: †Diplocidaridae
- Genus: †Diplocidaris; Desor, 1855

= Diplocidaris =

Diplocidaris Temporal range: Jurassic

Extinct genus of sea urchins

Diplocidaris is an extinct genus of sea urchins belonging to the family Diplocidaridae. The type species of this genus is Cidaris gigantea Agassiz, 1840.

These slow-moving low-level epifaunal grazer-omnivores lived in the Jurassic period, from 161.2 to 150.8 Ma. Fossils of this genus have been found in the sediments of Europe, North Africa, Madagascar.

== Species ==
- Diplocidaris gigantea (Agassiz, 1840)
- Diplocidaris besairiei Lambert, 1936
- Diplocidaris jacquemonti Lambert, 1910
- Diplocidaris desori Wright, 1858
- Diplocidaris dumortieri Cotteau, 1863
- Diplocidaris gevreyi Lambert in Savin 1902
- Diplocidaris bernasconii Bischof, Hostettler & Menkveld-Gfeller, 2018
