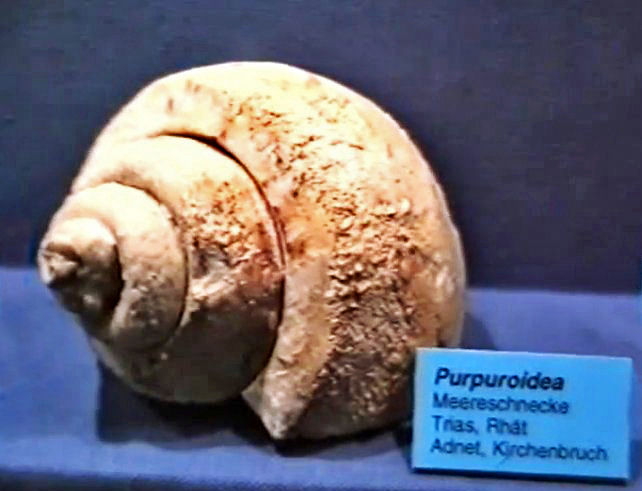
- Fossil of Purpuroidea sp.

Scientific classification
- Kingdom: Animalia
- Phylum: Mollusca
- Class: Gastropoda
- Subclass: Caenogastropoda
- Order: Neogastropoda
- Family: †Purpurinidae; Zittel, 1895

= Purpurinidae =

Family of gastropods

The Purpurinidae are an extinct family of sea snails, marine gastropod molluscs in the order Neogastropoda.

== Fossil record ==
These sea snails lived between the Upper Permian or Lopingian (about 259 million years ago) and the Lower Cretaceous (about 112 million years ago). The fossils were found in Europe (Portugal, France, Luxembourg, Germany, Austria, Italy, Poland, Hungary, Slovenia and Romania), Asia (Israel, Jordan, Saudi Arabia, Iran, Pakistan, India and Japan), North America (Greenland, United States of America and Mexico) and Africa (Tunisia, Ethiopia, Kenya and Tanzania).

== Genera ==
The following genera are recognised in the family Purpurinidae:

- †Cretadmete Blagovetshenskiy & Shumilkin, 2006
- †Microschiza Gemmellaro, 1878
- †Pseudalaria Hudleston, 1889
- †Purpurina d'Orbigny, 1850

== Bibliography ==
- P. L. Beesley, Mollusca: the southern synthesis, in Fauna of Australia, vol. 5, 1998.
- Bouchet, P., Rocroi, J.-P.; Frýda, J.; Hausdorf, B.; Ponder, W.; Valdes, A. and Warén, A., A nomenclator and classification of gastropod family-group names, in Malacologia, nº 1–2, 2005, pp. 1–368.
- Harzhauser, M., Oligocene gastropod faunas for the Eastern Mediterranean (Mesohellenic Trough/Greece and Esfahan-Sirjan Basin/Central Iran), in Courier Forschungsinstitut Senckenberg, vol. 248, 2004, pp. 93–181.
- Harzhauser, M., Oligocene and Aquitanian gastropod faunas from the Sultanate of Oman and their biogeographic implications for the western Indo-Pacific, in Palaeontographica Abteilung A, vol. 280, 2007, pp. 75–121.
- Marquet, R., Pliocene gastropod faunas from Kallo (Oost-Vlaanderen, Belgium) – Part 2. Caenogastropoda: Potamididae-Tornidae, in Contributions to Tertiary and Quaternary Geology, vol. 34, nº 1–2, 1997, pp. 9–29.
- Ponder, W. F. and Warén, A., Appendix: classification of the Caenogastropoda and Heterostropha – A list of the family-group names and higher taxa, in Malacological Review, Suppl. 4, 1988, pp. 288–326.
- Todd, J. A., Systematic list of gastropods in the Panama Paleontology Project collections, 2001.
