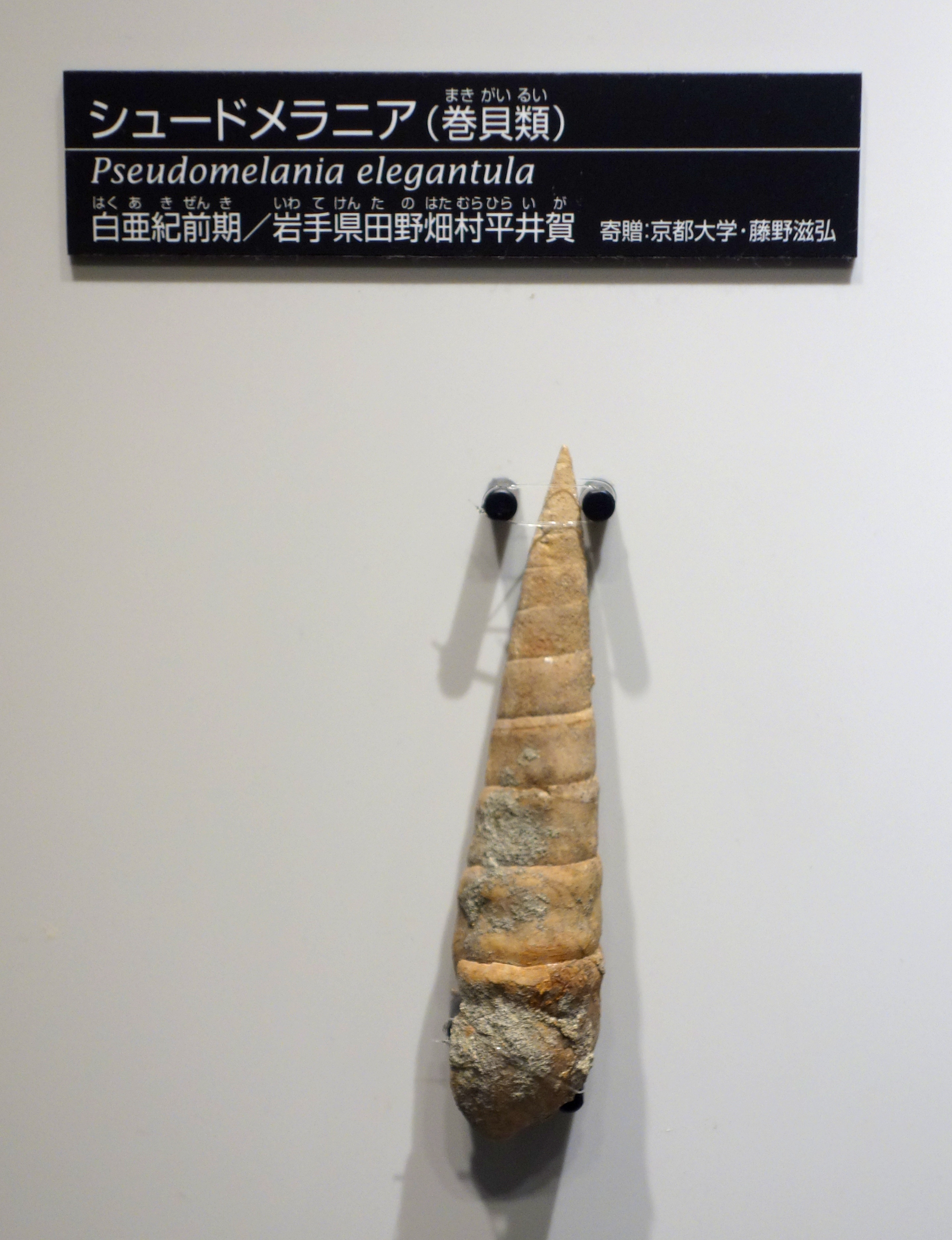
- Pseudomelania elegantula

Scientific classification
- Kingdom: Animalia
- Phylum: Mollusca
- Class: Gastropoda
- Subclass: Caenogastropoda
- Family: †Pseudomelaniidae
- Genus: †Pseudomelania; Pictet & Campiche, 1862

Type species
- Pseudomelania gresslyi Pictet & Campiche, 1862

= Pseudomelania =

Extinct genus of gastropods

Pseudomelania is an extinct genus of Caenogastropid sea snails that belongs to the family Pseudomelaniidae.

== Taxonomy ==
=== Species ===
Many species have been described to belong to this genus. A list of species within the genus Pseudomelania is listed below:

==== Subgenus Hudlestoniella ====
- Pseudomelania (Hudlestoniella) gubleri Delpey, 1941

==== Subgenus Oonia Cossmann, 1885 ====
Synonym: Eligmoloxus

- Pseudomelania (Oonia) incrassata Kittl, 1899
- Pseudomelania (Oonia) pennina Parona, 1892
- Pseudomelania (Oonia subtortilis Münster, 1841
- Pseudomelania (Oonia) texta Kittl, 1899
- Pseudomelania (Oonia) grossouvrei Cossmann, 1899
- Pseudomelania (Oonia) limneiformis Cossmann, 1885
- Pseudomelania (Oonia) similis Münster, 1841

==== Subgenus Rhabdoconcha ====
- Pseudomelania (Rhabdoconcha) spirastriata Wang, 1977
- Pseudomelania (Rhabdoconcha) brongniarti Klipstein, 1843
- Pseudomelania (Rhabdoconcha) schaeferi Kittl, 1894
- Pseudomelania (Rhabdoconcha) triadica Kittl, 1894

==== Unknown subgenus ====
- Pseudomelania aonis Kittl, 1894
- Pseudomelania calloviensis (Hébert & Deslongchamps, 1860)
- Pseudomelania feruglioi Ferrari, 2012
- Pseudomelania frankei Kuhn, 1936
- Pseudomelania gaudryi Kittl, 1894
- Pseudomelania gracilis Mansuy, 1914
- Pseudomelania hagenowi Klipstein, 1843
- Pseudomelania inornata Terquem & Piette 1865
- Pseudomelania miles Kittl, 1894
- Pseudomelania muensteri Wissmann, 1841
- Pseudomelania remtsaensis Cox, 1969
- Pseudomelania subsimilis Kittl, 1894
- Pseudomelania subterebra Kittl, 1894
- Pseudomelania sutherlandii (Baily, 1855)
- Pseudomelania subula Kittl, 1894
