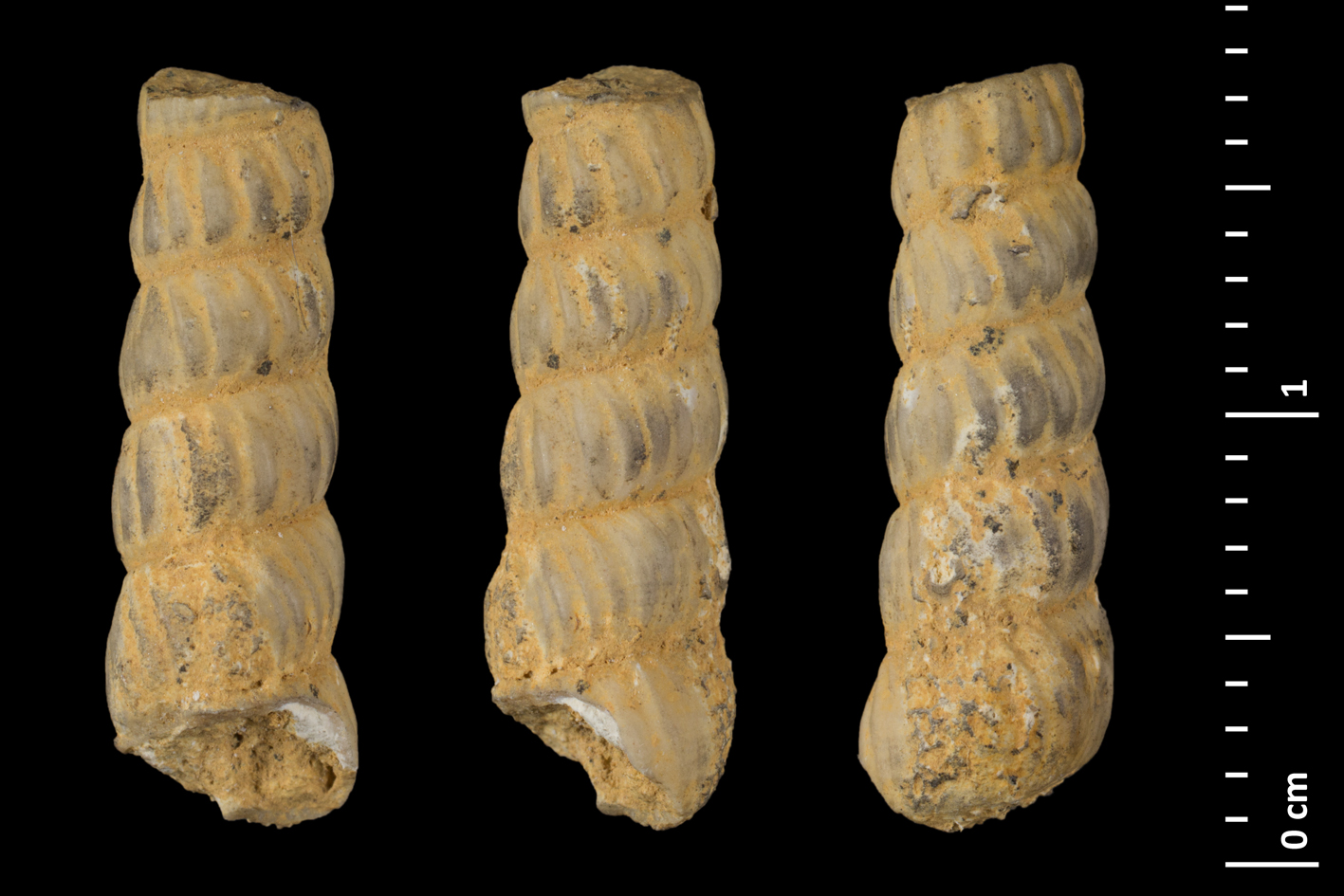
- Fossils of Zygopleura species

Scientific classification
- Kingdom: Animalia
- Phylum: Mollusca
- Class: Gastropoda
- Subclass: Caenogastropoda
- Superfamily: †Pseudozygopleuroidea
- Family: †Zygopleuridae; Wenz, 1938

= Zygopleuridae =

Extinct family of gastropods

†Zygopleuridae is an extinct family of fossil sea snails, marine gastropod molluscs in the clade Caenogastropoda.

== Genera ==
Genera within the family Zygopleuridae include:

- Zygopleura
