= Moltrasio Formation =

Geological formation in Italy and Switzerland

- Stratigraphic range: Hettangian-Sinemurian; ~200–192 Ma
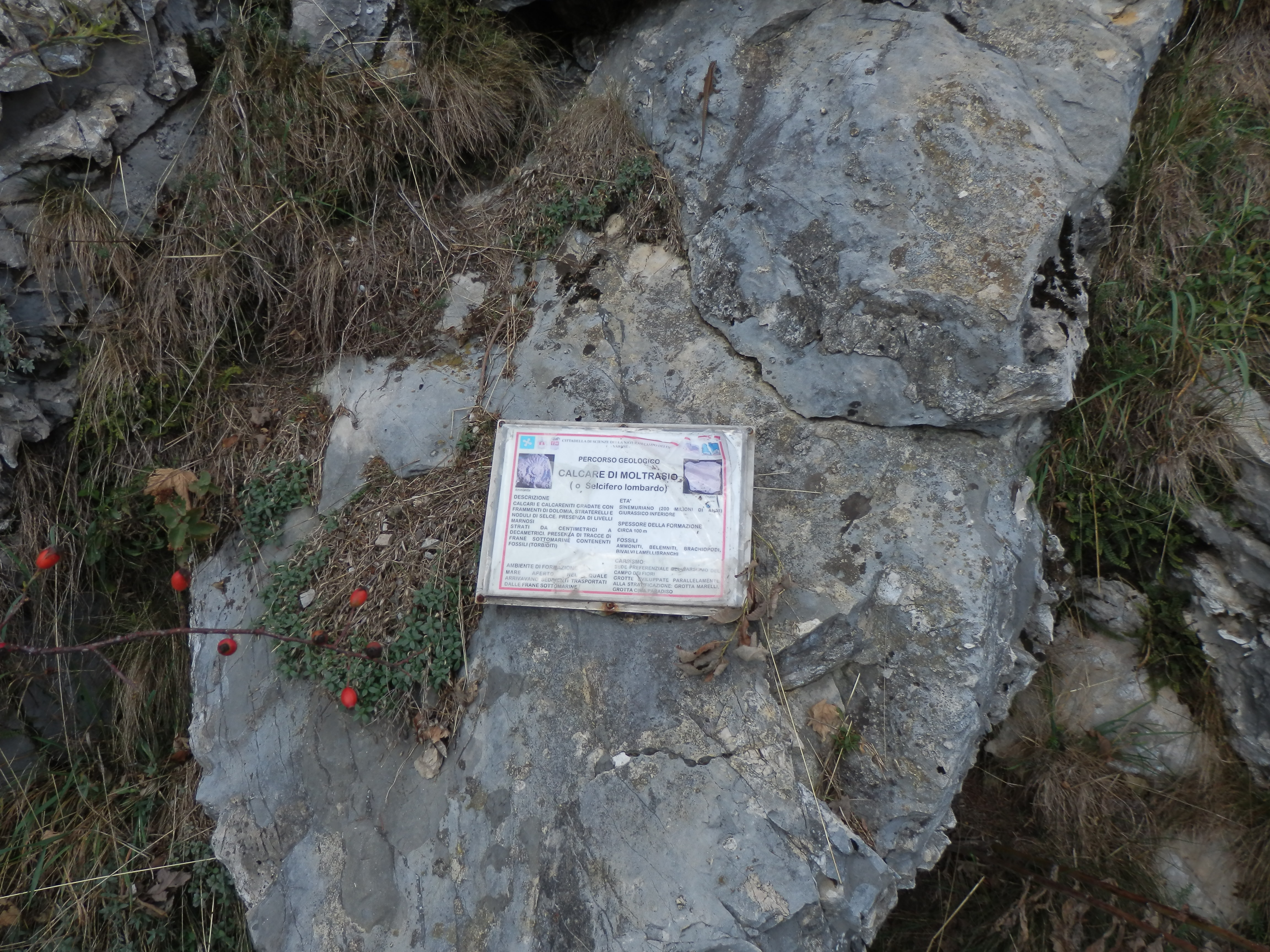
- Outcrop
- Type: Geological formation
- Unit of: Monte Generoso Basin
- Sub-units: "Viggiù facies"; "Saltrio facies"; "Poaggia facies"
- Underlies: Domaro Formation
- Overlies: Sedrina Limestone
- Thickness: 2600 m

Lithology
- Primary: Limestone

Location
- Coordinates: 46.0°N 9.1°E
- Approximate paleocoordinates: 33.2°N 15.6°E
- Region: Lombardy
- Country: Italy, Switzerland

Type section
- Named for: Moltrasio
- Named by: Antonio Stoppani
- Year defined: 1857
- Moltrasio Formation (Italy) Moltrasio Formation (Lombardy)

The Moltrasio Formation (also known as the Lombardische Kieselkalk Formation, Saltrio Formation, Broccatello Formation and Alpe Perino Limestone) is a geological formation in Italy and Switzerland. This Formation mostly developed in the Sinemurian stage of the Lower Jurassic, where on the Lombardian basin tectonic activity modified the current marine and terrestrial habitats. Here it developed a series of marine-related depositional settings, represented by an outcrop of 550–600 m of grey Calcarenites and Calcilutites with chert lenses and marly interbeds, that recovers the Sedrina, Moltrasio and Domaro Formations. This was mostly due to the post-Triassic crisis, that was linked locally to tectonics. The Moltrasio Formation is considered a continuation of the Sedrina Limestone and the Hettangian Albenza Formation, and was probably a shallow water succession, developed on the passive margin of the westernmost Southern Alps. It is known due to the exquisite preservation observed on the Outcrop in Osteno, where several kinds of marine biota have been recovered.

== Utilities ==
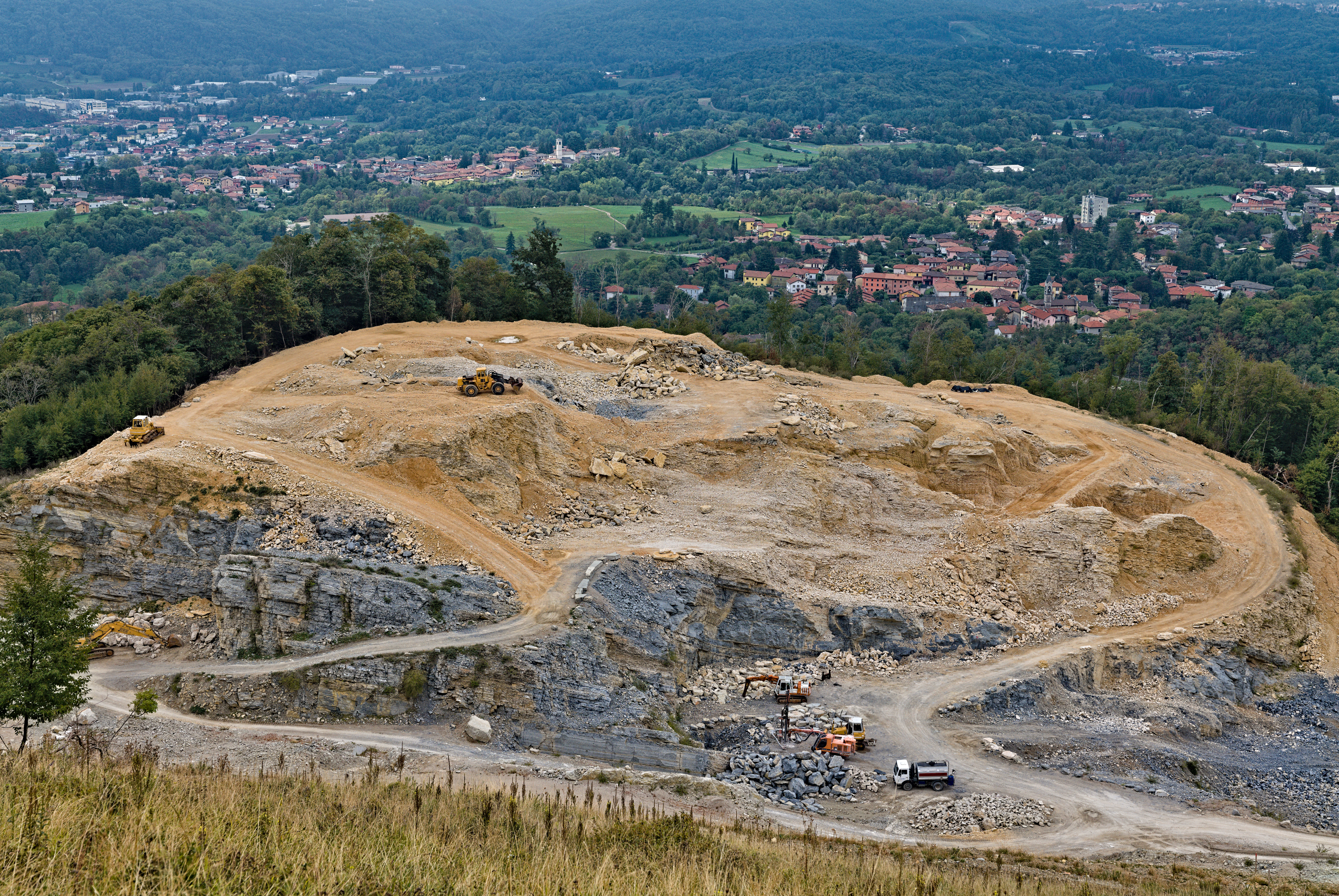
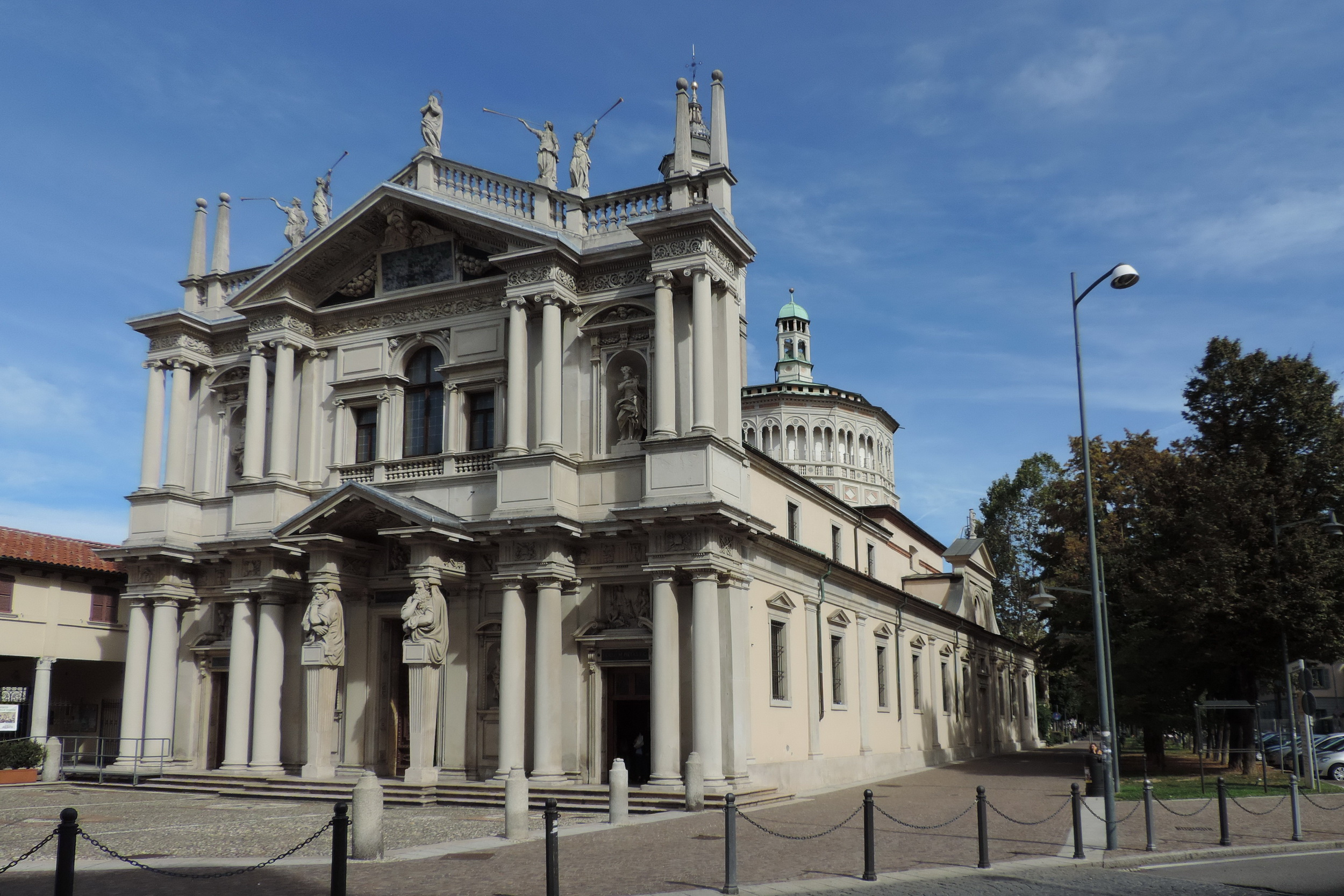
A) Cava Salnova quarry in Saltrio and B) Santuario della Beata Vergine dei Miracoli at Saronno, source and use of the local limestones/sandstones

The first extraction activities of the famous Saltrio & Moltrasio stone give back to the times of the ancient Romans, with modern reports of activity in Salnova quarry since 1400.

In the Monte Oro area, on the southern slope of Monte Orsa, there were numerous trench quarries which were used to extract this precious rock, used both for structural constructions and for the production of artefacts and artistic works. In more recent times the mining activity has been transformed and we have moved from the extraction of stone for construction to the extraction for the production of stabilized and split crushed stone, useful for the production of motorway foundations and mixtures for the production of asphalt. To date it is the only active quarry where Saltrio stone is extracted.

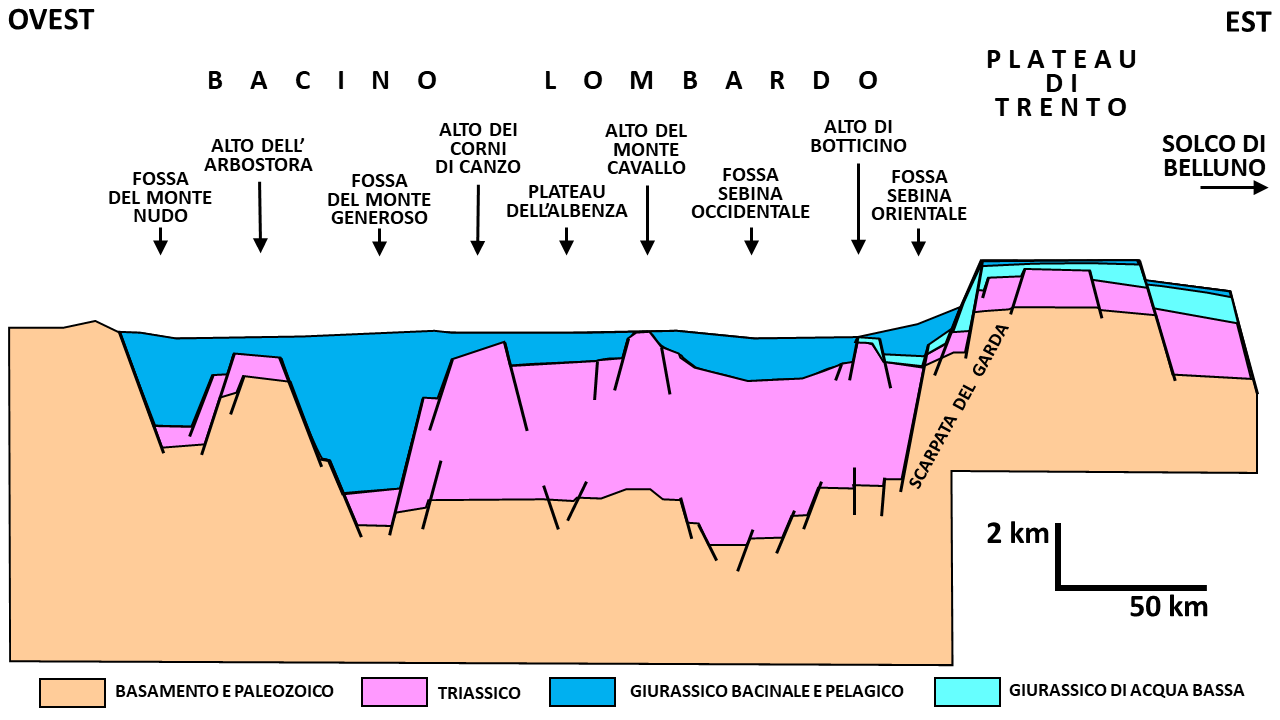
Structural scheme illustrating the syn-rift context of the western Lombardian Basin during late Triassic and early Jurassic.

Above, the Moltrasio limestone emerges, a greyish-brown limestone composed of biocalcarenite and containing widespread nodules of spongolitic silica. This rock is rarely fossiliferous except in the contact areas between the Formations. At the roof of the Moltrasio Fm, a whitish yellow limestone emerges, again of marine-pelagic origin, where there is a lot of micro-diffused silica within the sediment.

Since the early 1900s, fossil finds have been known in the Salnova Quarry and in the various quarry sites present in the surroundings of this site. The first written testimonies, and subsequent revisions, are reported starting from the sixties by Giulia Sacchi Vialli. The scholar describes the fossil faunas of Saltrio by listing and detailing various taxa belonging to ammonoids, nautiloids, gastropods, crinoids, brachiopods and bivalves.

In that period, the great phase of extraction of ornamental stone using manual-mechanical methods had just ended in the quarry. Paleontologists could only recover fossils from the waste flakes near the quarry and therefore the possibility of seeing more specimens was limited to the length of manual operations. In those years, however, the quarry was acquired by Salnova SPA (1969): the purpose of the extracted material, and therefore the extraction method and processing, changed. From classic and manual extraction we move on to the use of heavy mechanical means and extraction with explosives: the moved rubble increases considerably, making it easier to observe other specimens, new lithologies and above all different faunas.

The fauna present at the base of the Moltrasio Formation is condensed and includes ammonoids of species attributed to the entire Sinemurian. The taxa attributable to the Lower Sinemurian found in the Saltrio quarries probably come from the base of the formation or have been reworked. The Formation includes taxa indicative of all the biozones between the Bucklandi Zone (Lower Sinemurian) and the Obtusum Zone, and possibly also of the Oxynotum Zone of the Upper Sinemurian, present at the base of the Formation. The contact between the Main Dolomite and the Moltrasio Formation also contains selachian teeth, glauconite and phosphated internal models of ammonites.

== Description ==
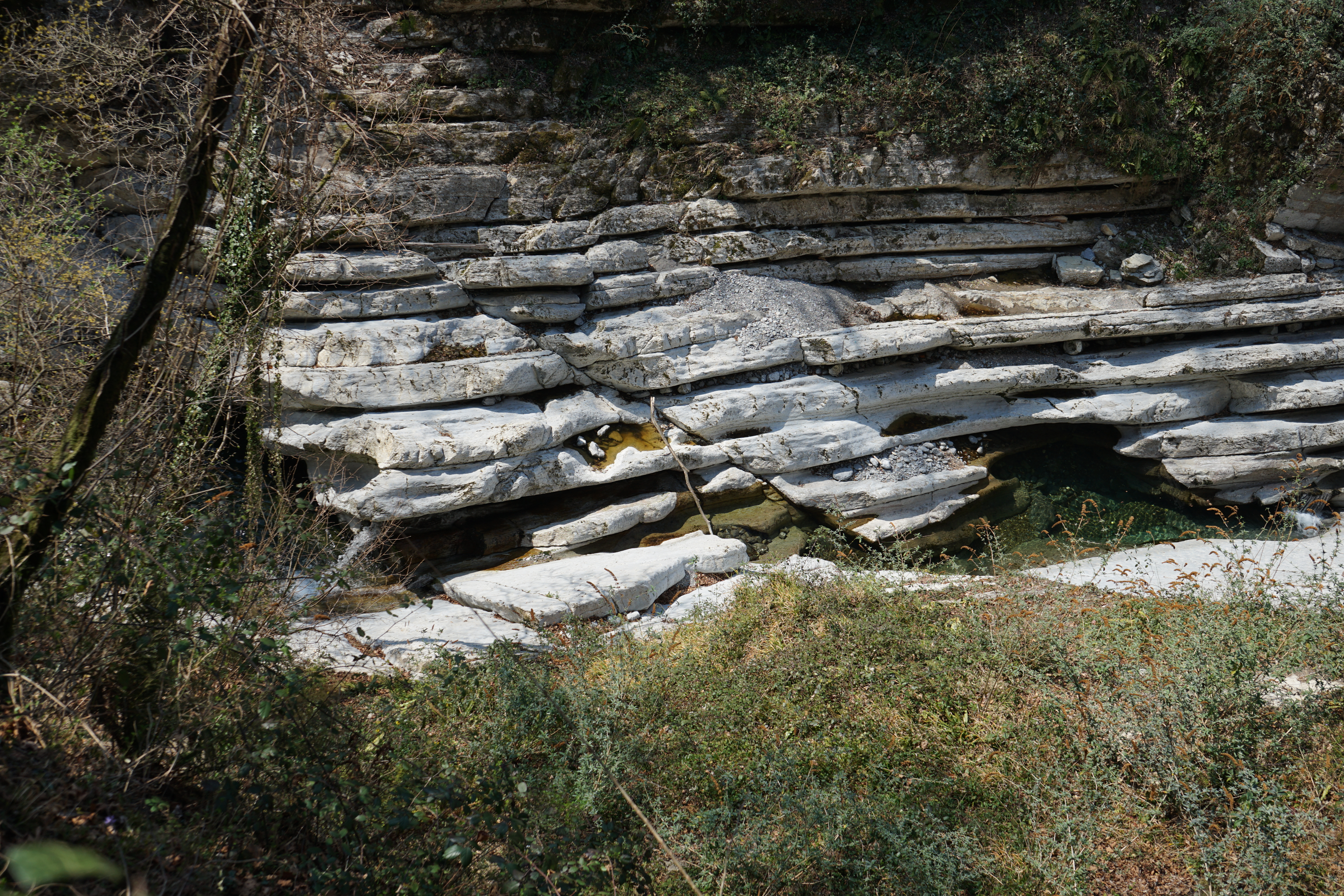
Exposed layers at Parco delle Gole della Breggia, Southern Switzerland

The Moltrasio Limestones record a transgressive episode during which the sea flooded a fault-segmented carbonate platform. Sedimentation was slow and often interrupted, producing condensed successions with bored hardgrounds, glauconite coatings, and local phosphatic grains.

On structural highs, crinoid-rich grainstones and packstones formed encrinitic carpets that were later bored and glauconitized. In nearby grabens, coarse epiclastic calcarenites and rudites accumulated, composed of reworked Triassic platform grains later mixed with crinoid debris. Lower-lying areas preserve thin condensed horizons overlain by dark laminated micrites with sponge spicules, scattered bioclasts, and minor terrigenous and phosphatic material. Along the southern margin, the transgression is marked by reddish calcarenites and litharenites derived from basement rocks.

Basinward, these deposits grade into the spiculitic Kieselkalk, a sponge-rich lime mudstone with interbedded bioclastic and fine terrigenous layers. The Saltrio environment was complex, with different layers showing distinct conditions. In some areas, the Saltrio layers blend with the "Broccatello d'Arzo", a related limestone formation, but they can still be separated based on differences in their structure and fossil content. The region also experienced sedimentary discontinuities, where layers were not deposited continuously, likely due to tectonic activity or submarine erosion.

The stratigraphic sequence at the Galli quarry, located at an elevation of approximately 700 meters on the southeastern flank of the ridge above Saltrio, represents one of the most detailed exposures of the Saltrio Formation. This section, reaching a total thickness of about 17 meters, begins atop underlying dolomite and consists of a series of carbonate-dominated layers that reflect varying depositional conditions in a marine setting.

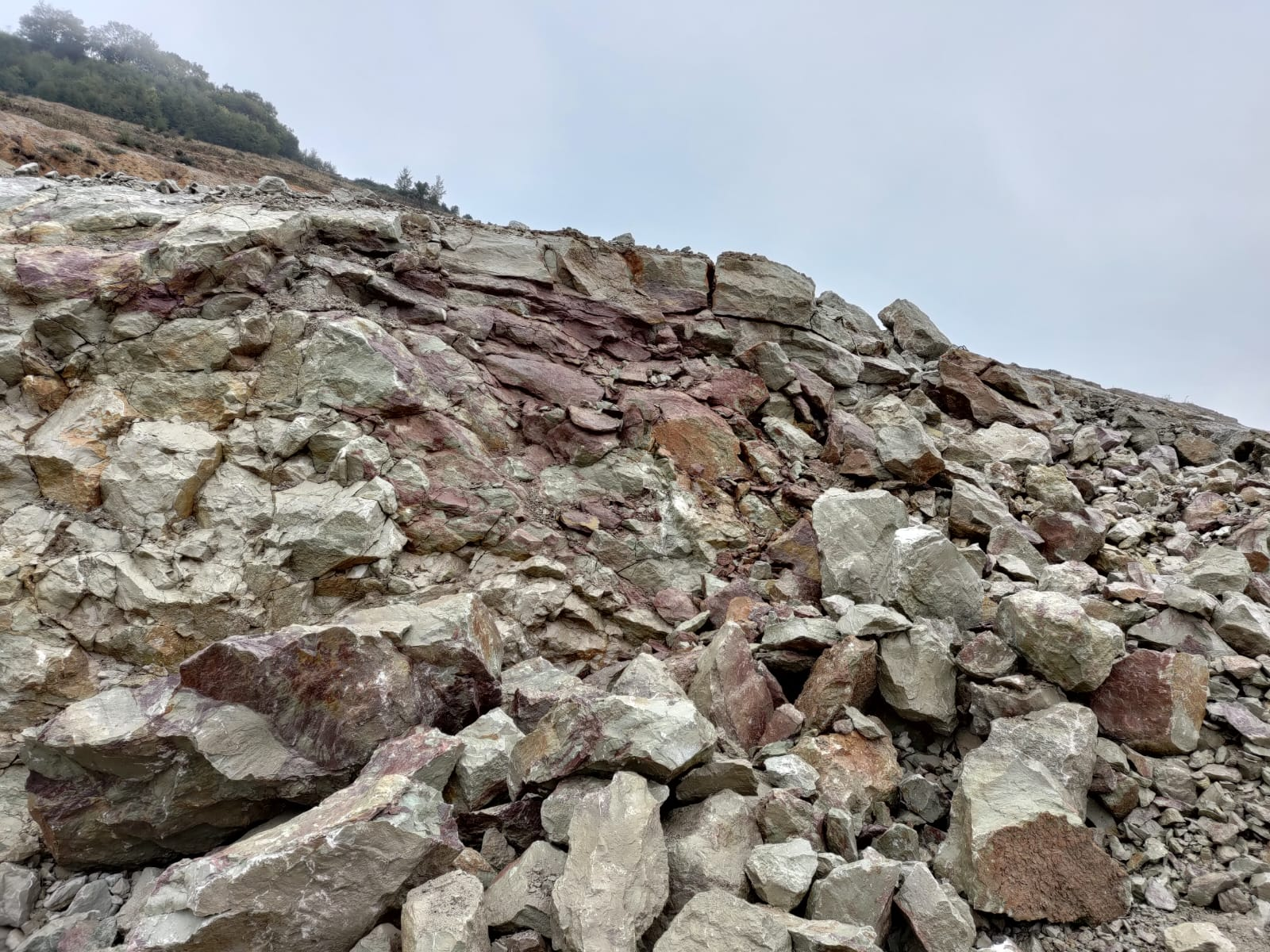
Closeup of the "Saltrio Limestones"

At the base, a thin dolomitic breccia layer (up to 1 meter thick) contains angular dolomite fragments embedded in a lighter calcareous-dolomitic matrix. This is overlain by a 0.3-meter-thick marly limestone with minor detrital components, displaying an olive-gray to greenish hue and iron oxide stains. Next is a 0.8-meter saccharoidal limestone with sparse marl, glauconite, and quartz grains, followed by a thin (0.1–0.2 meter) reddish-brown clay horizon.

Above this, a 1-meter oolitic limestone features intact and broken ooids in a compact calcareous cement, grading from white to grayish-yellow. This transitions into a 3-meter unit of finely to coarsely detrital marly limestone rich in organic fragments, shifting from gray-pink at the base to yellowish upward, with iron oxide patches. A 0.8-meter calcareous breccia with diverse clasts and ooids follows, exhibiting irregular surfaces.

The upper part includes a 5.5-meter marly limestone with minimal detritus, progressing from gray-ashy at the base to dark smoky due to bituminous content. The sequence concludes with a 5-meter dark limestone containing chert nodules, which become more abundant and marly toward the top, before passing into overlying cherty limestones approximately 200 meters thick.

== Paleoenvironment ==
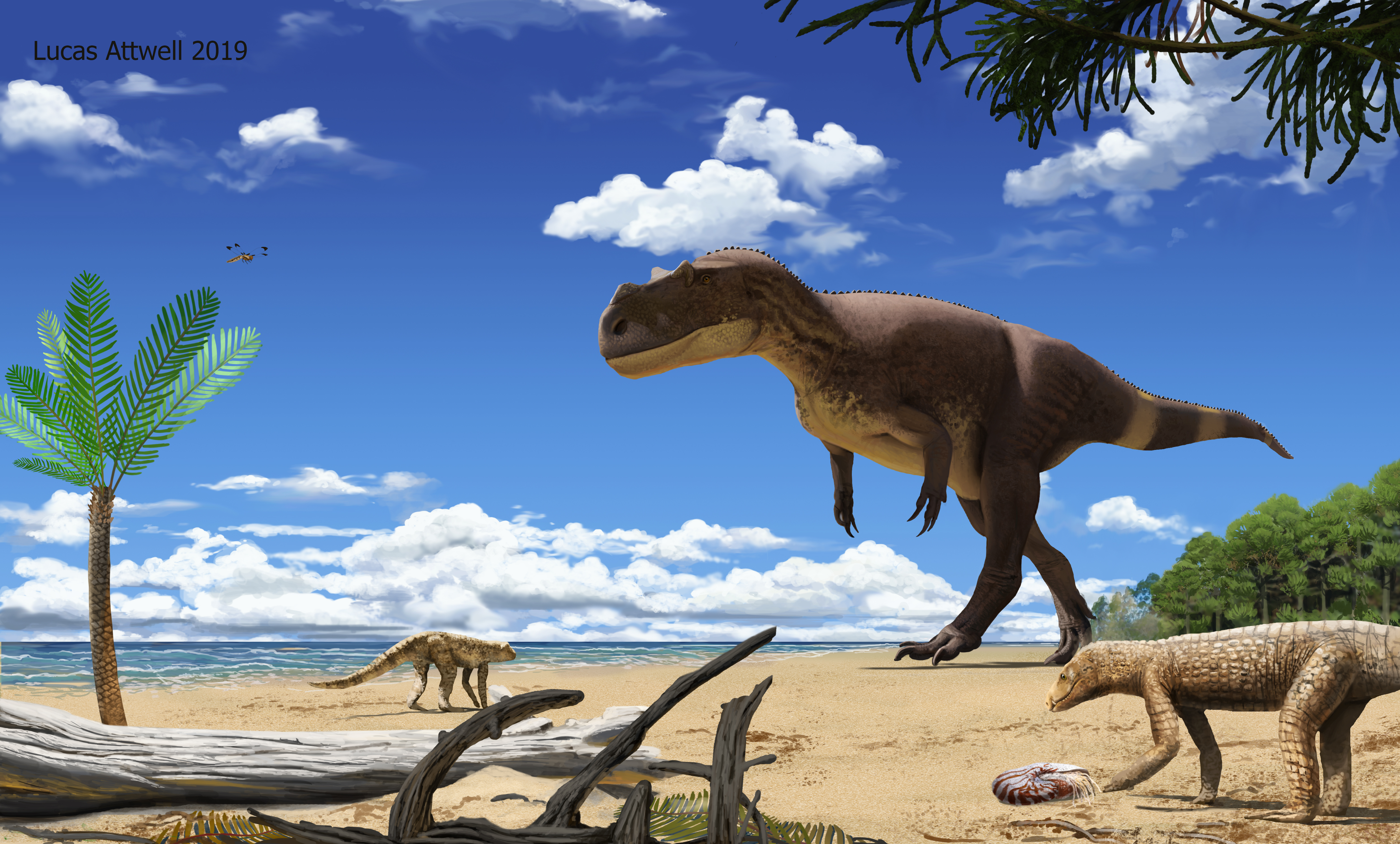
The nearby area at Monte Nudo basin margin was notorious for the dominance of shallow subtidal to intertidal settings with Cheirolepidiaceae conifer forests.

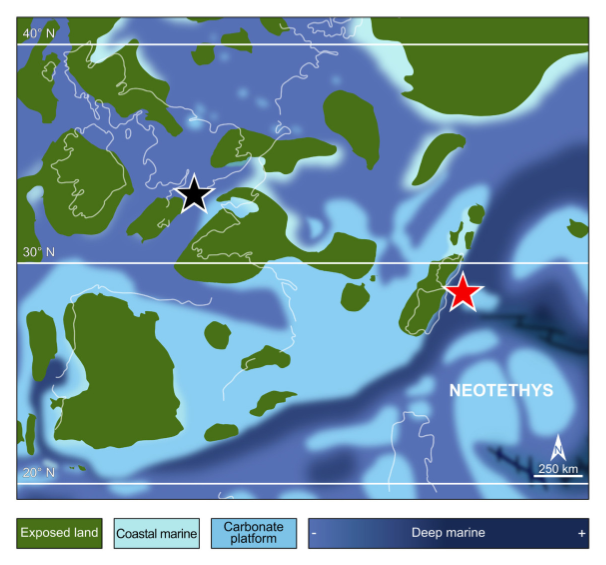
Paleogeography of the northwestern Neotethys showing the location of Osteno (red star)

During the late Hettangian to early Sinemurian, the western Lombardy Basin formed part of the Southern Alps area, passive margin of Adria and formed part of an evolving rift system linked to the western Tethys, where horst-and-graben tectonics created alternating shallow platforms and subsiding troughs. Structural highs such as Monte Campo dei Fiori, the Varese-Arbostora swell, and Monte Nudo defined the basin architecture, producing shallow carbonate platforms, emergent land, and subsiding depocenters. Nearby emerged areas are known at Briançonnais with the bauxite rich “Siderolitico” linked to long emersion phase (Ladinian-Bathonian) and Western Tauern with graphitic schists and quartzites & sandy marble, overall pointing to the Lombardian sector acting as a possible land bridge with Laurasia, connected with the Calcari Grigi di Noriglio Formation in the Trento carbonate Platform, based on Theropod tracks of similar size to Saltriovenator. The main inner land was the Malossa-Zandobbio palaeohigh system in the Po Plain, tied with the Saltrio area by a regional belt of positive blocks. This Highs, if assumed as a single unit probably got 1,000-3,000 km² for the inner lands and 22,500 km² in total of intermittently exposed terrain (similar in size to modern Sicily). Indicators of subaerial conditions are seen at Castello Cabiaglio-Orino, thick "terra rossa" paleosols developed directly above the Rhaetian Zu Limestone, showing rhizoliths, alveolar structures, and meteoric diagenesis. Palynological assemblages from these horizons indicate Hirmeriellaceae-dominated forests and understory of Lycopsid-Ferns, as well potential Characeae, adapted to marsh or ponded settings in a Tropical subhumid climate. These emerged lands bordered a gulf-shaped embayment, open northward, where shallow-marine carbonate platforms alternated with rapidly subsiding basins. Towards the Early Sinemurian the Arbostora swell submerged into a shallow open sea (ramp-slope), still bordered south and southwest by emerged land supported by terrigenous sands from eroded igneous/metamorphic rocks and terrestrial plants in the limestones.

Within the Moltrasio Formation, the shallowest deposits belong to the "Alpe Perino Limestone" ("Gozzano-type" marginal onlap), a small carbonate platform developed on structural highs and fault-bounded grabens. Its basal beds of Ostracod-rich mudstones and marls, with reworked Triassic lithoclasts and local plant remains (Castello Cabiaglio–Orino section), reflect restricted lagoons or marsh-like ponds on the inner platform. Then the facies evolve in repeated shallowing-upward cycles with stromatolitic-rich tidal flats and fossil-rich (gastropods, bivalves, echinoids, Dasycladales, and Foraminifera) shoals, marking a dominance of shallow subtidal to intertidal settings in the Monte Nudo basin margin, with limited terrigenous input but clear evidence of proximity to land. This unit is either part of the "Late Hettangian hypothesis" (shallower section being flooded by the Saltrio Beds) or is part the "Early Sinemurian hypothesis" (overlap with earliest Saltrio Beds on tectonic blocks and be diachronous shallow-platform vs. outer-ramp).

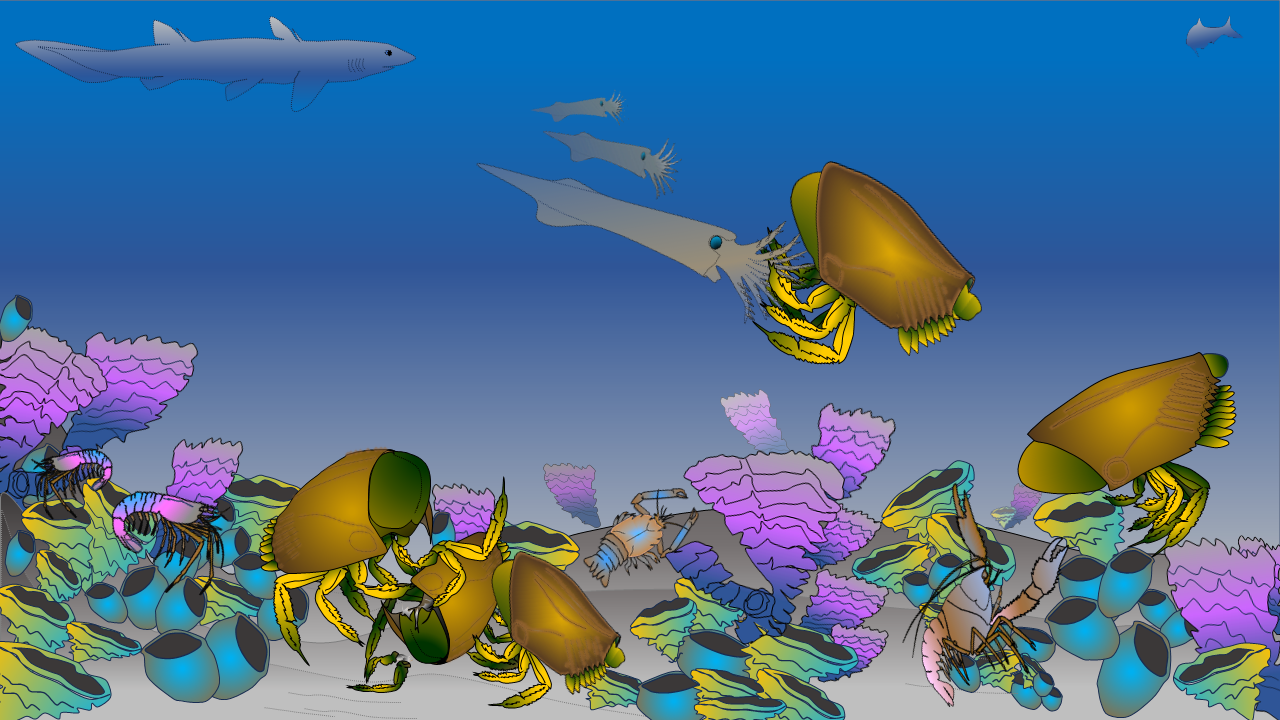
Artistic reconstruction of a hypothetical scene related to the Osteno Lagerstätte.

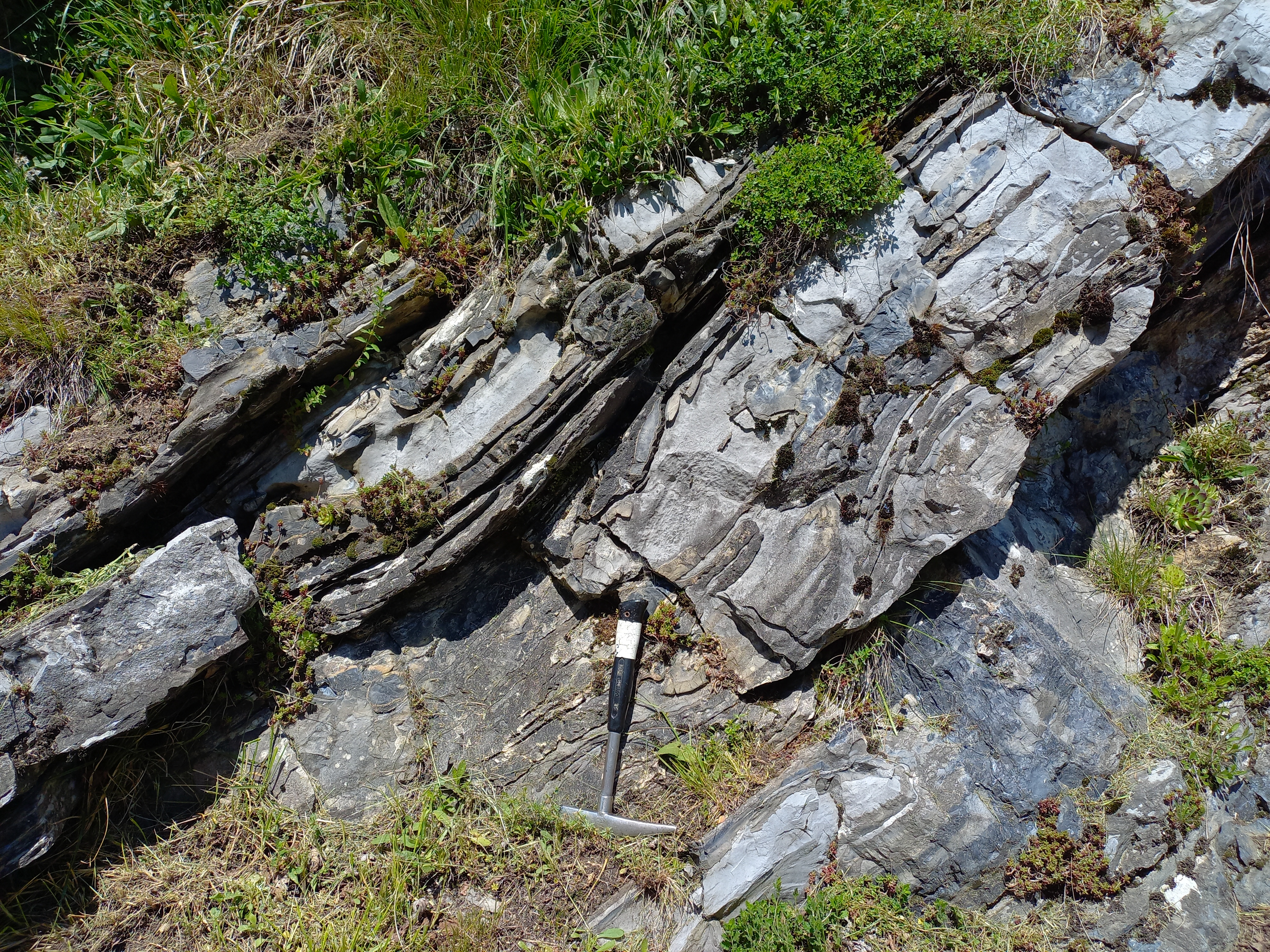
Exposed Moltrasio Fm at Monte Cornizzolo

Early marine flooding in fault-bounded grabens produced the “Viggiù-type” facies, consisting of cross-bedded coarse epiclastic calcarenites-rudites, rich in rounded ooids, algal-encrusted bioclasts, dolomitic pelites, and lithoclasts derived from exposed Triassic platforms (Hauptdolomit), later mixed with echinoderm debris. These record short-transport input from adjacent structural highs during the first phase of transgression.

On neighboring highs, pale crinoidal packstones-grainstones (“Saltrio-type”) formed as autochthonous crinoid meadows, with encrusting sponge reefs, bivalvia, brachiopods, bryozoans, and foraminiferans. Fragmentary Ichthyosaur remains and bioeroded dinosaur bones (e.g., Saltriovenator zanellai) suggest transport from nearby terrestrial sources into a proximal slope or ramp, that is, an open subtidal zone some dozen of meters depth reached by the effects of storm waves and with constant bottom currents. Pauses in sedimentation generated bored hardgrounds coated with glauconite and phosphatic crusts, indicating slow accumulation under open-marine conditions.

In intervening lows, condensed horizons (“Poaggia-type”) developed on firmgrounds, hosting abundant ammonites and other pelagic organisms, overlain by thin encrinitic calcarenites and laminated spiculitic micrites that contain resedimented crinoid grains, sponge spicules, fish-phosphate, and fine terrigenous silt, reflecting hemipelagic deposition and early slope development. At the platform margins, such as Gozzano and Monte Fenera, reddish calcarenites and litharenites with basement-derived quartz and rhyolite mark true transgressive onlap onto exposed highs. These later give way to sponge-dominated carbonate mounds (locally “Broccatello-type”), reflecting a benthic, sponge-reef-dominated carbonate factory in deeper, low-light environments during progressive platform drowning.

Regional studies link this to platform drowning amid rifting, with carbon-isotope excursions implying volcanic influences and ocean perturbations. A modern analogue is the Bahama Banks, featuring oolitic shoals and lagoons in a subtropical passive-margin setting.

=== Osteno Lagerstätte ===
Apart from the Eocene of Monte Bolca, the Sinemurian of Osteno is the only fossil deposit in Italy in which soft bodies are preserved. The Osteno site was discovered in 1964. It was recovered from a series of 6 metres (20 ft) package of fine laminated, gray, spongiolitic, micritic limestone. Coroniceras bisulcatum allowed to date the outcrop as the Bucklandi zone, lower Sinemurian. The outcrop is a good documentation of a particularly complete fauna and flora of the Lower Jurassic which is not exactly common in the Southern Alps. The Osteno outcrop, part of the formation, is worldwide known due to the exceptional preservation of mostly marine biota, including rare fossilized components, helping to understand the ecosystems of the local Sinemurian margin of the Monte Generoso Basin. The high local variety of fossils found is most likely due to unique conditions of preservation, where phosphatized soft tissues have not been observed in any fish or polychaetes, but they are common in crustaceans (33%) and also occur in a smaller percentage of teuthids (14%). Soft part preservation through phosphatization in this deposit includes the muscles and branchia of Crustaceans, fish tissues, and the digestive tracts of coleoids, polychaetes, and nematodes. These fossils are interpreted as having been preserved in a stagnant, restricted basin with anoxic conditions likely within the sediment pore waters.

== Biota ==
=== Foranimifera ===
Taxa	Species	Locality	Material	Notes	Images
Ammobaculites	A. sp.	Castello Cabiaglio-Orino; M. Sasso del Ferro	Tests	Simple agglutinated Ammomarginulininae benthic foraminifera	
Involutina	I. cf. liassica	Castello Cabiaglio-Orino	Tests	Early Jurassic Involutinidae, typical of outer-platform wackestones	
Lenticulina	L. sp.	Widespread in Alpe Perino & Moltrasio-Saltrio facies	Tests	Hyaline benthic foraminifera of Nodosariidae; typical in open-subtidal facies	
Reophax	R. sp.	Alpe Perino	Tests	Simple agglutinated benthic foraminifera of Reophacidae	
Siphovalvulina	S. sp.	Alpe Perino	Tests	Shallow-subtidal benthic foraminifera of Siphovalvulinidae	
Vidalina	V. martana	Alpe Perino; Moltrasio-Saltrio facies	Tests	Early Jurassic benthic foraminifera of Involutinidae-like affinity; common on Liassic platforms	

=== Porifera ===
Genus	Species	Locality	Material	Notes	Images
Corynella	C. spp.	Broccatello of Arzo	Spicules & Imprints	A Calcareous sponge of the family Endostomatidae.	
Endostoma	E. spp.	Broccatello of Arzo	Spicules & Imprints	A Calcareous sponge of the family Endostomatidae.	
Stellispongia	S. spp.	Broccatello of Arzo	Spicules & Imprints	A Calcareous sponge of the family Stellispongiidae.	
Neuropora	N. cf. undulata; N. spp.	Cava Salnova quarry; Galli Quarry	Spicules & Imprints	A Demosponge of the family Neuroporidae. A notorious reef developing genus	

=== Brachiopoda ===
Genus	Species	Locality	Material	Notes	Images
Arzonellina	A. exotica	Broccatello of Arzo	Shells	A Terebratulidan of the family Arzonellinidae.	
Aulacothyris	A. waterhousi	Broccatello of Arzo	Shells	A Terebratulidan of the family Zeilleriidae.	Aulacothyris
Cirpa	C. fronto; C. briseis; C. variabilis	Broccatello of Arzo; Cava Salnova quarry	Shells	A Rhynchonellidan of the family Wellerellidae. Identified originally as "Rhynchonella variabilis".	
Furcirhynchia	F. cf. melvillei	Broccatello of Arzo	Shells	A Rhynchonellidan of the family Rhynchonellidae.	
Liospiriferina	L. rostrata	Broccatello of Arzo; Cava Salnova quarry	Shells	A Rhynchonellidan of the family Spiriferinidae. Was identified originally as "Spiriferina haasi".	Liospiriferina specimens
Lobothyris	L. punctata; L. andleri; L. subpunctata; L. ovatissinia; L. sp.	Broccatello of Arzo; Cava Salnova quarry; Galli Quarry	Shells	A Terebratulidan of the family Lobothyrididae. Was identified originally as "Terebratula punctata".	Lobothyris
Prionorhynchia	P. belemnitica; P. greppini; P. flabellum; P. ssp.	Broccatello of Arzo	Shells	A Rhynchonellidan of the family Prionorhynchiidae.	
Rimirhynchia	R. aff. anglica	Broccatello of Arzo	Shells	A Rhynchonellidan of the family Rhynchonellidae.	
Rhynchonella	R. acanthica; R. binodosa; R. belemnitica; R. latifrons; R. rimata; R. cf.polyptycha	Broccatello of Arzo; Cava Salnova quarry; Galli Quarry	Shells	A Rhynchonellidan of the family Wellerellidae.	Rhynchonella
Rhynchonellina	R. alpina; R. ssp.	Broccatello of Arzo	Shells	A Rhynchonellidan of the family Dimerellidae.	
Tetrarhynchia	T. spp.	Broccatello of Arzo	Shells	A Rhynchonellidan of the family Tetrarhynchiidae.	
Terebratula	T. scissa; T. rhomboedrica; T. prumus	Cava Salnova quarry; Galli Quarry	Shells	A Terebratulidan of the family Terebratulidae.	
Spiriferina	S. expansa; S. hartmanni; S. oxigona; S. walcotti; S. rupestris; S. rostrata; S. haasi; S. tumida; S. cf. spirigeroides	Broccatello of Arzo; Cava Salnova quarry	Shells	A Rhynchonellidan of the family Spiriferinidae.	Spiriferina
Sulcirostra	S. alpina	Broccatello of Arzo	Shells	A Rhynchonellidan of the family Dimerellidae.	
Viallithyris	V. gozzanensis; V. adnetensis	Broccatello of Arzo; Cava Salnova quarry	Shells	A Rhynchonellidan of the family Rhynchonellidae.	
Zeilleria	Z. sarthacensis; Z. choffati; Z. cor; Z. ewaldi; Z. stapia; Z. cornuta; Z. subnumismalis; Z. (Zeilleria) indentata	Broccatello of Arzo; Cava Salnova quarry; Galli Quarry	Shells	A Terebratulidan of the family Zeilleriidae.	Zeilleria

=== Bryozoa ===
Genus	Species	Locality	Material	Notes	Images
Ceriopora	C.? cf. orbignyi	Cava Salnova quarry; Galli Quarry	Imprints	A Cyclostomatidan of the family Cerioporidae.	

=== Nematoida ===
Genus	Species	Location	Material	Notes	Images
Eophasma	E. jurasicum	Osteno	Six specimens with soft parts	A nematode, type member of the family Eophasmidae. A rare find, since nematode fossils are absent in most Mesozoic marine rocks.	Eophasma

=== Annelida ===
Genus	Species	Location	Material	Notes	Images
Melanoraphia	M. maculata	Osteno	Eleven specimens, complete with soft parts	A polychaete, member of the group Phyllodocemorpha with incertae sedis assignation, suggested to be a member of Lumbrineridae.	Melanoraphia
Terebella	T. lapilloides; T. spp.	Broccatello of Arzo; Cava Salnova quarry	Tubiform structures	A terebellid, member of the family Terebellidae	Terebella specimen

=== Arthropoda ===
Genus	Species	Location	Material	Notes	Images
Aeger	A. foesteri; A. muensteri; A. robustus; A. rostrospinatus; A. elongatus; A. macropus	Osteno	Multiple specimens fairly preserved	A decapod of the family Aegeridae. This genus is the most abundant local crustacean, and was a shrimp-like creature that was probably necrophagous.	Aeger foersteri
Angarestia	A. tricarinata	Osteno	137 complete and fragmentary specimens	A decapod of the family Erymidae.	
Ankitokazocaris?	A.? sp.	Osteno	MSNM I28252	A thylacocephalan.	
Austriocaris?	A.? sp.	Osteno	MSNM I10074	A thylacocephalan of the family Austriocarididae.	
Coleia	C. vialiii; C. medilerranea; C. cf. antiqua; C. pinnnai	Osteno	Multiple specimens fairly preserved	A decapod of the family Coleiidae. Probably a bottom dweller predatory crustacean.	Coleia viallii
Eryma	E. sinemuriana	Osteno	41 specimens, fairly preserved	A decapod of the family Erymidae. The species was originally identified as Pustulina sinemuriana.	
Mecochirus	M. germari	Osteno	81 complete and fragmentary specimens,	A decapod of the family Mecochiridae.	Mecochirus germari
Ostenocaris	O. cypriformis	Osteno	Multiple specimens, complete and incomplete	A thylacocephalan of the family Ostenocarididae. It is the most common fossil of the formation, and the main identified thylacocephalan from the formation.	Ostenocaris
Ostenolimulus	O. latus	Osteno	A nearly complete specimen	A horseshoe crab of the family Limulidae. This genus represents the oldest Jurassic limulid and only the second xiphosuran known from Italy. Also indicates that this family were a diverse and widespread clade during the Jurassic.	
Ostenosculda	O. teruzzii	Osteno	Single Specimen fairly preserved	An early unipeltatan mantis shrimp	
Palaeastacus	P. meyeri	Osteno	Multiple specimens fairly preserved	A decapod of the family Erymidae. The species was originally included in the genus Eryma as E. meyeri, although the specimens reveal morphological characters diagnostic of Palaeastacus.	
Paraostenia?	P.? sp.	Osteno	MSNM I29344	A thylacocephalan.	
Phlyctisoma	P. sinemuriana	Osteno	10 specimens, in a fairly good state of preservation	A decapod of the family Erymidae. The species was originally identified as Pustulina sinemuriana.	
Pseudoglyphea	P. ancylochelis	Osteno	7 complete specimens, in a fairly good state	A decapod of the family Litogastroidae. Probably a bottom dweller predatory crustacean.	
Teruzzicheles	T. popeyei	Osteno	Various specimens fairly preserved	A decapod of the family Polychelidae	

=== Mollusks ===
Genus	Species	Locality	Material	Notes	Images
Agassiceras	A. nodosaries; A. aff. scipionianum	Cava Salnova quarry	Shells	An Ammonitidan of the family Arietitidae.	
Angulaticeras	A. sp.	Osteno	Shells	An ammonitidan of the family Schlotheimiidae.	
Anticonulus	A. profunde-umbilicatus	Cava Salnova quarry; Galli Quarry	Shells	A Snail of the family Trochidae.	
Arietites	A. bucklandi; A. raricostatus; A. rapidecrescens; A. ceratitoides; A. kridioides; A. dimorphus; A. arnoui; A. conybeari; A. sauzeanus	Cava Salnova quarry; Osteno	Shells	An Ammonitidan of the family Arietitidae.	Arietites bucklandi
Arnioceras	A. cf. bodleyi	Cava Salnova quarry; Galli Quarry	Shells	An Ammonitidan of the family Arietitidae.	
Astarte	A. praeobliqua	Cava Salnova quarry	Shells	A Clam of the family Astartidae. Some shells identified as Cardium probably belong to this genus.	Astarte
Asteroceras	A. obtusum; A. stellare; A. retusum; A. confusum	Cava Salnova quarry; Burgioli quarry; Galli quarry	Shells	An Ammonitidan of the family Arietitidae.	Asteroceras
Aulacoceras	A. ("Ausseites") italicus	Cava Salnova quarry; Galli Quarry	Phagmocones	A Belemnite of the family Aulacoceratidae.	
Avicula	A. sinemuriensis; A. (Oxytoma) dumortieri	Cava Salnova quarry; Galli Quarry	Shells	A Pearl Oyster of the family Pteriidae.	
Bathrotomaria	B. cf. trocheata	Cava Salnova quarry; Galli Quarry	Shells	A Snail of the family Pleurotomariidae.	
Calvaentolium	C. hehlii	Cava Salnova quarry	Shells	A Scallop of the family Pectinoidae. It was identified originally as "Pecten (Pseudamusium) hehlii".	
Cardinia	C. hybrida; C. similis; C. rugosa; C. hybrida; C. concinna; C. depressa; C. spp.	Cava Salnova quarry; Galli Quarry	Shells	A Clam of the family Cardiniidae.	
Cardium	C.? italicum; C. cf. multicostatum; C. spp.	Cava Salnova quarry	Shells	A Clam of the family Cardiniidae.	
Cenoceras	C. amorettii; C. stoppanii; C. intermedium; C. arare; C. spreaficoi; C. breislacki; C. striatum; C. sturi; C. balsamocrivellii; C. affinis; C. brancoi; C. ornatus	Cava Salnova quarry; Galli Quarry	Shells	A Nautilidan of the family Cenoceratidae. Cenoceras was identified as member of the genus Nautilus originally.	Cenoceras reconstruction
Coroniceras	C. cf.gmuendense; C. rotiformis; C. bucklandi; C. orbiculatus; C. bisulcatus	Cava Salnova quarry; Osteno	Shells	An Ammonitidan of the family Arietitidae.	Coroniceras specimen
Crucilobiceras	C. cf. tardarmatum	Galli Quarry	Shells	An Ammonitidan of the family Eoderoceratidae.	
Ectocentrites	E. sp.	Osteno	Shells	An ammonitidan of the family Lytoceratidae.	
Entolium	E. hehli; E. calvum; E. disciforme	Cava Salnova quarry; Galli Quarry	Shells	A Scallop of the family Pectinoidae.	
Eparietites	E. impendens	Cava Salnova quarry; Burgioli quarry; Galli Quarry	Shells	An Ammonitidan of the family Arietitidae	
Euasteroceras	E. cf.turneri	Cava Salnova quarry; Galli Quarry	Shells	An Ammonitidan of the family Arietitidae	
Chlamys	C. textoria	Cava Salnova quarry; Galli Quarry	Shells	A Scallop of the family Pectinoidae It was identified as "Pecten (Chlamys) textorius".	Chlamys
Coelostylina	C. lepontina	Cava Salnova quarry; Galli Quarry	Shells	A Snail of the family Coelostylinidae.	
Discohelix	D. sp.	Broccatello of Arzo	Shells	A Snail of the family Discohelicidae.	Discohelix
Discotoma	D.? aff. ornata	Cava Salnova quarry	Shells	A Snail of the family Pleurotomariidae.	
Fimbria	F. semireticulata; F. (Sphaeriola) sp.	Cava Salnova quarry	Shells	A Clam of the family Lucinidae.	Fimbria
Gresslya	G. lunulata	Cava Salnova quarry; Galli Quarry	Shells	A Clam of the family Pleuromyidae.	
Goniomya	G. verbana	Cava Salnova quarry	Shells	A Clam of the family Lucinidae.	
Gryphaea	G. arcuata	Cava Salnova quarry	Shells	An Oyster of the family Gryphaeidae.	Fimbria
Lima	L. (Radula) succincta; L. (Radula) valmariannae; L. (Radula) hettangiensis; L. spp.	Broccatello of Arzo; Cava Salnova quarry	Shells	A File Clam of the family Limidae.	Lima
Lucina	L. ? liasina	Cava Salnova quarry	Shells	A Clam of the family Lucinidae.	Lucina
Lytoceras	L. sp.	Galli Quarry	Shells	An Ammonitidan of the family Lytoceratidae	
Mactromya	M. arenacea; M. cingulata; M. problematica	Cava Salnova quarry; Galli Quarry	Shells	An Adapedont of the family Edmondiidae.	
Microderoceras	M. birchii	Cava Salnova quarry	Shells	An Ammonitidan of the family Eoderoceratidae.	Microderoceras specimen
Modiolus	M. vomer; M. cf.scalpra	Cava Salnova quarry; Galli Quarry	Shells	A Mussel of the family Mytilidae. Identified as the genus "Modiola", now junior synonym of Modiolus.	Modiolus
Myoconcha	M. scabra; M. rugosa; M. ssp.	Cava Salnova quarry; Galli Quarry	Shells	A Clam of the family Pleuromyidae.	
Nannobelus	N. cf. acutus	Cava Salnova quarry; Galli Quarry	Phagmocones	A Belemnite of the family Belemnitidae.	
Ostenoteuthis	O. siroi	Osteno	Several specimens with decent preservation	A coleoid of the family Ostenoteuthidae. A unique group of coeloids, only found at this location.	Ostenoteuthis
Ostrea	O. cf. chillyensis; O. electra	Broccatello of Arzo; Cava Salnova quarry	Shells	An Oyster of the family Ostreidae.	Ostrea
Oxynoticeras	O. oxynotum; O. actinotum	Cava Salnova quarry; Burgioli quarry; Galli Quarry; Osteno Outcrop	Shells	An Ammonitidan of the family Oxynoticeratidae.	Oxynoticeras specimen
Paltechioceras	P. (Plesechioceras) demissum; P.(Plesechioceras) delicatum	Burgioli quarry	Shells	An Ammonitidan of the family Echioceratidae.	
Paracoroniceras	P. cf. gmuendense	Cava Salnova quarry	Shells	An Ammonitidan of the family Arietitidae.	
Paradasyceras	P. stella	Cava Salnova quarry; Galli Quarry	Shells	An Ammonitidan of the family Juraphyllitidae.	
Parallelodon	P. (Grammatodon) cypriniforme	Cava Salnova quarry; Galli Quarry	Shells	A Clam of the family Parallelodontidae.	
Pecten	P. (Pseudamusium) diblasii; P. (Pseudamusium) hehlii; P. (Chlamys) subalpinus; P. (Chlamys) textorius; P. spp.	Broccatello of Arzo; Cava Salnova quarry	Shells	A Scallop of the family Pectinoidae.	Pecten
Pholadomya	P. sp.	Cava Salnova quarry	Shells	A Clam of the family Pholadomyidae.	Pholadomya
Plagiostoma	P. giganteum; P. stabilei; P. spp.	Broccatello of Arzo; Cava Salnova quarry	Shells	A File Clam of the family Limidae. Identified originally as "Lima (Plagiostoma) gigantea".	Plagiostoma
Pleuromya	P. cf. angusta; P. saltriensis; P. galathea	Cava Salnova quarry; Galli Quarry	Shells	A Clam of the family Pleuromyidae.	
Pleurotomaria	P. oblita; P. anglica; P. escheri; P. granulatocincta; P. hettangiensis; P. saltriensis; P. cf. gigas; P. sp.	Broccatello of Arzo; Cava Salnova quarry	Shells	A Snail of the family Pleurotomariidae.	Pleurotomaria
Promicroceras	P. planicosta	Burgioli quarry	Shells	An Ammonitidan of the family Eoderoceratidae.	
Ptychomphalus	P. expansus	Cava Salnova quarry	Shells	A Snail of the family Eotomariidae.	
Pyrgotrochus	P. basilicus; P. cf.basilicus	Cava Salnova quarry; Galli Quarry	Shells	A Snail of the family Pleurotomariidae.	
Schlotheimia	S.(Charmasseiceras?) sp.	Galli Quarry	Shells	An Ammonitidan of the family Schlotheimiidae	
Terquemia	T. heberti	Cava Salnova quarry	Shells	A Clam of the family Prospondylidea.	
Trochus	T. sp	Broccatello of Arzo; Cava Salnova quarry	Shells	A Snail of the family Trochidae.	Trochus
Trochotoma	T. subturrita	Cava Salnova quarry	Shells	A Snail of the family Pleurotomariidae.	
Uncinoteuthis	U. cuvieri	Osteno	An incomplete specimen consisting of the arm crown only	A coleoid of the family Ostenoteuthidae.	Uncinoteuthis
Vermiceras	V. spiratissimum; V. cf.spiratissimum	Cava Salnova quarry	Shells	An Ammonitidan of the family Arietitidae.	Vermiceras specimen

=== Echinoderms ===
Genus	Species	Location	Material	Notes	Images
Hispidocrinus	H. scalaris	Pradalunga	Multiple ossicles	A Crinoidean, member of the family Isocrininae inside Isocrinida.	
Isocrinus	I. tuberculatus; I. spp.	Broccatello of Arzo; Cava Salnova quarry; M. Campo dei Fiori; Ubiale-Clanezzo	Multiple ossicles	A Crinoidean, member of the family Isocrininae inside Isocrinida.	
Millericrinus	M. cf. adneticus	M. di Grone	Multiple ossicles	A Crinoidean, member of the family Millericrinidae inside Millericrinida.	
Miocidaris	M. amalthei	Cava Salnova quarry	Spines & Ambulacrum	An Echinoidean of the family Miocidaridae.	
Palaeocoma	P. milleri	Mount Campo dei Fiori; Ubiale-Clanezzo	MSNVI 044/017, dorsally-ventrally oriented ophiuroid	An Ophiuridan of the family Ophiodermatidae. Extant tropical species like Ophioderma are benthic predators and scavengers that show the same short spines seen in Palaeocoma.	Palaeocoma milleri
Pentacrinites	P. fasciculosus; P. tuberculosus; P. subangularis; P. spp.	Broccatello of Arzo; Cava Salnova quarry	Multiple ossicles	A Sea lily of the family Pentacrinitidae.	Pentacrinites
Plegiocidaris	P. falsani	Cava Salnova quarry; Galli Quarry	Spines & Ambulacrum	An Echinoidean of the family Cidaridae.	Plegiocidaris

=== Hemichordata ===
Genus	Species	Location	Material	Notes	Images
Megaderaion	M. sinemuriense	Osteno	Six specimens with soft parts	An acorn worm, member of the family Harrimaniidae inside Enteropneusta. This genus was probably benthic, linked with burrowing systems.	Modern relative, Saccoglossus

=== Chondrichthyes ===
Genus	Species	Location	Material	Notes	Images
Hybodontiformes indet.	Indeterminate	Osteno	Teeth	A shark, member of the family Hybodontiformes.	
Myriacanthidae gen nov.	sp. nov	Osteno	Virtually complete skull with associated parts of the branchial skeleton	A chimaerid, member of the family Myriacanthidae inside Chimaeriformes.	
Notidanoides	N. arzoensis	Broccatello of Arzo; Cava Salnova quarry	Teeth	A Crassodontidanidae Hexanchiform	
Ostenoselache	O. stenosoma	Osteno	One complete articulated specimen	A euselachiian of the family Ostenoselachidae. A genus only found in the Osteno Formation. With an elongated eel-shaped morphology, the specimens found measure at least 240 mm in length, with a neurocranium with a long, complex rostrum. It has been suggested it was an animal able to produce electric shocks, probably to kill prey.	Ostenoselache
Palaeospinax	P. pinnai	Osteno	A single specimen in four contiguous pieces and including parts of the dentition and squamation	A shark of the family Palaeospinacidae.	
Squaloraja	S. sp.	Osteno	One complete articulated specimen	A chimaerid of the family Squalorajidae. This genus belongs to a lineage of ray-like chimaeras.	Squaloraja
Sphenodus	S. helveticus; S. cf. alpinus; S. stschurowskii	Broccatello of Arzo; Cava Salnova quarry	Teeth	An Orthacodontidae Synechodontiform	

=== Actinopterygii ===
Genus	Species	Location	Material	Notes	Images
Dapedium	D. sp.	Osteno	MSNM V620 -MSNM V630, caudal fin with associated scales	Holostei of the family Dapediidae.	Dapedium
Dorsetichthys	D. bechei	Osteno	MSNM V409-MSNM V638: nearly complete articulated skeleton; MSNM V547-575: patch of articulated scales; MSNM V558: two isolated head skeletons; MSNM V572: poorly preserved head skeleton; MSNM V573: isolated caudal and caudal peduncle; MSNM V595: incomplete head skeleton; MSNM V604: patch of articulated scales; MSNM V629: nearly complete articulated skeleton; MSNM V633: incomplete articulated skeleton; MSNM V650: isolated head skeleton, in part and counterpart; MSNM V654: patch of articulated scales. MSNM V658: largely incomplete articulated skeleton; MSNM V662: partially complete articulated skeleton; MSNM V664: nearly complete articulated skeleton.	A member of the family Dorsetichthyidae. It is the main fish recovered on the formation.	Dorsetichthys
Furo	F. ("Eugnathus") sp.	Osteno	MSNM V623, an incomplete articulated skeleton; MSNM V634, an incomplete partially articulated skeleton.	A member of the family Furidae.	Furo
Ostenolepis	O. marianii	Osteno	MSNM V617, an almost complete, articulated skeleton; MSNM V538, largely incomplete specimen; MSNM V554, incomplete articulated skeleton; MSNM V652, incomplete twisted articulated skeleton; MSNM V618-19, skull & toracic section specimen. Other 3 Specimens	A member of the family Palaeoniscimorpha. Previously referred to Cosmolepis and Pteroniscus.	Ostenolepis
Peripeltopleurus	P. jurassicus	Osteno	MSNM V659, almost complete specimen lacking the tail	A member of the family Wushaichthyidae. Represents the only known Jurassic survivor of the order Peltopleuriformes	P. jurassicus
Pholidolepis	P. teruzzii	Osteno	MSNM V564-V621: almost complete, articulated skeleton. MSNM V529, MSNM V562, MSNM V533, MSNM V565, MSNM V596, MSNM V645, MSNM V648, MSNM V581, MSNM V649: isolated caudals; MSNM V540: incomplete articulated skeleton; MSNM V556, MSNM V559, MSNM V567, MSNM V568, MSNM V579, MSNM V594: isolated head skeleton; MSNM V563: disarticulated and largely incomplete skeleton; MSNM V570: incomplete articulated skeleton; MSNM V613: almost com-plete articulated skeleton; MSNM V625: incomplete articulated skeleton; MSNM V641: complete, articulated skeleton; MSNM V646: incomplete articulated skeleton MSNM V656: isolated pectoral girdle.	A member of the family Pholidophoridae.	P. teruzzii

=== Sarcopterygii ===
Genus	Species	Location	Material	Notes	Images
Holophagus	H. cf. gulo	Osteno	MSNM V530, V561, V587, V586, V588, V589, V591, V592, V593, V597, V598, V601, V599, V600, V667, V602, V607, V666, V668, isolated scales; MSNM V543, isolated urohyal.	A Coelacanth of the family Latimeriidae. Isolated 20 mm scales suggests a taxon up to 75 cm long.	Holophagus

=== Amniotes ===
In 2016 new vertebrate remains were discovered in the Salnova quarry, the remains are being studied to understand if it is a new dinosaur or some other creature. Latter has been confirmed to be Marine Diapsid material.

Genus	Species	Locality	Material	Notes	Images
Ichthyosauridae indet.	Indeterminate	Cava Salnova quarry	16 caudal vertebrae, two caudal ribs, one neural arch, and one limb bone	5–6 m in absolute length	
Ichthyosaurus	I. spp.	Galli Quarry	3 Vertebrae Imprints	A Neoichthyosaurian of the family Ichthyosauridae.	Ichthyosaurus
Pterosauria indet.	Indeterminate	Cava Salnova quarry	Isolated Tooth	Referred originally to "Pterodactylus longirostris"	Bergamodactylus, an older (Triassic) Pterosaur from Italy
Saltriovenator	S. zanellai	Cava Salnova quarry	MSNM V3664, very fragmentary and disarticulated skeleton; MSNM V3659, one maxillary or dentary tooth (Referred material)	A potential Ceratosaur. Traces on the bones show that the dinosaur carcass remained exposed to the water-sediment interface for months or years, long enough to first be defleshed by mobile scavengers, then colonized by a microbial community that spanned the bone–water interface, which in turn attracted slow-moving grazers and epibionts.	Saltriovenator holotype
Temnodontosaurus	T. cf.platyodon	Cava Salnova quarry	Isolated Tooth; Isolated Vertebrae	A Neoichthyosaurian of the family Temnodontosauridae. Specimen whose present repository is unknown.	Temnodontosaurus

=== Algae ===
Potential Dasycladaceae are seen on intertidal facies, while Characeae are seen at the base.

Taxa	Species	Locality	Material	Notes	Images
Cayeuxia	C. spp.	Alpe Perino; Castello Cabiaglio-Orino	Imprints	Calcareous green alga of Udoteaceae; typical of shallow subtidal facies	
Thaumatoporella	T. spp.	Alpe Perino Limestone	Imprints	Encrusting calcified alga, typical of Liassic shallow-marine platforms	

=== Plants ===
Genus	Species	Location	Material	Notes	Images
Brachyphyllum	B. saportum; B. "type A"; B. "type B"; B. "type C"; B. spp.	Osteno; Dintorni di Moltrasio	Branched Shoots	A coniferophytan of the family Cheirolepidiaceae.	
Callialasporites	C. spp.	Castello Cabiaglio-Orino	Pollen	Araucariaceae Conifer	Extant Araucaria.
Cerebropollenites	C. macroverrucosus	Castello Cabiaglio-Orino	Pollen	Sciadopityaceae Conifer	Extant Sciadopitys.
Classopollis	C. torosus	Castello Cabiaglio-Orino	Pollen	Cheirolepidiaceae Conifer, dominant palynomorph	
Clathropteris	C. platyphylla	Carate-Lario	Fronds	A Fern of the family Dipteridaceae	
Concavisporites	C. crassexinius	Castello Cabiaglio-Orino	Spores	Trilete spore of Lycophyte affinity	
Ctenopteris	C. grandis	Moltrasio	Fronds	A Fern of the family Polypodiaceae	
Equisitites	E. bunburyanus; E. sp.	Osteno	Stems	A Horsetail of the family Equisetaceae.	
Gliscopollis	C. meyeriana	Castello Cabiaglio-Orino	Pollen	Typical of Jurassic-Cretaceous Cheirolepidiaceae	
Granulatisporites	G. punctatus	Castello Cabiaglio-Orino	Spores	Trilete spore of Lycopodiales	
Lomatopteris	L. jurensis	Carate-Lario	Fronds	A "Seed Fern", affinities with Cyclopteridaceae.	Lomatopteris jurensis
Lycopodiacidites	L. rugulatus	Castello Cabiaglio-Orino	Spores	Trilete spore of Lycopodiaceae	Extant Lycopodium.
Microreticulatisporites	M. fuscus	Castello Cabiaglio-Orino	Spores	Trilete spore of probable Lycophyte origin	
Otozamites	O. bunburyanus; O. bechei; O. latior; O. brevifolius; O. pterophylloides; O. sp.	Osteno; Moltrasio; Carate-Lario	Leaflets	A spermatopsidan, member of Bennettitales.	
Pachypteris	P. cf. rhomboidalis; P. sp.	Osteno	Fronds	A "Seed Fern" of the family Corystospermaceae.	
Pagiophyllum	P. peregrinum; P. "type A"; P. "type B"; P. sp.	Osteno; Carate-Lario	Branched Shoots	A coniferophytan of the family Araucariaceae.	
Porcellispora	P. longdonensis	Castello Cabiaglio-Orino	Spores	Affinities with Bryophyta or Marchantiophyta, potentially Riellaceae.	
Thinnfeldia	T. rhomboidalis; T. obtusa	Carate-Lario	Fronds	A "Seed Fern" of the family Corystospermaceae.	
Uvaesporites	U. argenteaeformis	Castello Cabiaglio-Orino	Spores	Trilete spore of Selaginellaceae.	Extant Selaginella.
Williamsonia	W. sp.	Osteno	Reproductive Organ	A spermatopsidan, member of Bennettitales.	Williamsonia
Widdringtonites	W. baehmanni	Mombello	Branched Shoots	A coniferophytan of the family Araucariaceae.	
Zamites	Z. sp.	Osteno	Leaflets	A spermatopsidan, member of Bennettitales.	

== See also ==
- List of fossiliferous stratigraphic units in Italy
- Calcare di Sogno, Toarcian fossiliferous formation of Lombardy
- Rotzo Formation, Pliensbachian fossiliferous formation of Veneto
- Coimbra Formation, Sinemurian fossiliferous formation of Portugal
- Aganane Formation, Pliensbachian Formation of Morocco
