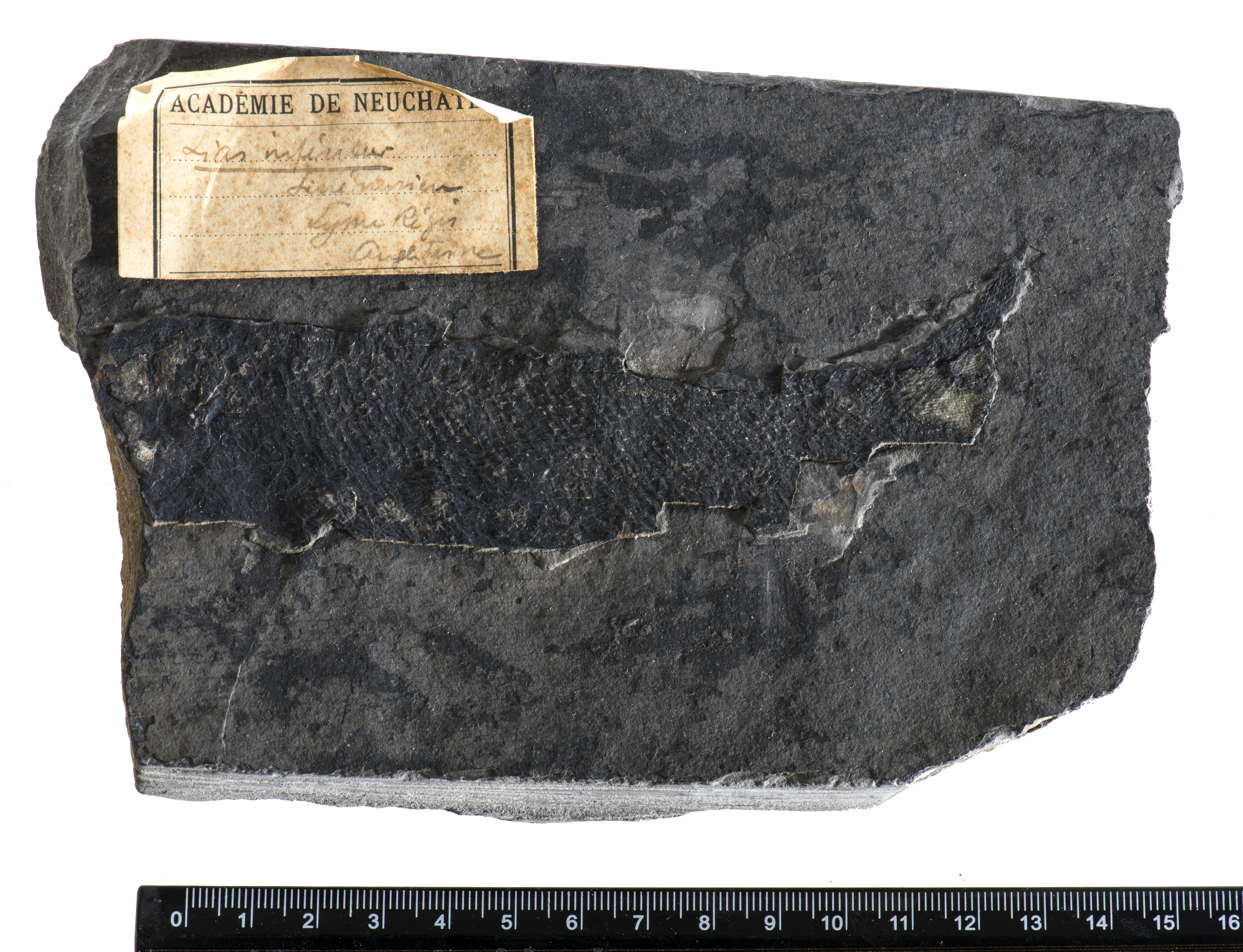

Scientific classification
- Kingdom: Animalia
- Phylum: Chordata
- Class: Actinopterygii
- Family: †Cosmolepididae; Gardiner, 1967
- Genus: †Cosmolepis; Egerton, 1855
- Species: †C. ornatus

Binomial name
- †Cosmolepis ornatus Egerton, 1858

Synonyms
- Oxygnathus Egerton, 1855 (non Oxygnathus Dejean, 1826); Thrissonotus Agassiz, 1842 (nomen nudum)

= Cosmolepis =

Cosmolepis Temporal range: Early Jurassic (Sinemurian)

Extinct genus of fishes

Cosmolepis is an extinct genus of prehistoric marine ray-finned fish that lived during the Early Jurassic epoch. It contains a single species, C. ornatus from the Blue Lias in what is now England. It is the only member of the family Cosmolepididae.

It was formerly placed in the Palaeonisciformes, a group of basal ray-finned fishes that is now considered to be paraphyletic. It is distinctive for its well-mineralized scales covered in ganoine. Its cheek and jaws have striated ridges of enamel.

Specimens from the Moltrasio Formation of Osteno, Italy have been placed in this species based on non-reliable morphological features common among many "palaeoniscoid" fish, and thus may not be representatives of this taxon. In 2026 they were placed in their own genus, Ostenolepis.

== See also ==
- Prehistoric fish
- List of prehistoric bony fish
