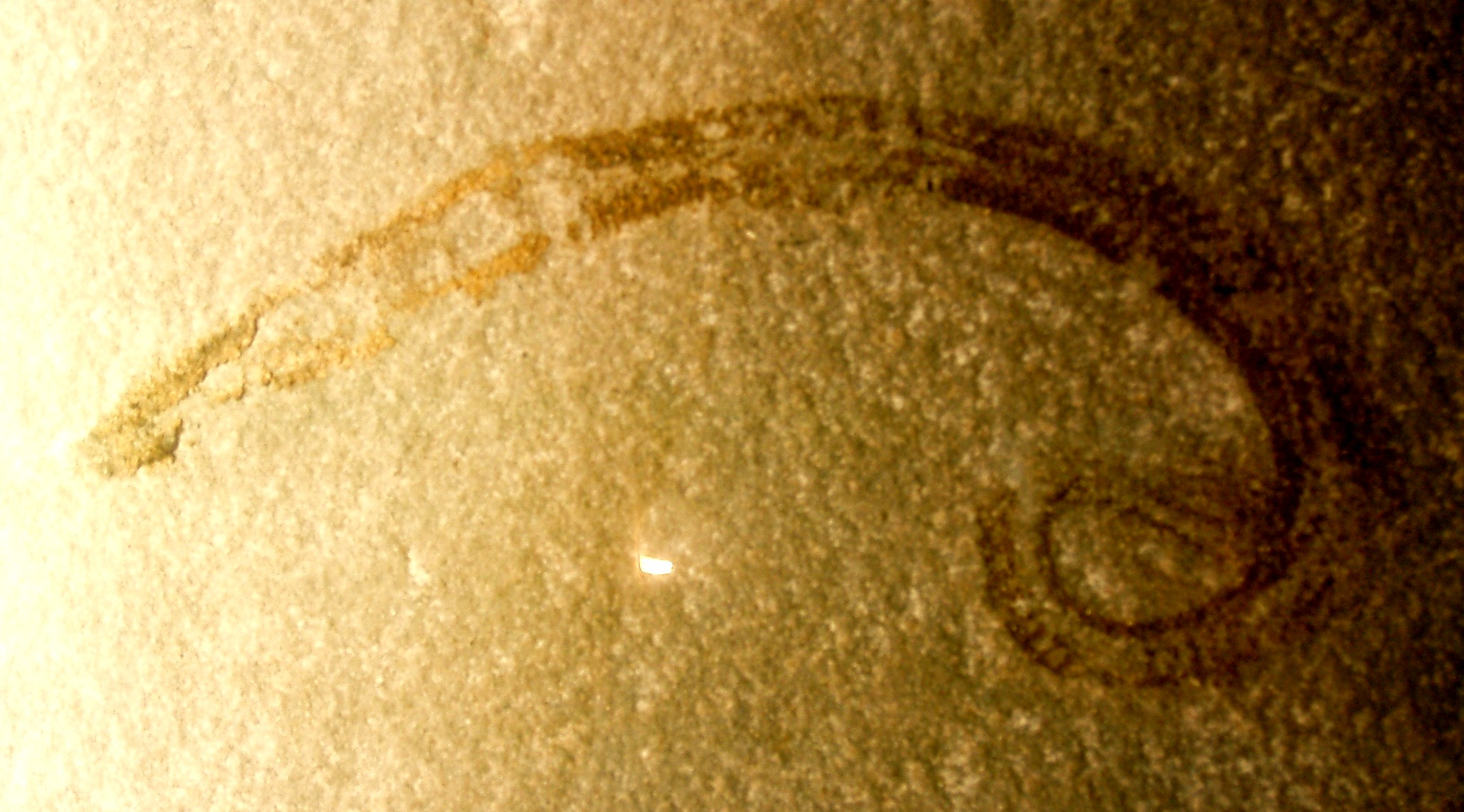
- Holotype

Scientific classification
- Kingdom: Animalia
- Phylum: Nematoda
- Class: Chromadorea
- Order: Desmoscolecida
- Suborder: Desmoscolecina
- Superfamily: Desmoscolecoidea
- Family: †Eophasmidae; Poinar, 2011
- Genus: †Eophasma; Arduini, Pinna & Teruzzi, 1983
- Species: †E. jurasicum

Binomial name
- †Eophasma jurasicum Arduini, Pinna & Teruzzi, 1983

= Eophasma =

Eophasma Temporal range: Sinemurian

Genus of roundworms

Eophasma is a genus of fossil nematodes from the Jurassic Moltrasio Formation of Osteno in Lombardy, Italy. It has only one species, Eophasma jurasicum.

In 2011, the genus was placed in the new family Eophasmidae Poinar, 2011, which is itself placed in the order Desmoscolecida, superfamily Desmoscolecoidea.
