= Saxoceras =

Saxoceras Temporal range: Hettangian

Scientific classification
- Kingdom: Animalia
- Phylum: Mollusca
- Class: Cephalopoda
- Subclass: †Ammonoidea
- Order: †Ammonitida
- Family: †Schlotheimiidae
- Genus: †Saxoceras; Lang, 1924

Species
- Saxoceras portlocki Wright, 1881

Genus of molluscs (fossil)

Saxoceras is a genus of very evolute schlotheimiid ammonoids from the Lower Jurassic.

The shell of Saxoceras is discoidal, bearing strong, generally straight ribs that arise on the umbilical shoulder and thicken in the middle of the venter. Similar Waehneroceras has ribs that curve forward as they approach the venter, and Kammerkarites has finer ribs with secondaries. Both are also evolute schlotheimiids with all whorls exposed. Epamminites of the Arietitidae is similar from the side but has a smooth band running along the venter with a median keel.

== Distribution ==
British Columbia, France and Alaska
