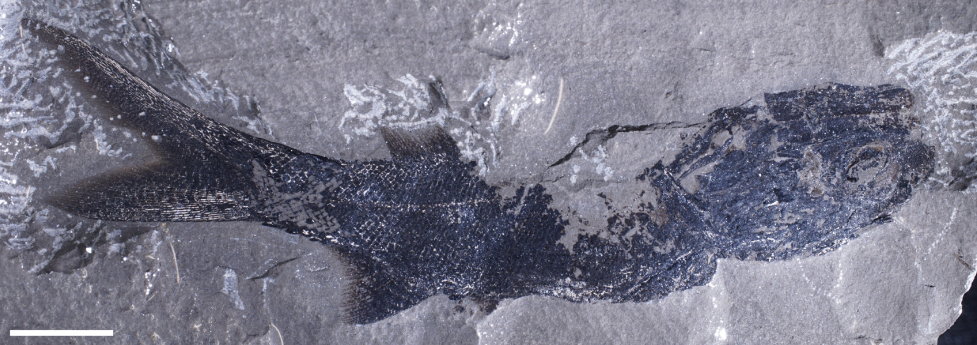
- An image of the holotype of Ostenolepis

Scientific classification
- Kingdom: Animalia
- Phylum: Chordata
- Class: Actinopterygii
- Order: †Palaeonisciformes
- Genus: †Ostenolepis; Franceschi et al., 2026

Type genus
- O. marianii Franceschi et al., 2026

= Ostenolepis =

Ostenolepis Temporal range: Early Jurassic Sinemurian 198.3 Ma

Extinct genus of fishes

Ostenolepis is an extinct genus of marine palaeoniscimorph ray-finned fish from the Early Jurassic Osteno Konservat-Lagerstatte of Italy. Ostenolepis is known from a total of four specimens which were first described in 1984, though referred to different genera. This was until the 2026, when the material was assigned to their current genus. The exact placement of the fish within palaeoniscimorphs is currently unknown though comparisons have been made with another Jurassic fish, Pteroniscus turkestanensis. Not much about the paleoenvironment is known but Ostenolepis most likely lived in the water column of a relatively deep basin within the northwestern Neotethys. Only one species is assigned to the genus: O. marianii.

== History and classification ==
The specimens eventually assigned to Ostenolepis were collected from the Osteno Konservat-Lagerstatte of the Moltrasio Formation in Northern Italy. This material had been referenced in the literature for the last four decades with the first reference coming from a 1984 paper by Schaeffer and Patterson who referred to the material as two separate taxa, being "cf. Cosmolepis" and "cf. Pteroniscus". Though this assignment would stay relatively stable, it would be referred to the family Coccolepididae by Duffin and Patterson along with Garassino and Teruzzi in 1993 and 2015 respectively. Ostenolepis was described by Fabio Franceschi and coauthors in 2026 based on the holotype (MSNM V617) along with three paratypes (MSNM V538, MSNM V554, and MSNM V652). The holotype is the most complete of the four specimens though it is still missing parts of some of the fins and the antero-dorsal region of the trunk.

The generic name of Ostenolepis in reference to the site where the specimens were found in combination with the suffix "lepis" which means "scale" in Ancient Greek. This is due to the distinct ganiod scales on the fish. The specific name "marianii" is in honor of Pio Mariani, the original discoverer of the Osteno Konservat-Lagerstatte in 1964.

=== Classification ===
The 2026 paper by Franceschi and coauthors placed Ostenolepis as a member of Palaeoniscimorpha though do not assign it to a more specific group due to a number of features largely relating to the dermal ornamentation of the fish. The fish that the authors suggest that Ostenolepis most closely resembles is Pteroniscus turkestanensis from the Middle-Upper Jurassic of Kazakhstan.

== Description ==
Ostenolepis is a small fish with the largest specimen assigned to the genus having an estimated total length of 130 millimetres (5.1 in). The skull of the fish is large with it making up about one third of the standard length.

=== Skull ===
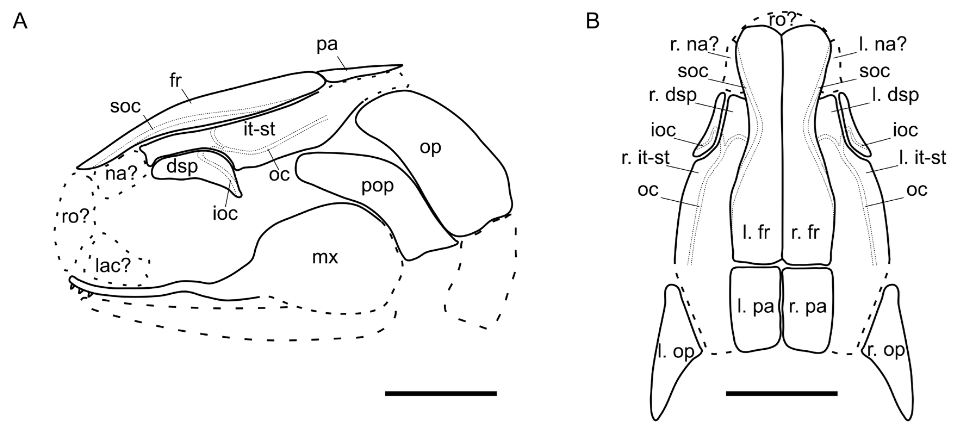
Lateral and dorsal views of the skull of Ostenolepis.

The skull of Ostenolepis is only known from the holotype, it is relatively poorly-preserved with a number of anatomical features of the skull being hard to make out. What is interpreted as the nasal bone is small and placed at the side of the skull. At the front of the bone, there is a small notch at the back with it most likely being the posterior nostril. Another bone, the triangular rostral is another more poorly preserved though seems to be larger than nasal and also has a notch which is most likely the anterior nostril. These bones, along with what is possibly the lacrimal, represent the anterior portion of the orbit. The only bone of the jaw preserved in the specimen is the maxilla. The exact shape of bone is questionable though it is interpreted as being very narrow for most of the length before broadening into a large plate near the preopercle. A total of four small, conical teeth are found at the anterior-most section of the jaw.

The front of the skull roof is made up of the frontals, also being the largest bones that make up the roof. They are long and narrow out towards the front, where they become almost semicircular in shape. This is in contrast to the back edge of the bone which is much flatter. These bones are constricted towards the center of their length due to the presence of the orbits. The frontals are in contact with the parietals and the intertemporo-supratemporal posteriorly and laterally respectively. The parietals are subquadrangular in shape with the lateral edges being convexly rounded. The intertemporo-supratemporal is much longer than the parietal and tapers towards the front where the orbit is placed. Another bone, the dermosphenotic, is in contact with the tapered section of the intertemporo-supratemporal. It is crescent-shaped and most likely made up a large amount of the upper wall of the orbit. Unlike the intertemporo-supratemporal, the dermosphenotic possesses a ganoine cover. There are four bone fragments inside of the orbit which may represent parts of the scleral ring.

Similar to the rest of the skull, the opercular region of the fish is relatively poorly preserved with the shape of the preopecule being hard to make out. Based on the placement, the bone would have articulated with the posterior plate of the maxilla. The opercule is almost rectangular in shape, being about twice as tall as it is wide. Growth lines can be seen on both it and the subopercle. A large unknown bone with four parallel ridges can also be found in this area.

=== Postcranium ===
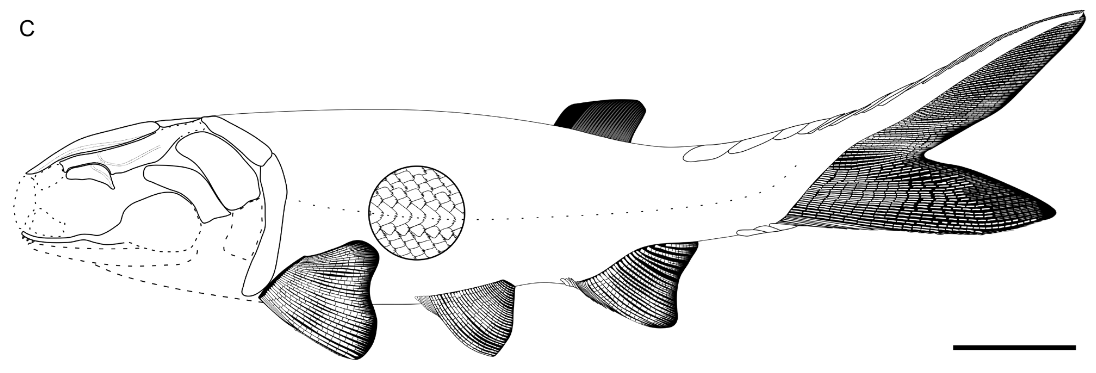
A full body reconstruction of Ostenolepis.

The body of Ostenolepis is fusiform in shape, it is not deep-bodied with the ratio of the total length and the maximum depth of the fish being 6.8. Similar to the skull, the pectoral girdle of the fish is poorly preserved. Only one sub-rectangular bone in the girdle is able to be identified in the holotype. The authors of the 2026 paper interpret this bone as the supracleithrum. A large cleithrum is able to be made out, being placed behind the supracleithrum. The pectoral fins are large and placed towards the bottom of the fish. These fins are very wide, being made up of at least twenty-nine fin rays. The first twenty rays are large and wide with the last nine being shorter and only half of the width. Even with this change in thickness, all fin rays in the pectorals possess fringing fulcra. The pelvic fins are placed near the midpoint of the body and are smaller than the pectoral fins. They are triangular and made up of thirty-eight rays with the first ten being procurrent. Similar to most of the rays in the pectoral fins, the rays of the pelvic fins are wide though only the first fin ray possesses fringing fulcra. Backwards-pointing, small spines are associated with some of the rays.

The dorsal fin is located between the pelvic and anal fins. The exact shape of the fin is unknown though it is made up of at least twenty-two rays. Even with this being the case, it is able to be seen that it would have been the shortest fin on the fish. The anal fin is about the same size as the pelvic fins and, like these other fins, is triangular. It is made up of twenty-nine fin rays with nine of these being procurrent and the others branch towards their ends. Also like the pelvic fins, only the first fin ray possesses fringing fulcra. There are also at least three basal fulcra placed in front of the anal fin. The largest fin of Ostenolepis is the caudal fin which is epicercal and inequilobate with both lobes being the same depth even though the upper lobe is much longer. These lobes meet at midline of the fish, with this point having a cleft in the fin. The fin is made up seventy-nine rays with fifty of these being from the upper lobe. They are shorter than those seen on the lower lobe. These longer rays on the lower lobe are split into nine procurrent rays and twenty principal rays. The rays that make up the bottom edge of the fin possess fringing fulcra. Four dorsal fulcra are found in front of the fin with at least twenty-four dorsal caudal being found along the entire length of the upper lobe.

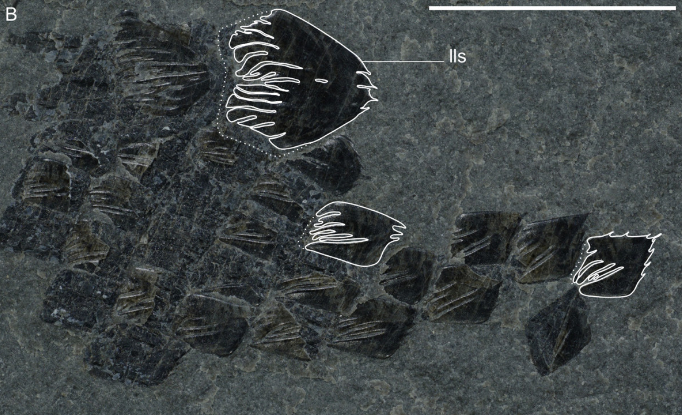
The lateral line and trunk scales, showing the major differences between the two.

The scalation of Ostenolepis differs throughout the fish though they are generally rhombic and have a maximum size of 2 millimetres (0.079 in) in both width and height. The anterior end of the scales possess two or more grooves that run parallel to one another while the posterior end of the scales have two to six spines made out of ganoine. Along with these spines, the entire surface of the scales are covered in a thick layer of ganoine. The smallest scales are located on the ventral side of the fish between the pectoral and pelvic fins. These are also more rectangular and the ornamentation is decreased. The exact number of scales that make up of lateral line of Ostenolipis is unknown though at least forty-five are known. These scales end at the base of the caudal fin and largely differ from the other scales on the fish. They are about two times the depth of the other scales and are more shield-shaped. The anterior ornamentation is more extreme than in other scales and the ganoine spines are only along the longitudinal axis. A single opening for the lateral line system is located on the unornamented surface of each of these scales.

== Paleoenvironment ==
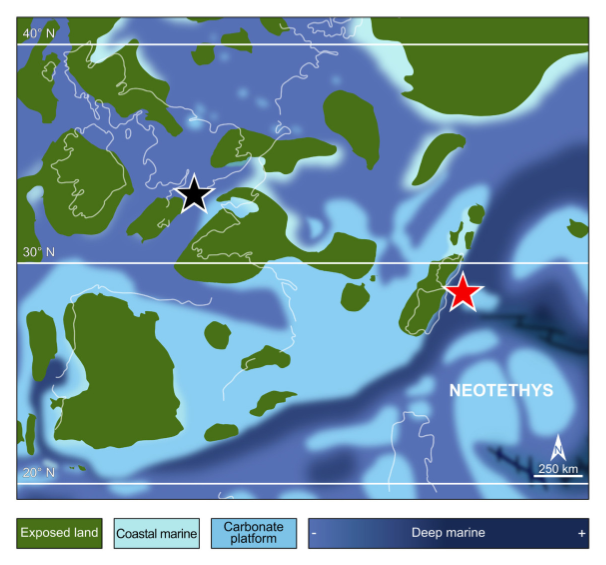
The paleogeography of the northwestern Neotethys showing the locations of Osteno (red star) and Lyme Regis (black star)

The Osteno Konservat-Lagerstatte represents a marine ecosystem that dates to the Sinemurian age of the Early Jurassic. Similar to a number of other well-preserved sites, the seafloor of the ecosystem would have been anoxic during certain periods of time though it would have largely been dysaerobic. This is suggested to be due to a lack of currents that reached the seafloor in the area. Even with the low oxygen conditions of the basin, benthic groups like brachiopods, bristle stars, sponges, and bivalves have been found. Based on similarities between the sponges seen at Osteno and modern neritic–pelagic ecosystems, suggesting that the basin was decently deep. A large amount of the fish fauna is comparable to the similarly aged Lyme Regis. Due to the poor preservation of fish at the site and the anoxic seafloor conditions, it is suggested that fish like Ostenolepis would have lived farther up in the water column.
