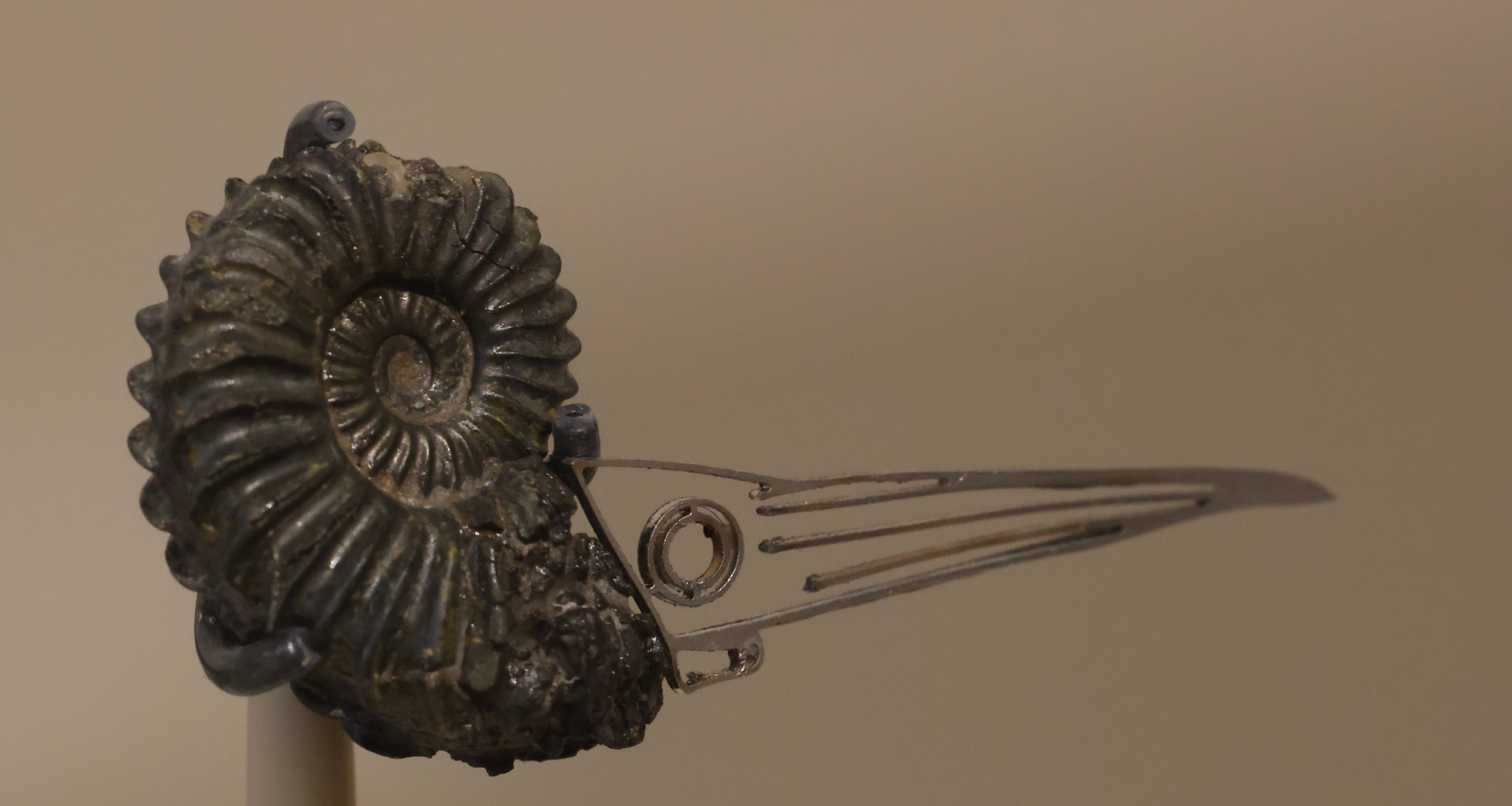
- Schlotheimia lymense

Scientific classification
- Kingdom: Animalia
- Phylum: Mollusca
- Class: Cephalopoda
- Subclass: †Ammonoidea
- Order: †Ammonitida
- Family: †Schlotheimiidae
- Genus: †Schlotheimia; Bayle, 1878

Synonyms
- Anguliferites Lange, 1951; Scamnoceras Lange, 1924

= Schlotheimia =

Schlotheimia Temporal range: Jurassic, 201.6–189.6 Ma

Genus of molluscs (fossil)

Schlotheimia is a genus of extinct cephalopods belonging to the subclass Ammonoidea that lived during the Hettangian stage at the beginning of the Early Jurassic.

== Description ==
The shell, or conch, of Schlotheimia rather evolute, coiled with all whorls exposed and only slightly embracing. The umbilicus is perforate as with more finely ribbed Angulaticeras. whorls are compressed, bearing ribs that cross the venter in chevrons, less developed in Sulciferites

== Distribution ==
Fossils of Schlotheimia species have been found in Lower Jurassic rocks of Argentina, Austria, Belgium, Canada, France, Germany, Indonesia, Italy, Luxembourg, Switzerland, United Kingdom, United States.
