= Macrogrammites =

Macrogrammites Temporal range: 201.6–196.5 Ma

Scientific classification
- Kingdom: Animalia
- Phylum: Mollusca
- Class: Cephalopoda
- Subclass: †Ammonoidea
- Order: †Ammonitida
- Family: †Schlotheimiidae
- Genus: †Macrogrammites; Buckman, 1928

Species
- Storthoceras australe; Storthoceras garfieldense

Synonyms
- Storthoceras

Genus of molluscs (fossil)

Macrogrammites is an extinct genus of cephalopod belonging to the ammonite subclass.
