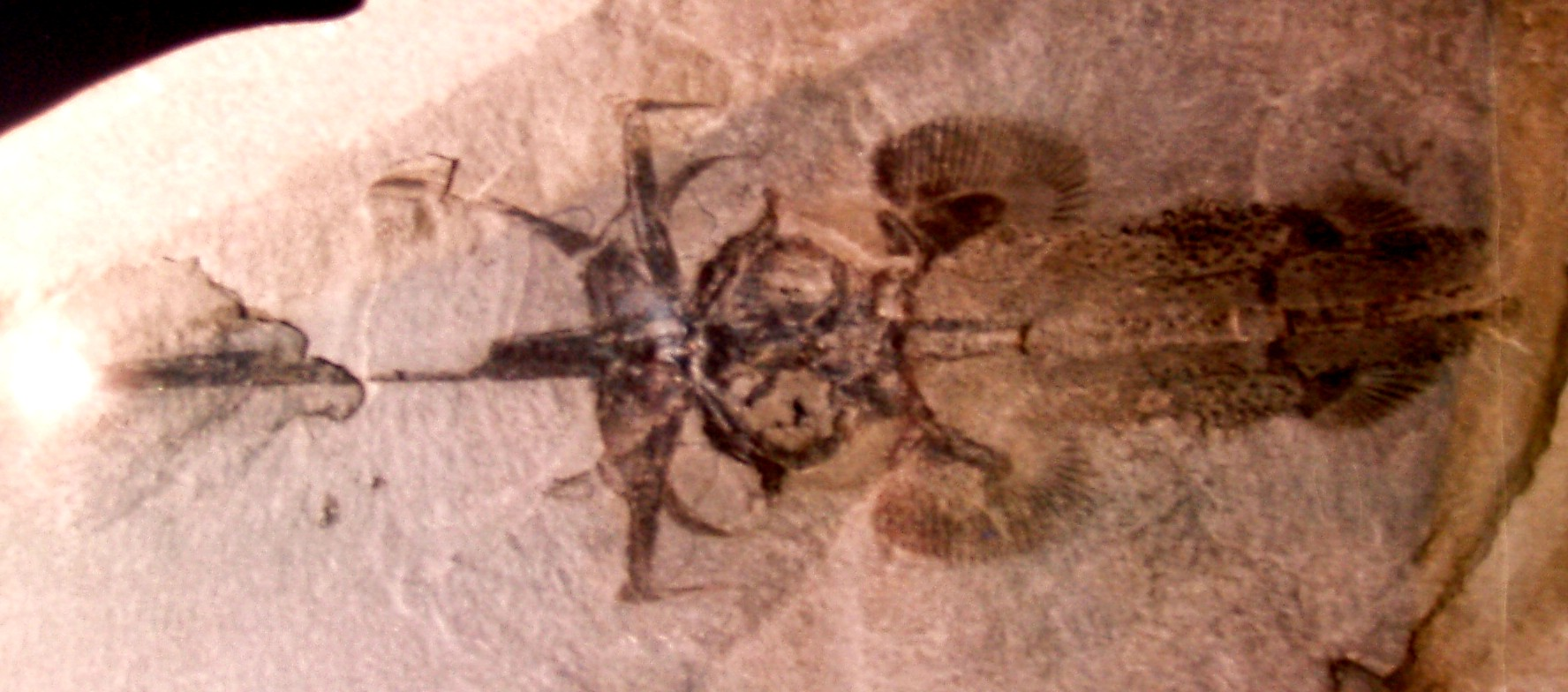
- S. polyspondyla fossil
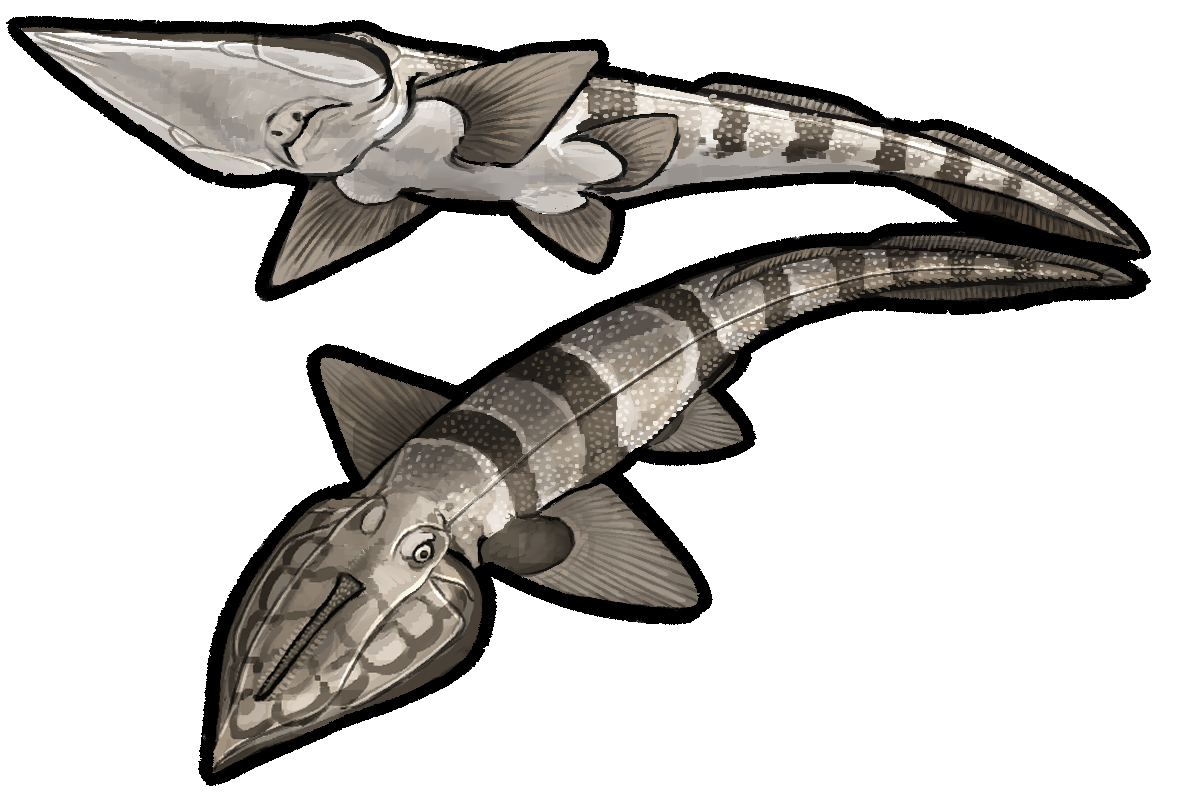
- Life reconstruction of a male and female S. polyspondyla

Scientific classification
- Kingdom: Animalia
- Phylum: Chordata
- Class: Chondrichthyes
- Subclass: Holocephali
- Order: Chimaeriformes
- Suborder: †Squalorajoidei
- Family: †Squalorajidae; Woodward, 1886
- Genus: †Squaloraja; Riley, 1833
- Species: †S. polyspondyla

Binomial name
- †Squaloraja polyspondyla (Agassiz, 1836)

Synonyms
- †Squalo-raia dolichognathos Riley, 1833; †Spinacorhinus polyspondylus Agassiz, 1836; †Squaloraja tenuispina Woodward, 1886

= Squaloraja =

Squaloraja Temporal range: Early Jurassic, Hettangian to Sinemurian

Extinct genus of cartilaginous fishes

Squaloraja (Latin for "shark-skate") is an extinct genus of ray-like marine chimaeriform fish from the Early Jurassic of Europe.

== Taxonomy ==
It contains a single named species known from the Sinemurian-aged Blue Lias of Lyme Regis, England: S. polyspondyla Agassiz, 1836, with complete specimens representing both males and females. A second species from the same locality, S. tenuispina Woodward, 1886 (known from an isolated horn of a male), is now considered conspecific with S. polyspondyla. In addition, the complete specimen of the female of an indeterminate species is known from the Sinemurian-aged Moltrasio Formation of Osteno, Italy, and indeterminate teeth are known from the earlier Hettangian of Belgium.

Divergence estimates suggest that Squaloraja was a relict taxon and the last surviving member of a chimaera lineage that had diverged from the Chimaeroidei by the late Mississippian stage of the Carboniferous period, as stem-chimaeroids already appear in the fossil record by that point. The predicted existence of a Paleozoic relative of Squaloraja was confirmed in 2023 with the description of the putative mid-Mississippian squalorajoid Sulcacanthus, which had a similar elongated rostrum, although it is unknown if it had a similar ovate shape. Between these two genera is a ghost lineage of more than 130 million years.

== Description ==
Squaloraja was most closely related to modern chimaeras, but appeared completely unlike any living chimaera. Individuals of Squaloraja had flattened, ray-like bodies with enormous, flattened rostra that comprised half of the body length & were lined with limited denticles, giving them a superficial resemblance to a sawfish with a very wide, ovate "saw". Males had a cephalic clasper extending out from just above the rostrum that resembled a long, horn-like process.

== History ==
The type specimen was found by Mary Anning in 1829. This specimen was held at the Bristol Museum, and aside from the tail, was destroyed during The Blitz. The taxon was first described as Squalo-raia dolichognathos by Henry Riley in 1833 based on Anning's specimen, who identified it as a chondrichthyan with features of both sharks and rays, but this description was not publicly released until several years later. In 1836, Louis Agassiz described the species as Spinacorhinus polyspondylus based on the same specimen. Following the publishing of Riley's description, Agassiz amended the genus name in 1843 to Squaloraja, but retained his own species name. This overriding of Riley's species name violates the principle of priority, but Agassiz's name has been retained due to its longtime use in the scientific literature.

During description, Agassiz noted the similarity of the specimen to the sawshark Pristiophorus. In 1890, George Bond Howes was the first researcher to identify Squaloraja as a holocephalan.

== See also ==
- List of prehistoric cartilaginous fish
