= Crassodontidanus =

Crassodontidanus Temporal range: Sinemurian–Hauterivian

Scientific classification
- Kingdom: Animalia
- Phylum: Chordata
- Class: Chondrichthyes
- Subclass: Elasmobranchii
- Division: Selachii
- Order: Hexanchiformes
- Family: †Crassodontidanidae
- Genus: †Crassodontidanus; Kriwet & Klug, 2011

Extinct genus of sharks

Crassodontidanus is an extinct genus of sharks and the sole member of the family Crassodontidanidae, in the order Hexanchiformes. It contains two extinct species.

== Species ==
- Crassodontidanus serratus Fraas, 1855
- Crassodontidanus wiedenrothi Thies, 1983
