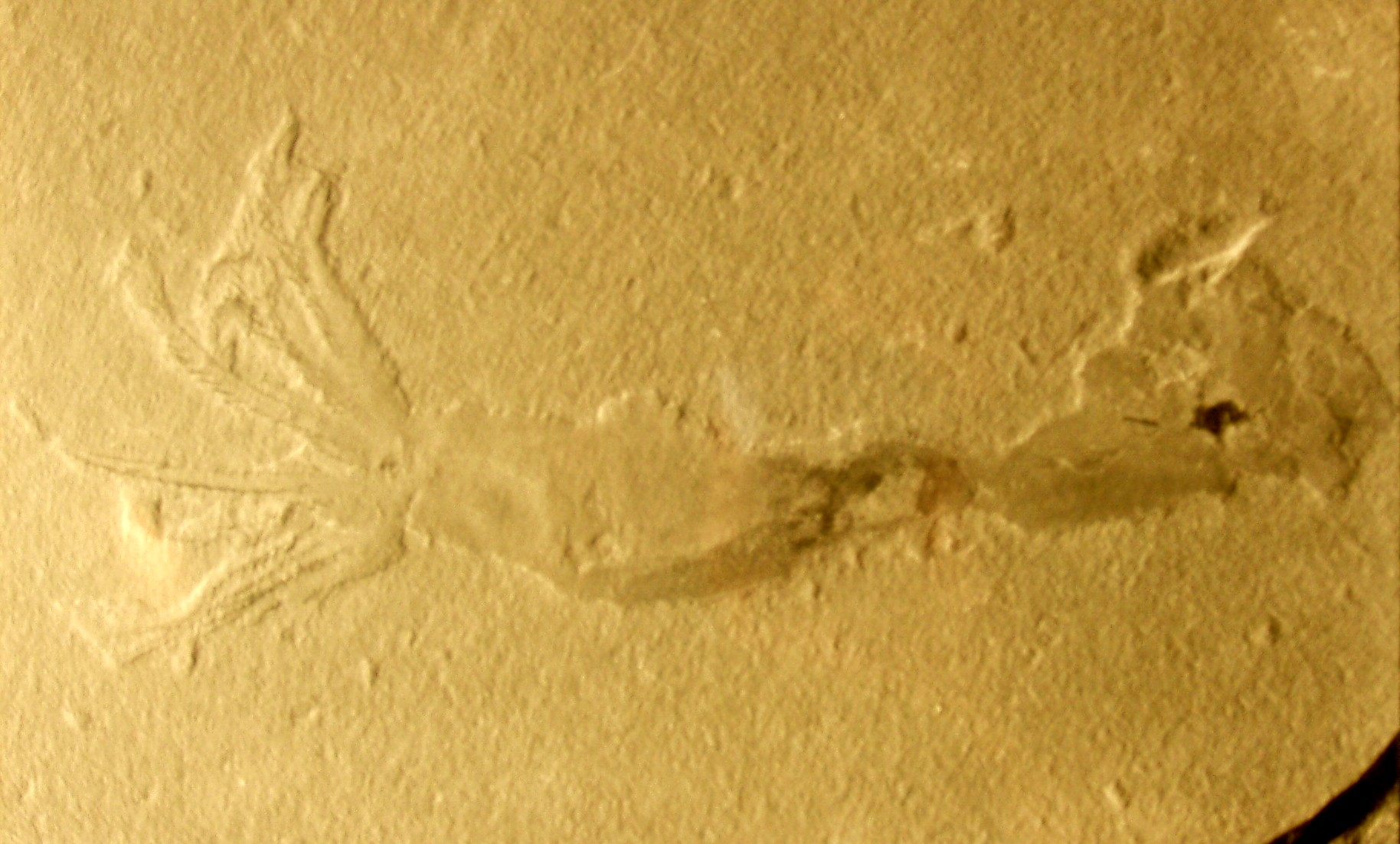
- The holotype of Ostenoteuthis siroi. Visible features include 10 arms, jaw, gladius, gills, displaced ink sac and lateral wing. (See notes on the image.)

Scientific classification
- Kingdom: Animalia
- Phylum: Mollusca
- Class: Cephalopoda
- Subclass: Coleoidea
- Family: †Ostenoteuthidae; Garassino & Donovan, 2000

= Ostenoteuthidae =

Ostenoteuthidae Temporal range: Sinemurian

Extinct family of molluscs

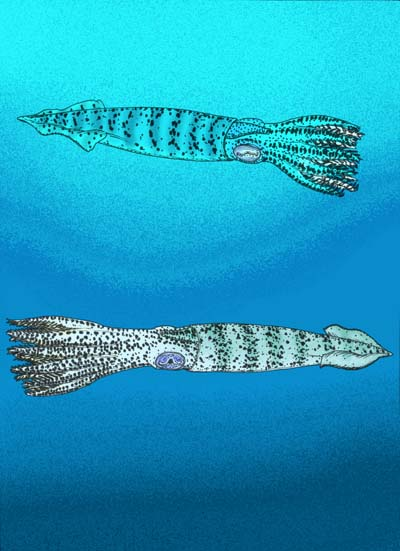
Artist's reconstructions of Uncinoteuthis cuvieri and Ostenoteuthis siroi.

Ostenoteuthidae is an extinct family of cephalopods from Lower Jurassic of Italy. They had ten arms with unusual structure.

Both known species are from Lower Sinemurian.

The type locality for up to date known two species is near village Osteno, Lake Lugano, Province of Como, northern Italy. Eight specimens from this family are stored in Museo Civico di Storia Naturale di Milano in Milan, Italy.

== Genera ==
- Ostenoteuthis Garassino & Donovan, 2000
  - Ostenoteuthis siroi Garassino & Donovan, 2000 - from Lower Sinemurian. (photo)
- Uncinoteuthis Garassino & Donovan, 2000
  - Uncinoteuthis cuvieri Garassino & Donovan, 2000 - from Lower Sinemurian.
