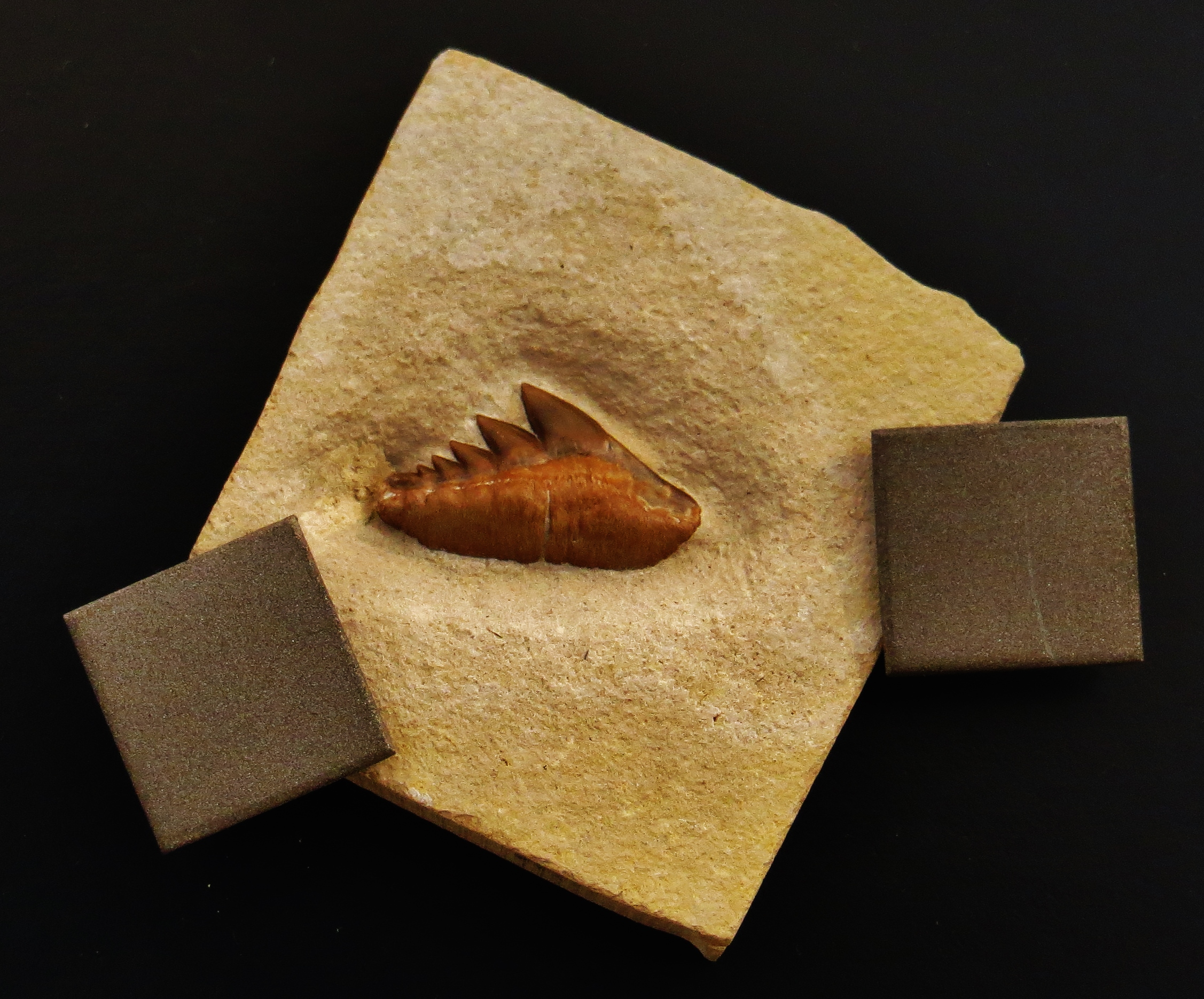
- Notidanoides tooth

Scientific classification
- Kingdom: Animalia
- Phylum: Chordata
- Class: Chondrichthyes
- Subclass: Elasmobranchii
- Division: Selachii
- Order: Hexanchiformes
- Family: †Crassodontidanidae; Kriwet & Klug, 2016

Genera
- †Crassodontidanus; †Notidanoides; †Pachyhexanchus

Synonyms
- Crassonotidae Kriwet & Klug, 2011 (nomen nudum)

= Crassodontidanidae =

Crassodontidanidae Temporal range: Sinemurian-Hauterivian

Extinct family of sharks

Crassodontidanidae is a family of extinct cow sharks that lived from the Early Jurassic to the Early Cretaceous. It contains three genera: Crassodontidanus, Notidanoides, and Pachyhexanchus.
