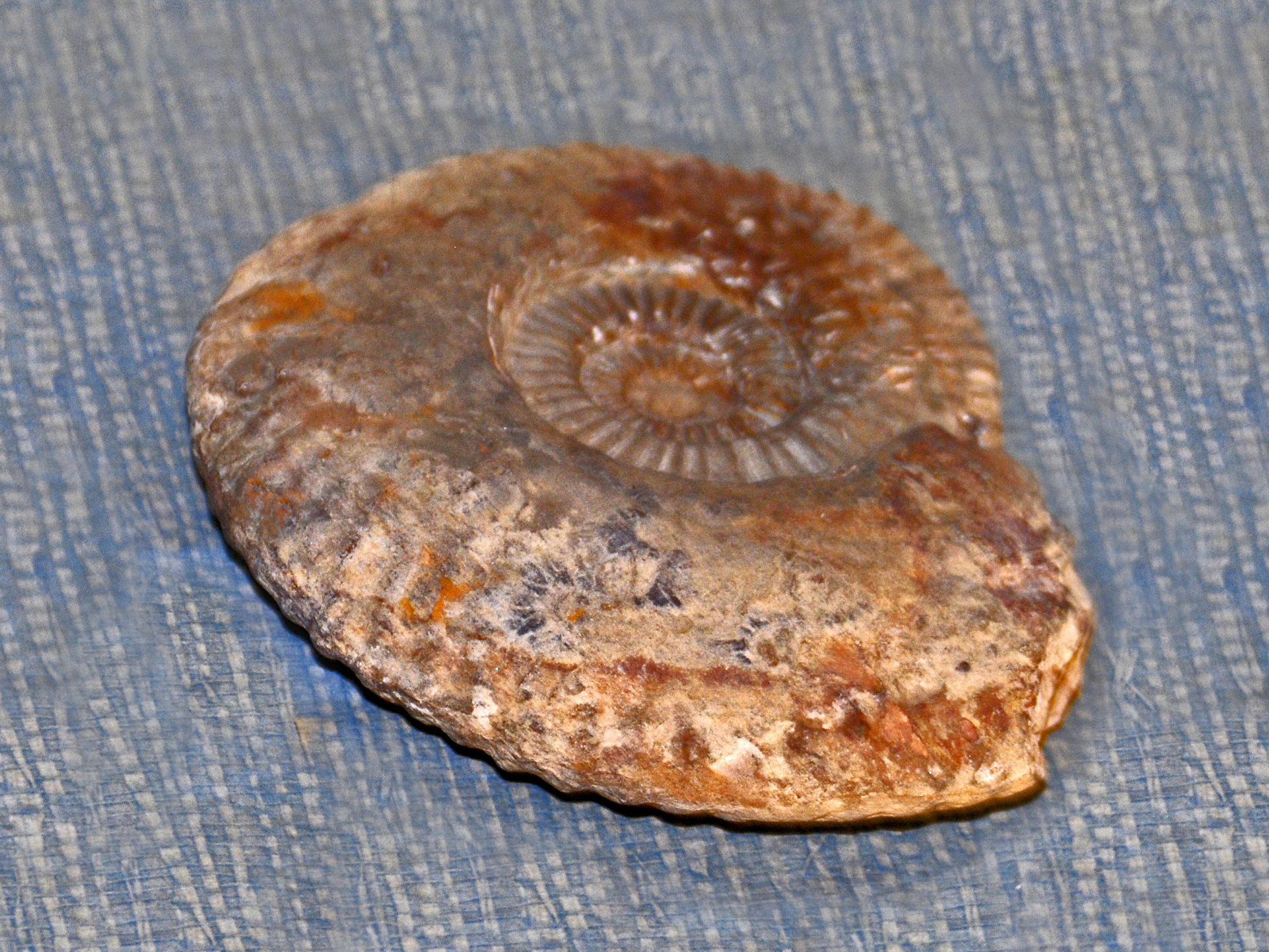
- Fossil shells of Schlotheimia depressa from Germany, on display at Galerie de paléontologie et d'anatomie comparée in Paris

Scientific classification
- Kingdom: Animalia
- Phylum: Mollusca
- Class: Cephalopoda
- Subclass: †Ammonoidea
- Order: †Ammonitida
- Suborder: †Ammonitina
- Superfamily: †Psiloceratoidea
- Family: †Schlotheimiidae; Spath 1923

= Schlotheimiidae =

Schlotheimiidae Temporal range: Early Jurassic, Hettangian– Sinemurian

Extinct family of molluscs

Schlotheimiidae is an extinct family of cephalopods belonging to the Ammonite subclass. These cephalopods existed in the Jurassic period.

== Genera ==
- Angulaticeras
- Kammerkarites
- Macrogrammites
- Saxoceras
- Schlotheimia
- Waehneroceras

== Distribution ==
Fossils of species within this family have been found in the Early Jurassic rocks of Argentina, Austria, Belgium, Canada, China, France, Germany, Hungary, Indonesia, Italy, Luxembourg, Madagascar, Mexico, Russia, Switzerland, United Kingdom, United States.
