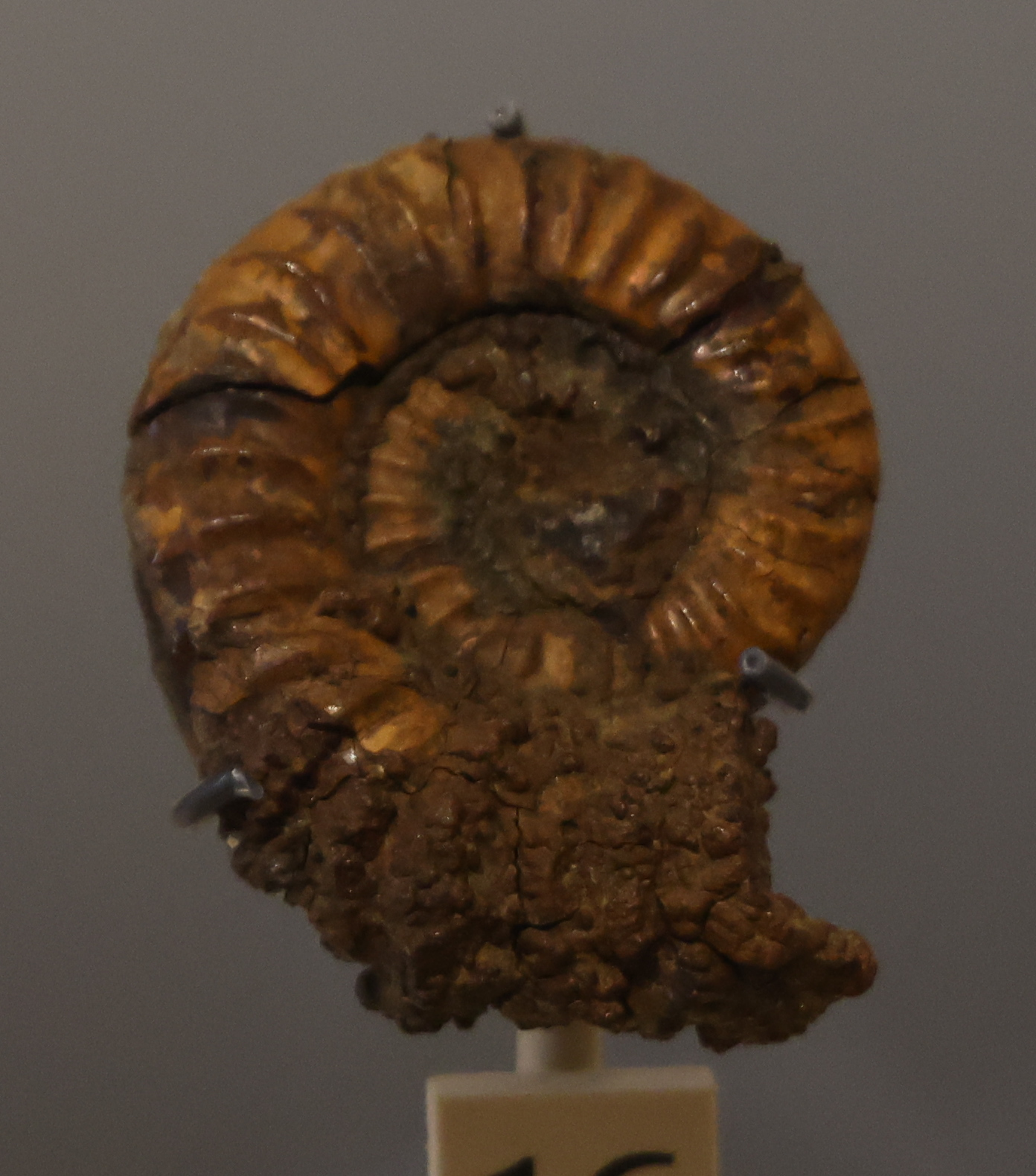
- Waehneroceras iapetus

Scientific classification
- Kingdom: Animalia
- Phylum: Mollusca
- Class: Cephalopoda
- Subclass: †Ammonoidea
- Order: †Ammonitida
- Family: †Schlotheimiidae
- Genus: †Waehneroceras; Hyatt, 1889

Species
- None cataloged

Synonyms
- Curviceras; Teneroceras

= Waehneroceras =

Waehneroceras Temporal range: Hettangian

Genus of molluscs (fossil)

Waehneroceras is an extinct genus of cephalopod belonging to the Ammonite subclass.

== Distribution ==
Jurassic of Argentina, Austria, Canada, Hungary and the United Kingdom.
