= Angulaticeras =

Angulaticeras Temporal range: Sinemurian

Scientific classification
- Kingdom: Animalia
- Phylum: Mollusca
- Class: Cephalopoda
- Subclass: †Ammonoidea
- Order: †Ammonitida
- Family: †Schlotheimiidae
- Genus: †Angulaticeras; Quenstedt, 1883

Synonyms
- Aegoceras Waagen, 1869; Gydanoceras Repin, 1972; Hongkongites Grabau, 1928; Oegoceras Whitfield & Hovey, 1906

Extinct genus of molluscs

Angulaticeras is an extinct genus of cephalopod belonging to the ammonite subclass.
