= Pteroniscus =

Pteroniscus Temporal range: late Middle Jurassic-early Late Jurassic ~165–155 Ma

Scientific classification
- Kingdom: Animalia
- Phylum: Chordata
- Class: Actinopterygii
- Order: †Palaeonisciformes
- Genus: †Pteroniscus; Berg, 1949

Type species
- †Oxygnathus turkestanensis Gorizdro-Kulczycka, 1926

Extinct genus of fishes

Pteroniscus is an extinct genus of prehistoric "palaeoniscoid" ray-finned fish that lived during the Jurassic period in what is now Kazakhstan, Central Asia. Fossils were recovered from the late Middle Jurassic or early Late Jurassic (Callovian/Oxfordian) Karabastau Formation in the Tian Shan mountains.

== Classification ==
Pteroniscus is a late representative of the Palaeonisciformes, a group of archaic bony fish typical of the Paleozoic Era that survived until the lower Cretaceous. The relationships of Pteroniscus within the group are not clear, although in the past it was associated with the families Palaeoniscidae, Coccolepididae and Uighuroniscidae. A recent study suggests that Pteroniscus might be closely related to Daqingshaniscus. Attribution at the family level is currently left as incertae sedis.

== See also ==
- Prehistoric fish
- List of prehistoric bony fish
