= Claino con Osteno =

Claino con Osteno Scin Osten (Lombard)
- Comune
- Comune di Claino con Osteno
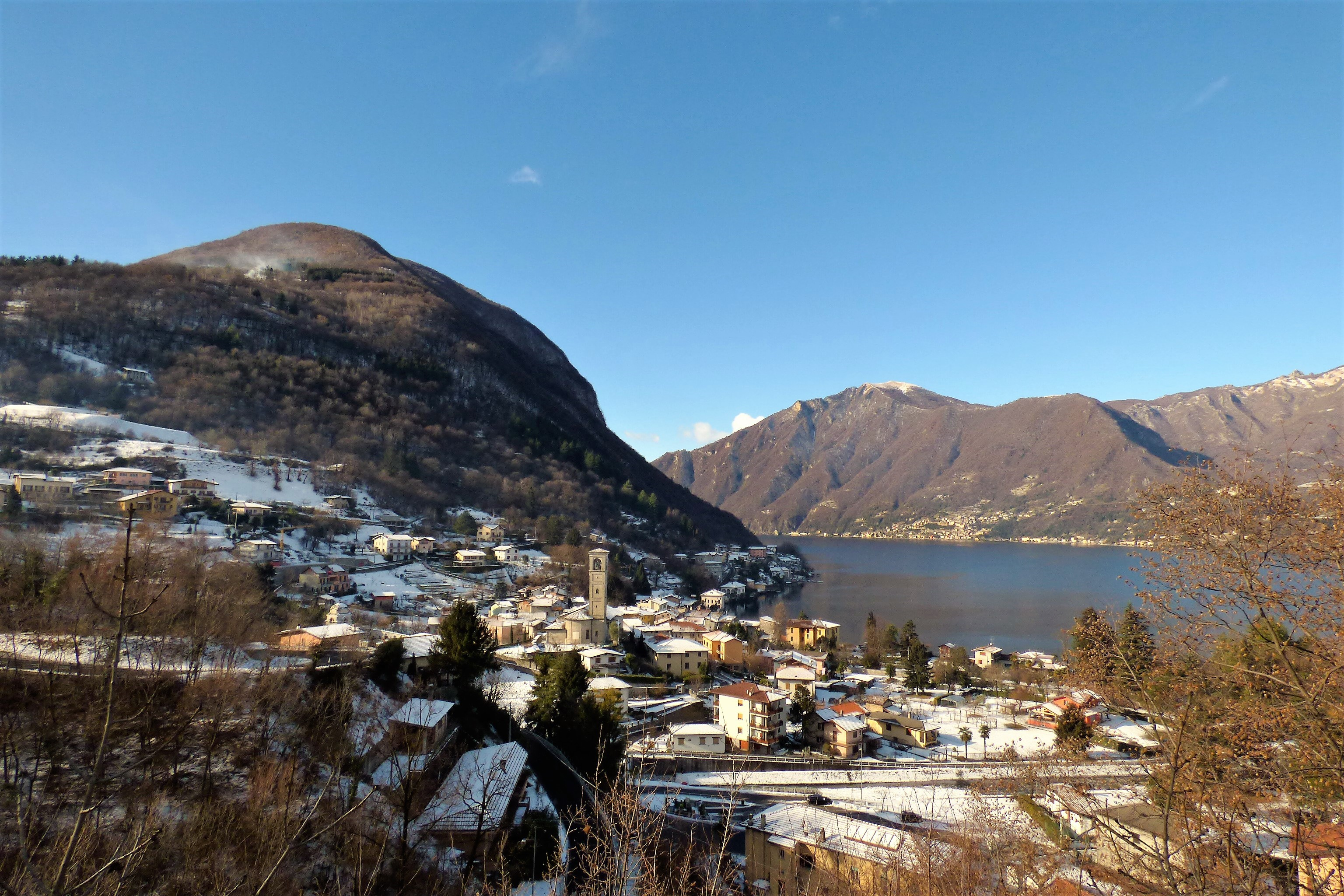

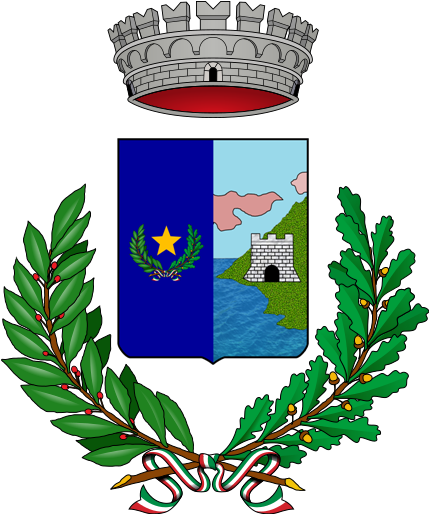
- Coat of arms

- Location within Italy Location within Lombardy
- Coordinates: 46°0′N 9°5′E
- Country: Italy
- Region: Lombardy
- Province: Como (CO)
- Frazioni: Barclaino, Rescia, Righeggia, San Lucio

Government
  - Mayor: Alessandra De Bernardi

Area
  - Total: 13.1 km^{2} (5.1 sq mi)
- Elevation: 280 m (920 ft)

Population (31 March 2017)
  - Total: 555
  - Density: 42.4/km^{2} (110/sq mi)
- Demonym(s): Clainesi and Ostenesi
- Time zone: UTC+1 (CET)
  - Summer (DST): UTC+2 (CEST)
- Postal code: 22010
- Dialing code: 0344

Claino con Osteno (Comasco: Scin Osten [ˌʃĩː uˈstẽː]) is a comune (municipality) in the Province of Como in the Italian region of Lombardy, located about 60 kilometres (37 mi) north of Milan and about 20 kilometres (12 mi) north of Como. It is a small comune on Lake Lugano, composed of a series of small frazioni (hamlets): the biggest ones (Claino and Osteno) have been chosen for the municipal name.

Claino con Osteno borders the following municipalities: Alta Valle Intelvi, Laino, Ponna, Porlezza, Valsolda.

Near Osteno is a site belonging to the Moltrasio Formation, which preserves numerous late-Jurassic fossils characterized by integral fossilization such as Squaloraja polyspondyla.
