= Paleobiota of the Posidonia Shale =

Fossil flora and fauna in the Posidonia Shale, Germany

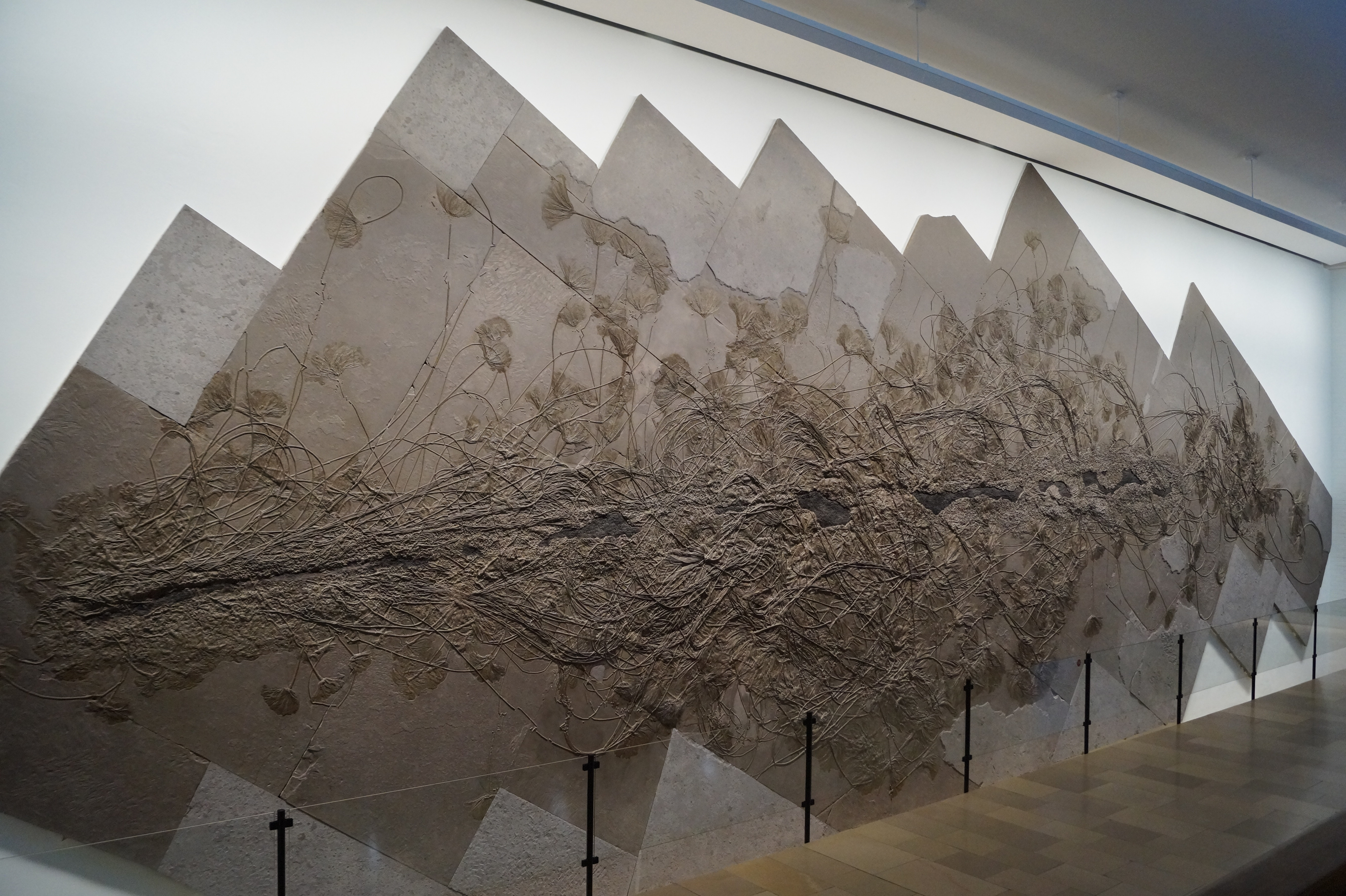
18x6 m fossilized floating wood (Agathoxylon), with Crinoids attached (Pentacrinites & Seirocrinus). It is one of the most emblematic fossils of the formation, where the anoxic seas of the lower toarcian lead to an exquisite preservation.

The Sachrang Formation or "Posidonienschiefer" Formation (common name the "Posidonia Shale") is a geological formation of southwestern Germany, northern Switzerland, northwestern Austria, southeast Luxembourg and the Netherlands, that spans about 3 million years during the Early Jurassic period (early Toarcian stage). It is known for its detailed fossils, especially marine biota, listed below. Composed mostly of black shale, the formation is a Lagerstätte, where fossils show exceptional preservation (including exquisite soft tissues), with a thickness that varies from about 1 m to about 40 m on the Rhine level, being on the main quarry at Holzmaden between 5 and 14 m. Some of the preserved material has been transformed into the fossil hydrocarbon jet which, especially jet derived from wood remains, is used for jewelry. The exceptional preservation seen in the Posidonia Shale has been studied since the late 1800s, finding that a cocktail of chemical and environmental factors led to such an impressive preservation of the marine fauna. The most common theory is that changes in the oxygen level, where the different anoxic events of the Toarcian left oxygen-depleted bottom waters, stopped scavengers from consuming the dead bodies.

== Biological interactions ==
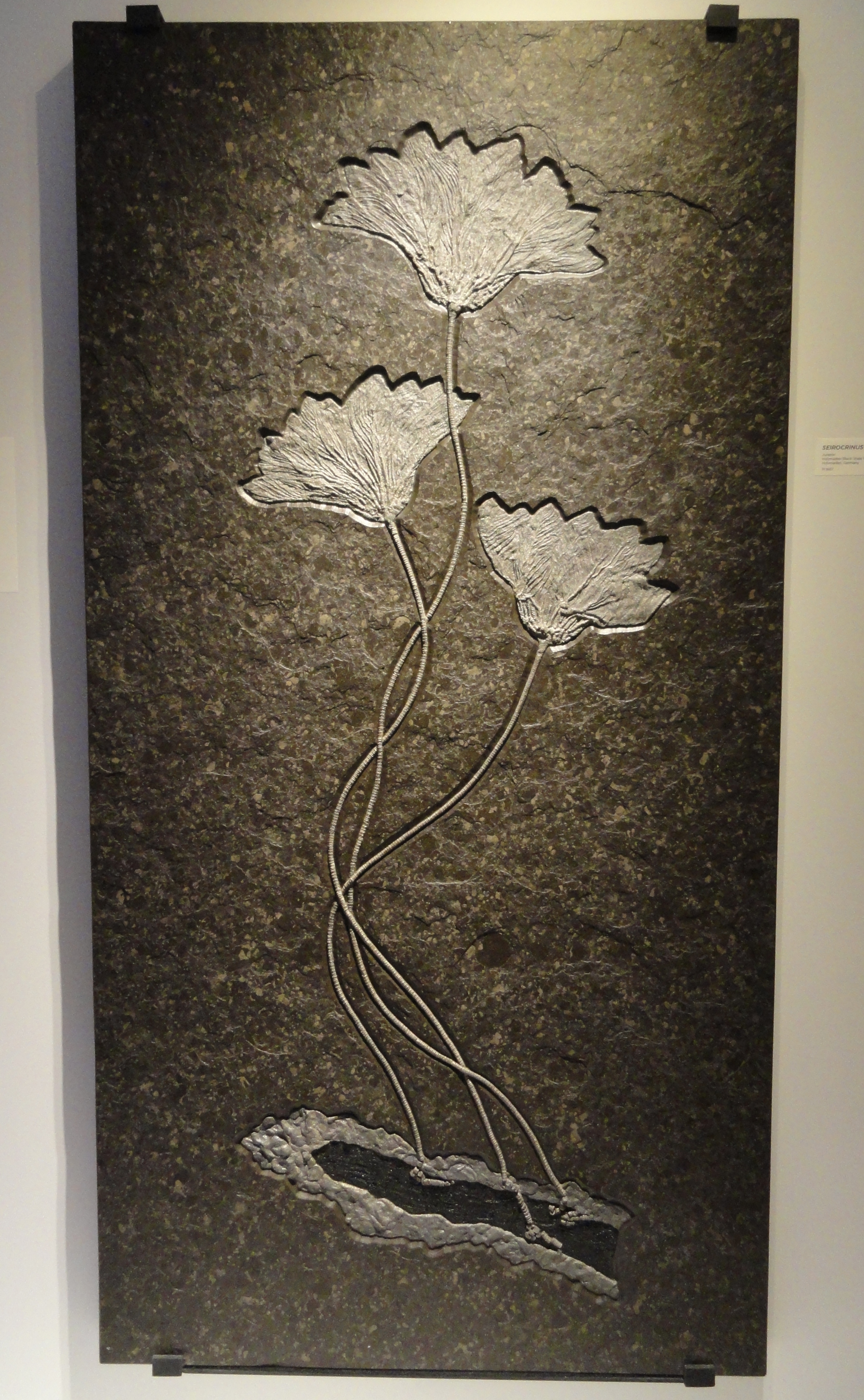
Seirocrinus subsingularis stems over a branch

- The "Monotis"-Dactylioceras bed shows an accumulation of the bivalves Meleagrinella substriata and the ammonite Dactylioceras, that were the most abundant representatives of its group on the Altdorf region, and were probably washed to near epicontinental waters by a rapid event, or as result of a large succession of events. This assemblage has been compared with modern Brazilian coastal mangroves and also linked to tsunami events.

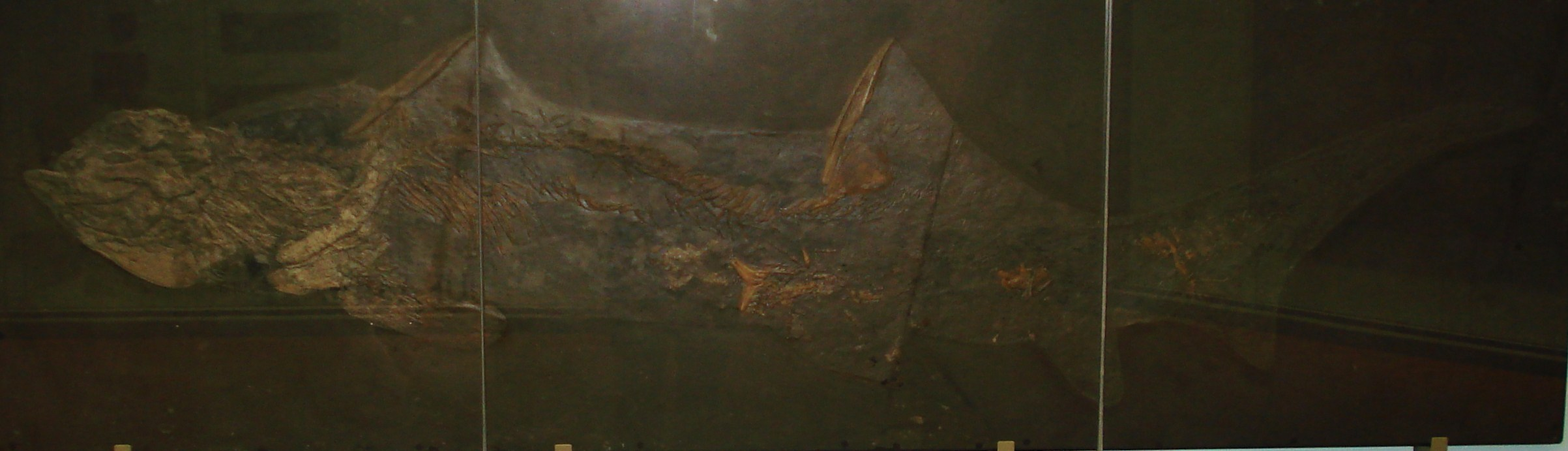
Hybodus hauffianus with skin and Belemnnite traces

- Several empty ammonite shells from Holzmaden have been found with associated decapods inside. This includes a possible member of the genus Paleastacus inside a chamber of a Harpoceras. This decapod is related to the family Erymidae, which are considered to be possible bottom-dweller carnivores or carrion feeders. The associated fossil has several spherical structures that had been interpreted as decapod coprolites, implying that the animal lived for a long period within the shell. More recent studies had recovered new data about the inquilinism of decapods inside ammonites, this time, however, recovering three eryonoids together within a body chamber. The eryonoids most likely used the ammonoid as some kind of shelter, possibly due to the shell being an ideal location to molt, protection against predators, a source of food or that the shell was used as a long-term shelter. One key aspect found was that the muddy bottom was not suitable for burrowing, implying that the decapods inhabited a different shelter due to being unable to make their own. Other biota are found related to the decayed ammonite shells, such as serpulid annelids and bivalves, creating what was denominated as "benthic islands".
- Beyond trace fossils, several vertebrate specimens show associations with crustacean exoskeletal remains such as GPIT-PV-31586 and SMNS 58389 (Pachycormus macropterus) with necrophagous interaction as well SMNS 55934 (Stenopterygius quadriscissus) or SMNS 95401 (Metopacanthus sp.).
- The genus Clarkeiteuthis and its predatory behaviour, found associated with fishes of the genus Leptolepis. Based on the position of prey and predator, it was suggested that the cephalopods caught and killed the fishes while the schools were still in well-oxygenated waters and then descended into oxygen-depleted water layers where the cephalopod suffocated and died attached to its prey. The cephalopods' arms were contracted over the fish, likely killing it quickly by cutting its spine.
- Several Geotheutis have been reported with eumelanin preserved along with their ink sacs.
- A specimen of Jeletzkyteuthis found in Ohmden has appeared predating a Parabelopeltis. The association of these 2 genera shows the predatory behaviour of this group when its members lived in epicontinental seas, which is rather different than extant Vampyromorphs.
- A pabulite (fossilized meal which never entered the digestive tract) was recovered from Holzmaden, being composed of an associated Passaloteuthis laevigata with its arms embracing an exuvia of a crustacean. The belemnnite itself can be seen as the remnant of a failed predation attempt from a Hybodus, corroborating a possible tropic chain.

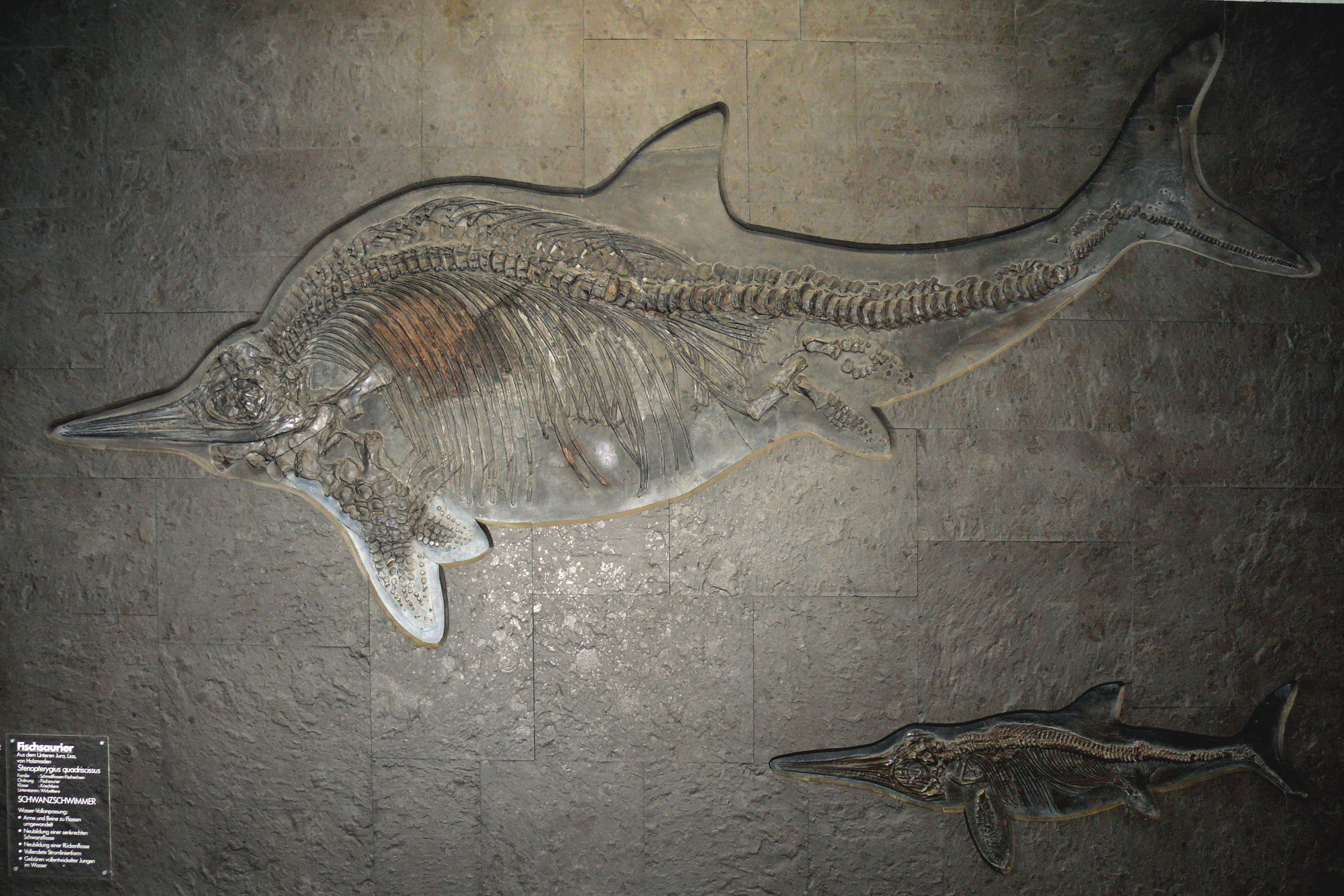
Stenopterygius quadriscissus, mother with embryo

- One of the most complex organism interactions on the Posidonia Shale were the crinoid megarafts that grouped a wide variety of animals, creating large floating ecosystems. The largest megaraft found measured 18 metres (59 ft), and is based on an Agathoxylon trunk, where different animals were attached. The first attached animals would have been the growing community of oysters, bivalves and crinoids, that would add a small weight to the raft (about 800 kilograms (1,800 lb)). The presence of these megarafts were in part possible due to the absence of marine wood worms which destroy tree logs in less than 3 years along with the absence of modern raft wood predators (that appeared on the Bathonian). These rafts could last up to 5 years, which is the main reason the crinoids attached were able to reach huge sizes. These rafts were likely also essential to distribute animals along sea basins. Seirocrinus & Pentacrinites were some of the main crinoid colonizers of the floating rafts. Seirocrinus is the main representative of the pelagic crinoids, being among the longest animals known, reaching 26 m long in the largest documented specimen. The ecology of the genus is widely known, with it being known that the smallest stems were among the first animals to colonize the rafts, with at least 2 generations of crinoids found per raft, where the hydrodynamic changes of the log influenced the settlement of the crinoids. It is believed that Seirocrinus underwent seasonal reproduction linked to monsoonal conditions that sent new logs to the sea. The large crinoids would have feed on pelagic micronutrients, and after the log fell to the bottom, all of the colony would have died.
- Thoracic barnacles of the genus Toarcolepas became the oldest epiplanktonic barnacle known in the fossil record, probably motivated by the appearance of the giant crinoid rafts. It has been found in situ associated with fossil wood.

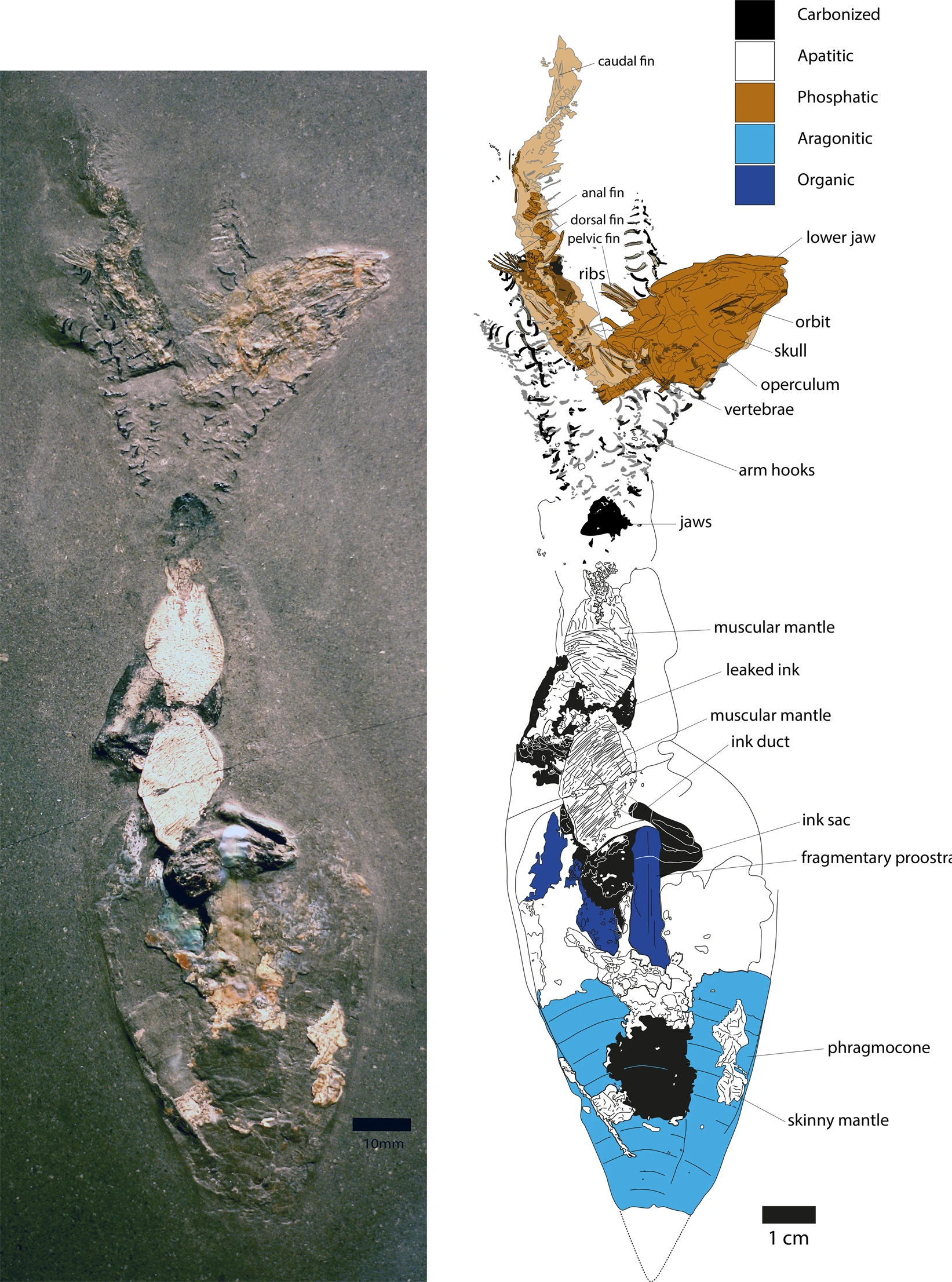
Fossil of Clarkeiteuthis preying on Leptolepis

- The shark Hybodus includes specimens with gastric contents full of belemnnite fragments. This implies active predatory behaviour by the genus towards several kinds of belemnnites, such as Youngibelus.
- A speiballen (a regurgitated mass composed of indigestible stomach contents) had been found in the Holzmaden quarry. The speiballen measures 285 mm in length with a diameter of 160 mm, and consists of 4 members of the genus Dapedium (Dapediidae) and a jaw identified as Lepidotes (Semionotidae). The maker of this speiballen has been suggested to be a shark like Hybodus, an actinopterygian or a marine reptile.
- A specimen of Pachycormus has been found with stomach contents that include hooks similar to the ones found on genera like Clarkeiteuthis.
- Another specimen of Pachycormus macropterus preserves an ammonite inside its gut, likely swallowed by accident and directly responsible for the fish's death.
- SMNS 51144 (Saurostomus esocinus) was found with Chondrites sp. burrows in the abdominal cavity, what indicates a possible opportunistic scavenger. Other Chondrites sp. includes SMNS 17500 and MHH 1981/25 (Stenopterygius uniter) that either suggest the ichthyosaurs were preserved immediately below one such bioturbation horizon or scavenger association.
- The known specimens of Toarcocephalus are evidence of successful predation events, as the head of one was isolated, likely as product of a decapitation, with another preserved within a regurgitated mass.
- One of the most emblematic finds of the formation is that of a mother Stenopterygius giving birth to live young. While specimens have been found with embryos, the bones of these embryos are scattered partly beyond the body limits of the mother. There have been various theories about this scenario: either the bones of embryos had been deposited before the body of the adult went to the sea floor, or in the ichthyosaurs' last moments where it sank to the bottom and may have given untimely birth to some of the foetuses, and finally another option follows post mortem hydrostatic pressure being too high to be prevented by the body, exploding or expelling its embryos.
- The specimen SMNS 53363 (Eurhinosaurus?) from Aichelberg was found with two encrusted large oysters (Liostrea) on the right pterygoid, considered to be part of a reef stage over bones.
- SMNS 80234 (Stenopterygius quadriscissus) represents another female with embryos, yet also shows ribs broken perimortem that may represent either intraspecific aggression or a predation attempt. This specimen has several taxa associated: ammonite aptychi, two ophiuroids (Sinosura brodiei) and an articulated echinoid (Diademopsis crinifera) indicate a short-lived deadfall community.
- SMNS 81841 (Stenopterygius quadriscissus) represents one of the clearest examples of deadfall communities described in the formation: the skeleton is associated with serpulids surrounded by a mass of disarticulated ophiuroid remains, indeterminate echinoid tests, an isolated crinoid ossicle, the byssate bivalve Oxytoma inaequivalvis, the pectinid Propeamussium pumilus, Eopecten strionatis, Plagiostoma sp., Meleagrinella sp., "Cucullaea" muensteri, with the genera Parainoceramya dubia and Liostrea associated with the carcass. As many of these bivalves show overgrowth the community likely persisted for some time. Fossil traces of Gastrochaenolites isp. attributed to mechanical bivalve borers are abundant implicating prolonged exposure of the skeleton on the seafloor.
- SMNS 81719 (Stenopterygius uniter) includes Liostrea, Propeamussium pumilus, Plagiostoma sp. and Parainoceramya dubia, with other invertebrates found (?) not being part of the deadfall community, such as several ammonites and Parainoceramya valves, being stratigraphically below the specimen. This specimen includes also traces of scavenging activity, possibly by crustaceans.
- SMNS 80113, (Stenopterygius triscissus) was found populated by Parainoceramya, a specimen of Eopecten strionatis and an unexpected specimen of the small infaunal lucinid Mesomiltha pumila, equivocal evidence for the sulfophilic stage.
- Local ichthyosaur soft tissues include skin enough well preserved to infer coloration and appearance on the living animal, as well evidence for homeothermy and crypsis.
- Gut contents of the local pterosaurs are known: Campylognathoides preserves hooks of the coleoid Clarkeiteuthis (therefore being one of the few teuthophagous pterosaurs), while Dorygnathus preserves remains of Leptolepis.

== Microbial activity ==
Non-fenestrate stromatolite crusts formed in aphotic deep-water environments during intervals of very low sedimentation are recovered in places such as Teufelsgraben, Hetzles. The stromatolites of this region have evidence of live on a deeper shelf environment with a quietwater deposit which suffered repeated phases of stagnant bottom waters, where a depth water habitat developed, probably at more than 100 meters depth. There is a thin, southern widespread stromatolite crust on the top of the Sachrang Formation, called "Wittelshofener Bank", that has made researchers rethink the depth of the major southern basin of the formation, where the absence of phototrophic calcareous benthic organisms (probably due to the lack of light) shows the depth of the basin. On the "Wittelshofener Bank" there is also the only occurrence of ooids, presumably formed in the same deep-water environment.

Color key: Taxon / Reclassified taxon / Taxon falsely reported as present / Dubious taxon or junior synonym / Ichnotaxon / Ootaxon / Morphotaxon

Notes
Uncertain or tentative taxa are in small text
~~crossed out~~ taxa are discredited.

Genus	Species	Location	Material	Notes	Images
Frutexites	F. arboriformis	Teufelsgraben, Hetzles	Possible traces of Microbial Activity	Secondary binder of the deep-water stromatolites, probably related with archaeal activity. Although Frutexites is a cryptic microfossil resembles shrubs of the cyanobacteria Angulocellularia. In the Posidonia Shale a cryptoendopelitic mode of life is assumed, being only possible for heterotrophic bacteria or fungi.	

== Cyanobacteria ==
Genus	Species	Location	Material	Notes
Girvanella	G. minuta; G. staminea; G. tucci; G. spp.	Chalhac; Reutlingen; Dotternhausen; Mössingen; Gomaringen; Reutlingen; Ohmenhausen; Aselfingen; Schandelah; Hondelange	Crypt laminites	A cyanobacteria, member of the family Oscillatoriales. Girvanella is almost rock-forming in the lower and upper levels, and is very common, but can only rarely be detected in the bituminous clay marl slate due to preservation reasons.

== Rhizaria ==
=== Foraminifera ===
Genus	Species	Location	Material	Notes	Images
Ammodiscus	A. siliceus	Unken	Shells	A benthic foraminiferan, type member of the family Ammodiscinae inside Ammodiscina.	
Annulina	A. metemis	Unken	Shells	A benthic foraminiferan, member of Psammosphaerinae inside the family Psammosphaeridae.	
Astacolus	A. bochardi; A. primus; A. varians; A. matutina	Buttenheim; Unken	Shells	A benthic foraminiferan, member of Vaginulinidae inside the family Vaginulinida (Lagenina).	Drawing of an Astacolus shell
Citharina	C. gradata	Unken	Shells	A benthic foraminiferan, member of Vaginulinidae inside the family Vaginulinida (Lagenina).	
Cornuspira	C. involvens	Buttenheim	Shells	A benthic foraminiferan, type member of Cornuspiridae inside the family Cornuspirida (Lagenina). Round-spiral shell morphology	
Cyclogyra	C. orbicula	Unken	Shells	A benthic foraminiferan, member of the family Cornuspirinae inside Cornuspiridae.	
Dentalina	D. terquiemi; D. matutina; D. vetusta; D. subulata; D. integra; D. sp.	Buttenheim; Unterstürmig; Unken	Shells	A benthic foraminiferan, member of Nodosariidae inside the superfamily Nodosarioidea (Lagenina).	
Flabellinella	F. sp.	Buttenheim	Shells	A benthic foraminiferan, member of Vaginulinidae inside the family Vaginulinida (Lagenina).	
Frondicularia	F. major	Unken	Shells	A benthic foraminiferan, type member of Frondiculariinae inside the family Nodosariidae (Lagenina).	
Glomospira	G. variabilis	Unken	Shells	A benthic foraminiferan, member of the family Usbekistaniinae inside Ammodiscidae.	
Ichthyolaria	I. squamosa; I. sp.	Buttenheim	Shells	A benthic foraminiferan, type member of Ichthyolariidae inside the family Lagenina.	
Involutina	I. liassica	Unken	Shells	A benthic foraminiferan, member of the family Involutinidae inside Involutinae.	
Lenticulina	L. acutiangulata; L. gottingensis; L. subalata; L. gottingensis; L. polygonata; L. sp.	Buttenheim; Unterstürmig; Unken	Shells	A benthic foraminiferan, member of Vaginulinidae inside the family Vaginulinida (Lagenina).	
Lingulina	L. pupa; L. tenera	Unterstürmig; Unken	Shells	A benthic foraminiferan, type member of Lingulininae inside the family Nodosariidae (Lagenina).	
Marginulina	M. oolithica; M. prima	Unterstürmig; Unken	Shells	A benthic foraminiferan, member of Marginulininae inside the family Vaginulinida (Lagenina).	
Nodosaria	N. apheilolocula	Unken	Shells	A benthic foraminiferan, member of Nodosariidae inside the superfamily Nodosarioidea (Lagenina).	
Palmula	P. cuneiformis; P. liassica; P. securiformis	Buttenheim; Unken	Shells	A benthic foraminiferan, member of Vaginulinidae inside the family Vaginulinida (Lagenina).	
Pseudonodosaria	P. melo; P. vulgata; P. multicostata; P. quinquecostata	Unterstürmig; Unken	Shells	A benthic foraminiferan, member of Nodosariidae inside the superfamily Nodosarioidea (Lagenina).	
Reinholdella	R. sp.	Buttenheim	Shells	A benthic foraminiferan, member of Ceratobuliminidae inside the family Robertinida.	
Saracenaria	S. aragonensis	Unterstürmig	Shells	A benthic foraminiferan, member of Lenticulininae inside the family Vaginulinida (Lagenina).	
Spiroplectamina	S. sp.	Unken	Shells	A benthic foraminiferan, member of the family Spiroplectammininae inside Spiroplectamminidae.	
Trocholina	T. umbo	Unken	Shells	A benthic foraminiferan, member of the family Involutinidae inside Involutinae.	
Vaginulina	V. simplex; V. sp.	Buttenheim; Unterstürmig	Shells	A benthic foraminiferan, type member of Vaginulinidae inside the family Vaginulinida (Lagenina).	

== Dinoflagellata ==
=== Dinoflagellate cysts ===
The evolutionary burst of the Toarcian dinoflagellates led the first appearance and rapid radiation of the Phallocystaceae (Susainium, Parvocysta, Phallocysta, Moesiodinium and related forms). This occurred at the time of a widespread Lower Toarcian bituminous anoxia-derived shale, which is recovered from the Posidonienschiefer, Pozzale, Italy, Asturias, Spain, Bornholm, Denmark, the Lusitanian Basin of Portugal, the Jet Rock Formation in Yorkshire and to the "Schistes Carton" in northern France. Whether there is a causal connection in this co-occurrence of Phallocystaceae and bituminous facies is a problem still to be resolved. This family has its acme in diversity and quantity in the latest Toarcian and became less important in the Aalenian.

Genus	Species	Location	Material	Notes	Images
Apodinium	A. fioccosum; A. glabrum	Dotternhausen; Gomaringen; Aselfingen	Cysts	A dinoflagellate cyst from the family Apodiniaceae. An ectoparasitic dinoflagellate, whose hosts are normally tunicates	
Argentiella	A. bifuminosa	Aselfingen; Gomaringen	Cysts	A dinoflagellate cyst from the family Scriniocassiaceae.	
Balechiodinium	B. concicum	Aselfingen; Gomaringen	Cysts	A dinoflagellate cyst from the family Scriniocassiaceae.	
Comparodinium	C. koessenium; C. lineatum; C. punctatum; C. scalatum; C. stipulatum	Gomaringen; Salem Borehole	Cysts	A dinoflagellate cyst from the family Comparodiniaceae.	
Eyachia	E. priscus	Aselfingen; Gomaringen	Cysts	A dinoflagellate cyst from the family Scriniocassiaceae.	
Luehndea	L. spinosa	Bisingen/Zimmern; Salem Borehole	Cysts	A dinoflagellate cyst, type member of Luehndeoideae. Luehndea spinosa is common in the middle layers of the lower Sachrang Formation, while restricted to certain areas in younger ones.	
Mancodinium	M. semitabulatum; M. sp.	Aselfingen; Bisingen/Zimmern; Gomaringen; Salem Borehole	Cysts	A dinoflagellate cyst, type member of Mancodiniaceae.	
Mendicodinium	M. spinosum; M. sp.	Salem Borehole	Cysts	A dinoflagellate cyst, member of Dinophyceae.	
Mikrocysta	M. sp.	Salem Borehole	Cysts	A dinoflagellate cyst, member of Dollidiniaceae.	
Moesiodinium	M. cingulatum	Aselfingen; Gomaringen	Cysts	A dinoflagellate cyst from the family Heterocapsaceae.	
Morgenrothia	M. junior; M. tenera	Aselfingen; Gomaringen	Cysts	A dinoflagellate cyst from the family Heterocapsaceae.	
Nannoceratopsis	N. gracilis; N. senex; N. ridingii; N. tricornuta; N.deflandrei; N. triceras	Bisingen/Zimmern; Gomaringen; Salem Borehole	Cysts	A dinoflagellate cyst, member of Dinophyceae of the family Nannoceratopsiaceae. In the Lias Epsilon Interval (Lowermost Toarcian), most of the assemblages are dominated by Nannoceratopsis gracilis. Nannoceratopsis senex becomes highly abundant until the uppermost Tenuicostatum.	
Scriniocassis	S. weberi	Aselfingen; Gomaringen	Cysts	A dinoflagellate cyst from the family Scriniocassiaceae.	
Surculosphaeridium	S. longifurcatum	Dobenwohr Hafgraben	Cysts	A dinoflagellate cyst from the family Gonyaulacaceae.	
Susadinium	S. cristatum; S. flaccum; S. saetosum; S. scrofoides	Aselfingen; Gomaringen	Cysts	A dinoflagellate cyst from the family Heterocapsaceae.	
Parvocysta	P. nasuta	Aselfingen; Gomaringen	Cysts	A dinoflagellate cyst from the family Heterocapsaceae.	
Phallocysta	P. minuta	Aselfingen; Bisingen/Zimmern; Gomaringen	Cysts	A dinoflagellate cyst from the family Phallocysteae.	
Valvaeodinium	V. punctatum	Bisingen/Zimmern	Cysts	A dinoflagellate cyst from the family Comparodiniaceae.	

== Algae ==
The Posidonia Shale preserves an abundant variety of algae, such as the genus of colonial green algae Botryococcus, or the unicellular algal bodies Tasmanites, and other small examples. Algae are a good reference for changes on the oxygen conditions along the Toarcian.

=== Algal acritarchs ===
Genus	Species	Location	Material	Notes	Images
Cymatiosphaeropsis	C. punctiferus; C. stigmatus	Schandelah	Cysts	An acritarch probably of algal origin. Related to open shelf deposits	
Micrhystridium	M. inconspicuum; M. spinuliferum	Bisingen/Zimmern	Cysts	An acritarch probably of algal origin. Its fossils indicate nearshore or estuarine to shallow lagoon and/or slightly brackish-water environments.	
Pterosphaeridia	P. undulata; P. eisenackii; P. intersignata; P. nodosa; P. pachytheca	Schandelah; Salem Borehole	Cysts	An acritarch probably of algal origin. Related to open shelf deposits	
Veryhachium	V. brevispinum	Bisingen/Zimmern	Cysts	An acritarch probably of algal origin. It is abundant in most of the samples studied from the Sachrang Formation, being nearly the 50% of the acritarch fraction on some locations.	

=== Haptophyta ===
Genus	Species	Location	Material	Notes	Images
Biscutum	B. dubium; B. finchii; B. grandis; B. intermedium; B. novum; B. spp.	Laatzen; Schandelah; Sachrang; Unken	Coccoliths	Type member of the family Biscutaceae inside Parhabdolithaceae.	
Bussonius	B. leufuensis; B. prinsii; B. spp.	Laatzen; Schandelah; Sachrang; Unken	Coccoliths	A member of the family Watznaueriaceae inside Watznaueriales.	
Carinolithus	C. magharensis; C. poulnabronei; C. premagharensis; C. superbus	Holzmaden; Laatzen; Schandelah; Sachrang; Unken	Coccoliths	Member of the family Calyculaceae inside Parhabdolithaceae.	
Crepidolithus	C. cantabriensis; C. cavus; C. crassus; C. crucifer; C. granulatus; C. pliensbachiensis	Laatzen; Schandelah; Sachrang; Unken	Coccoliths	A member of the family Chiastozygaceae inside Eiffellithales.	
Diductius	D. constans	Laatzen; Schandelah	Coccoliths	Member of the family Parhabdolithaceae inside Stephanolithiales.	
Discorhabdus	D. criotus; D. ignotus; D. striatus	Laatzen; Schandelah; Sachrang; Unken	Coccoliths	Member of the family Biscutaceae inside Parhabdolithaceae.	
Lotharingius	L.barozii; L. crucicentralis; L. frodoi; L. hauffii; L. imprimus; L. primigenius; L. sigillatus; L. velatus	Holzmaden; Laatzen; Sachrang; Unken	Coccoliths	A member of the family Watznaueriaceae inside Watznaueriales.	
Mitrolithus	M. elegans; M. jansae; M. lenticularis	Laatzen; Schandelah	Coccoliths	A member of the family Parhabdolithaceae inside Stephanolithiales. The abundance drop of M. jansae further characterises the T-OAE perturbation, where it becomes the dominant genus in most of the Saxony Basin.	
Diductius	D. constans	Laatzen; Schandelah	Coccoliths	Member of the family Parhabdolithaceae inside Stephanolithiales.	
Orthogonoides	O. hamiltoniae	Laatzen; Schandelah	Coccoliths	incertae Sedis	
Schizosphaerella	S. punctulata	Laatzen; Schandelah; Sachrang; Unken	Coccoliths	Type member of the family Schizosphaerellaceae inside Parhabdolithaceae. Towards the Pliensbachian-Toarcian extincion this genus decreases in abundance and size.	
Similiscutum	S. cruciulus	Laatzen; Schandelah	Coccoliths	Member of the family Biscutaceae inside Podorhabdales.	
Sollasites	S. lowei	Sachrang; Unken	Coccoliths	Member of the family Biscutaceae inside Podorhabdales.	
Tubirhabdus	T. patulus	Laatzen; Schandelah; Sachrang; Unken	Coccoliths	A member of the family Chiastozygaceae inside Eiffellithales.	

=== Chlorophyta ===
Genus	Species	Location	Material	Notes	Images
Botryococcus	B. braunii; B. luteus	Schandelah; Hondelange	Cysts	Type member of the family Botryococcaceae inside Trebouxiales. This genus usually inhabits freshwater or deltaic environments.	Modern Botryococcus
Campenia	C. minor; C. gigas	Schandelah; Hondelange	Cysts	A member of Prasinophyceae. A genus common in green clays and other upper strata of the formation.	
Cymatiosphaera	C. areolata; C. densisepta; C. punctifera; C. stigmata; C. tecta; C. pachytheca	Bisingen/Zimmern; Schandelah; Hondelange	Cysts	A member of the family Pyramimonadales inside Prasinophyceae. Often found in basinal deposits.	
Dissiliodinium	D. giganteum	Schandelah; Hondelange	Cysts	A member of Gonyaulacaceae inside Dinophyceae.	
Granodiscus	G. granulatus	Schandelah; Hondelange	Cysts	A member of the Prasinophyceae. Often found in basinal deposits.	
Halosphaeropsis	H. liassica	Bisingen/Zimmern	Cysts	A member of the family Halosphaeraceae inside Chlorodendrales. Often found in basinal deposits.	
Lancettopsis	L. lanceolata	Schandelah; Hondelange	Cysts	A member of the Prasinophyceae. Often found in basinal deposits.	
Leiosphaera	L. globosa; L. deflandrei; L. pusilla	Bisingen/Zimmern; Schandelah; Hondelange	Cysts	A member of the Prasinophyceae. Often found in basinal deposits	
Nostocopsis	N. saprolithica	Schandelah; Hondelange	Cysts	A member of the Prasinophyceae. Often found in basinal deposits	
Palaeohystrichophora	P. infusorioides	Schandelah; Hondelange	Cysts	A member of Peridiniaceae inside Dinophyceae.	
Pleurozonaria	P. globulus; P. chondrota; P. concinna; P. digitata; P. distans; P. diversipora; P. macropora; P. media; P. polyporosa; P. spongiosa; P. stellulata; P. suevica; P. wetzelii	Schandelah; Hondelange	Cysts	A member of Prasinophyceae. It is the main genus present within silt and sand horizons, tending to be absent in shale layers.	
Scriniocassis	S. limbatus; S. limbicavatus; S. priscus	Schandelah; Hondelange	Cysts	A member of Dinophyceae.	
Tasmanites	T. mourai; T. tardus	Schandelah; Hondelange; Salem Borehole	Cysts	A member of Prasinophyceae. A genus common in green clays and other upper strata of the formation.	
Tytthodiscus	T. chondrotus; T. schandelahensis; T. suevicus; T. cf. suevicus	Schandelah; Hondelange	Cysts	A member of the Prasinophyceae. Often found in basinal deposits	

== Fungi ==
Fungal spores, hyphae and indeterminate remains are a rare element of the otherwise open marine deposits of the Posidonienschiefer formation, but were recovered at Dormettingen. These fungal remains are composed mostly of indeterminate spores and indicate oxygenated environments and suitable transportation by rivers.

=== Incertae sedis ===
Genus	Species	Location	Material	Notes	Images
Ostracoblabe	O. sp.	Holzmanden; Dotternhausen	Fungal patches in ammonite shells and belemnite rostra	A marine parasitoid fungus of uncertain relationship, linked with shells of marine invertebrates. The extant Ostracoblabe implexa is usually found associated with bivalve shells as an external parasitoid. Beyond this genus, other fungal remains include indeterminate endolithic fungi linked with microbial mats.	

== Ichnofossils ==
The major ichnological analyses of the Posidonian Shale come from Dotternhausen/Dormettingen, where the ichnogenus Phymatoderma formed the so-called Tafelfleins and Seegrasschiefer. The Tafelflein bed was deposited under anoxic bottom and pore water, where a recover of oxygen allow the Phymatoderma-producers return. The two organic-rich layers (Tafelfleins and Seegrasschiefer) are characterized by the dense occurrence of trace fossils such as Chondrites and Phymatoderma, done episodically due to the fall of the oxygen levels. The coeval more nearshore Swiss deposits referred Posidonian Shale (Rietheim Member) hosted similar trace fossils to those recovered on SW Germany. Ichnofossils in this setting apparently evolved faster to more oxic-to-dysoxic bottom waters. At Unken, laminated deposits of red limestone suggest well oxygenated active waters (as they lack shale), where high amounts of Chondrites are found.

Genus	Species	Location	Material	Made By	Images
Chondrites	C. bollensis; C. hechingensis; C. granulatus; C. furcatus; C. sp.; C.? sp.	Chalhac; Obereggenen im Breisgau; Aselfingen; Dotternhausen; Mössingen; Gomaringen; Reutlingen; Ohmenhausen; Altdorf; Oedhof; Mistelgau; Banz; Irlbach; Kerkhofen; Heiningen; Reichenbach; Wasseralfingen; Unterstürmig; Schandelah; Hondelange; Unken; Sachrang; Sazburg; Aselfingen; Fützen; Beggingen; Schieitheim; Siblingen; Rietheim; Staffelegg; Salhöf; Schafisheim	Burrowing and track ichnofossils	Annelids (Polychaeta); Sipuncula	Illustration of Chondrites bollensis
Gastrochaenolites	G. isp.	Schlierbach State Forest	Borings on bones	Bivalves	Example of Gastrochaenolites fossil
Planolites	P. montanus; P. ispp.	Banz; Dotternhausen; Holzmaden; Ohmden; Maurach; Hemmikon; Aselfingen; Fützen; Beggingen; Schieitheim; Siblingen; Rietheim; Staffelegg; Salhöf; Schafisheim	Burrowing and track ichnofossils.	Annelids (Polychaeta); Sipuncula	Example of Planolites fossil
Phymatoderma	P. granulata	Dotternhausen; Holzmaden	Burrowing and track ichnofossils.	Spionids; Holothurians; Spatangoids.	
Rhizocorallium	R. parallelum	Dotternhausen; Holzmaden; Ohmden; Altdorf; Banz	Burrowing and track ichnofossils	Decapoda; Annelids (Polychaeta); Sipuncula; Bony Fish; Dipnoi	specimens
Thalassinoides	T. sp.	Dotternhausen; Holzmaden; Ohmden; Altdorf; Banz; Aselfingen; Fützen; Beggingen; Schieitheim; Siblingen; Rietheim; Staffelegg; Salhöf; Schafisheim	Burrowing and track ichnofossils	Decapoda; Annelids (Polychaeta); Sipuncula; Bony Fish; Dipnoi	Thalassinoides found on the Sachrang Formation
Zoophycos	Z. sp.	Salzburg; Unken	Burrowing and track ichnofossils.	Polychaetes (Spionida and Carpitellida); Deposit-feeding Sipuncula	Example of Zoophycos fossil

== Invertebrata ==
=== Porifera ===
In the non-bituminous facies located on Obereggenen im Breisgau (Shore of the Black Forest High), especially the lower semicelatum subzone, pyritized individual needles of silica sponges (Demospongiae and Hexactinellida) are found, rarely on pelagic layers to very often on the low depth marine deposits. They are usually associated with radiolarian stone cores. In Dusslingen and Reutlingen, these sponge needles are sometimes barytized in phosphorites of the Haskerense subzone and are much more common here than in any other zone of the Lower Toarcian. These needles are absent in the bituminous horizons of the entire Lower Toarcian. Increased amounts of sponge needles (dominated by Hexactinellida) are also found on the arenaceous facies of the nearshore unit that is the Unken member, being the only section if its region hosts them, probably due to be an active and well oxygenated bottom. The location of this member as a possible bay on the south of the vindelician land probably allow to the development of more pre-Toarcian AOE conditions, hence the presence of biota otherwise rare on bituminous layers.

=== Annelida ===
Genus	Species	Location	Material	Notes	Images
Serpula	S. trigona; S. "sp. A"; S. "sp. B"; S. spp.	Banz; Aichelberg; Holzmaden; Dotternhausen; Holzmaden; Ohmden	Isolated Tubes	A sessile, marine annelid tube worm of the family Serpulidae. Presumably these specimens have fallen from their growth areas.	Example of modern Serpulid Tube
"Halla"	"H". tortitis; "H". sp.	Göppingen; Chalhac	Scolecodonts	A polychaete of the family Oenonidae inside Eunicida. Eunicidan species with prionognath jaws, absent in bituminous layers	

=== Lophophorata ===
==== Bryozoa ====
Genus	Species	Location	Material	Notes	Images
Berenicea	B. compressa	Heiningen	Colonial imprints	A Bereniceidae Stenolaematan. The colonies' form is extremely characteristic, forming curved fans	
Proboscina	P. liasica	Heiningen; Ohmenhausen	Colonial imprints	An Oncousoeciidae Stenolaematan. Colonies consists of bands that are the same width throughout their entire extent and can branch.	

==== Brachiopoda ====
Genus	Species	Location	Material	Notes	Images
Gibbirynchia	G. amalthei	Holzmaden; Aselfingen	Shells	A pennospiriferinid rhynchonellatan.	
Lingula	L. posidoniae	Hondelange; Holzmaden; Ohmden; Dotternhaussen	Shells	A Lingulidae rhynchonellatan. Associations of bioturbating infauna are dominated in certain sections by Palaeonucula/Lingula aggregations, developed under longer-term oxygenated conditions within the substrate and bottom waters.	
Orbiculoidea	O. papyracea	Hondelange; Holzmaden; Ohmden; Dotternhaussen	Shells	A Discinidae rhynchonellatan. This genus was found to have a planktotrophic larval stage that adapted while growing to the local redox boundary. When this fluctuated near the sediment–water interface and oxygen availability prevailed, it allowed benthic colonization. It is found in associations with Grammatodon and Pseudomytiloides.	
Rhynchonella	R.amalthei	Holzmaden; Dotternhaussen	Shells	A Rhynchonellidae rhynchonellatan. Found associated with Plicatula in long-term well-oxygenated conditions within the substrate and bottom waters.	
Spiriferina	S. villosa	Holzmaden; Dotternhaussen	Shells	A Spiriferinidae rhynchonellatan.	
Waldheimia	W. subdigona	Holzmaden; Ohmden; Dotternhaussen	Shells	A Terebratellidae rhynchonellatan.	

=== Mollusca ===
==== Bivalvia ====
Genus	Species	Location	Material	Notes	Images
Antiquilima	A. sp.	Dotternhausen	Shells	A Limidoid file clam.	
Bositra	B. buchii; B. radiata	All the Formation	Shells	A posidoniid ostreoidan. It is the type fossil of the Sachrang Formation. Originally it was named "Posidonia bronni", thought to be a new genus, and the strata were denominated the Posidonia layers after it. Years later it turned out to be a junior synonym of Bositra, and thus it was reassigned. However, the name of the layers was retained. The habitat and mode of life of Bositra has been debated for more than a century. There have been different interpretations, such as a pseudoplanktonic organism, a benthic organism living on the open marine floor, where it was the main inhabitant of the basinal settings, and a hybrid mode, where it had a life cycle with holopelagic reproduction controlled by changes in oxygen levels, and even a chemosymbiotic lifestyle with the large crinoid rafts being the main "safe havens" to evade anoxic events. Various hypotheses along the years led to a large study in 1998, where the size/frequency distribution, the density of growth through lines related to the shell size and the position of the redox boundary by total organic carbon diagrams revealed that Bositra probably had a benthic mode of life.	Thousands of specimens in one matrix
Camptonectes	C. subulatus	Altdorf; Dörlbach	Shells	A pectinoid scallop. The presence of this genus along endobenthic and epibenthic bivalves, which are absent farther up the section, suggest a delayed overstepping of anoxic bottom waters on the Altdorf High.	
Chlamys	C. priscus; C. sp.	Banz; Altdorf; Dörlbach; Mistelgau; Hondelange; Holzmaden; Ohmden; Gomaringen; Dotternhausen	Shells	A pectinoid scallop.	Single specimen
Cucullaea	C. (Idonearca) muensteri; C. sp.	Holzmaden; Dotternhausen	Shells	A cucullaeid clam.	
Eopecten	E. strionatis; E. tumidus; E. sp.	Banz; Altdorf; Mistelgau; Holzmaden; Ohmden; Gomaringen; Dotternhausen; Aselfingen	Shells	A pectinoid scallop.	
Exogyra	E. berthaudi	Holzmaden; Gomaringen; Dotternhausen	Shells	A gryphaeid mud oyster.	
Gervillella	G. lanceolata	Holzmaden; Dotternhausen	Shells	A bakevelliid mud oyster.	
Goniomya	G. rhombifera	Altdorf; Dörlbach; Hirschbühler Bach	Shells	A Pholadomyid clam	
Grammatodon	G. taylori; G. jurianus; G. sp.	Banz; Ludwig Canal; Hondelange; Pferdsfeld; Holzmaden; Ohmden; Gomaringen; Dotternhausen	Shells	A Grammatodontinae clam. This genus had a lecithotrophic and planktotrophic larval development.	
Gryphaea	G. arcuata	Holzmaden; Dotternhausen	Shells	A gryphaeid mud oyster.	Various specimens
Liostrea	L. falcifera; L. sp.	Dudelange; Hondelange; Holzmaden; Dotternhausen	Shells	A gryphaeid mud oyster.	Various specimens
Meleagrinella	M. substriata; M. (Praemeleagrinella) golberti; M. dubia	Banz; Altdorf; Dudelange; Salem; Mistelgau; Schlierbach; Hondelange; Grassel; Beienrode; Schandelah; Aichelberg; Staffelstein; Pferdsfeld; Oedhof; Holzmaden; Ohmden; Gomaringen; Dotternhausen; Dörnten; Langenbrücken; Aselfingen; Fützen; Beggingen; Schieitheim; Siblingen; Rietheim; Staffelegg; Salhöf; Schafisheim	Shells	An oxytomid scallop.	Colony of specimens
Mesomiltha	M. pumilus	Banz; Hondelange; Holzmaden; Dotternhausen	Shells	A lucinid clam.	
Mytiloides	M. amygdaloides	Banz; Altdorf; Mistelgau; Aichelberg; Holzmaden; Ohmden; Gomaringen; Dotternhausen	Shells	An inoceramid clam.	
Nicaniella	N. sp.	Altdorf; Dörlbach; Hirschbühler Bach	Shells	An Astartid clam	
Oxytoma	O. inequivalvis	Banz; Altdorf; Aichelberg; Holzmaden; Ohmden; Gomaringen; Dotternhausen	Shells	An oxytomid scallop.	
Palaeonucula	P. sp.	Altdorf; Dörlbach; Hirschbühler Bach	Shells	A Nuculid nut clam	
Parainoceramya	P. dubius; P. gryphaeoides; P. cinctus; P. cantianensis	Banz; Altdorf; Mistelgau; Hondelange; Aichelberg; Holzmaden; Ohmden; Gomaringen; Dotternhausen; Langenbrücken	Shells	An inoceramid clam.	Thousands of specimens on a single rock
Parvamussium	P. pumilum	Bettembourg-Dudelange	Shells	A Propeamussiidae scallop.	
Pinna	P. hartmanni	Holzmaden; Dotternhausen	Shells	A Pinnoid oyster.	
Plagiostoma	P. antiquata; P. cf. punctata	Banz; Hondelange; Holzmaden; Ohmden; Gomaringen; Dotternhausen	Shells	A Limidae file clam.	Plagiostoma giganteum, specimen multiview
Pleuromya	P. sp.	Altdorf; Dörlbach; Hirschbühler Bach	Shells	A Pleuromyid clam	
Plicatula	P. spinosa; P. sp.	Hondelange; Holzmaden; Ohmden; Gomaringen; Dotternhausen	Shells	A plicatulid mud scallop.	
Praearctotis	P. substriata; P. sp.	Dörlbach, Ludwig Canal	Shells	An oxytomid scallop. Found mostly in the "Dactylioceras-Monotis-Bank", a deposit derived from large scale tectonic events on the Bohemian coastline	
Propeamussium	P. pumilus; P. sp.	Hondelange; Holzmaden; Ohmden; Gomaringen; Dotternhausen	Shells	A propeamussiid mud scallop.	Various specimens on the same rock
Pseudolimea	P. acuticosta	Holzmaden; Dotternhausen	Shells	A Limidoid file clam.	
Pseudomytiloides	P. substriata; P. dubius; P. cinctus	Banz; Altdorf; Dörlbach; Dudelange; Mistelgau; Schlierbach; Hondelange; Grassel; Beienrode; Aichelberg; Staffelstein; Pferdsfeld; Holzmaden; Ohmden; Gomaringen; Dotternhausen; Dörnten; Langenbrücken	Shells	An inoceramid clam. Being the second most common genus of bivalve in the Formation, it has been subject to several studies in regards to its ecological niche, similar to Bositra. Several opinions include a pseudoplanktonic-only organism able to live in the open sea, or a benthic-only organism. Within the 1998 evaluation with Bositra, was found that this genus probably had a benthic juvenile stage that transitioned to a faculatively pseudoplanktonic adult.	Single specimen
Pteria	P. sp.	Dotternhausen	Shells	A Pteriidaeoid wing-oyster.	
Solemya	S. bollensis; S. voltzi	Banz; Altdorf; Mistelgau; Hondelange; Aichelberg; Holzmaden; Ohmden; Gomaringen; Dotternhausen	Shells	A Clam, type member of the family Solemyidae inside Solemyida.	Single specimen
Steinmannia	S. bronni; S. radiata	Dudelange; Hondelange; Holzmaden; Ohmden; Gomaringen; Dotternhausen	Shells	A "posidoniid" ostreoidan. Another Genera mistaken with "Posidonia bronni".	Various specimens in one matrix
Unicardium	U. bollense	Hondelange; Holzmaden; Ohmden; Gomaringen; Dotternhausen	Shells	A mactromyid clam.	

==== Gastropoda ====
Genus	Species	Location	Material	Notes	Images
Amberleya	A. imbricata	Aichelberg; Dotternhausen	Shells	A Eucyclidae sea snail.	
Coelodiscus	C. minutus; C. biumbilicatus; C. fluegeli	Banz; Altdorf; Mistelgau; Hondelange; Schandelah; Bamberg; Trimeusel; Hetzles; Oedhof; Holzmaden; Ohmden; Gomaringen; Dotternhausen; Dörnten; Langenbrücken	Shells	A coelodiscid sea snail. Is the oldest known holoplanktonic gastropod and the most abundant snail in the formation, thanks to a bilaterally symmetrical shell as an adaption to active swimming.	Reconstruction
Eucyclus	E. capitaneus	Holzmaden; Dotternhausen	Shells	A Eucyclidae sea snail.	specimens
Natica	N. pelops; N. reticulata	Aichelberg; Holzmaden; Ohmden; Dotternhausen	Shells	A Naticidae moon snail.	Extant specimen
Pleurotomaria	P. anglica; P. sp.	Banz; Aichelberg; Holzmaden; Dotternhausen	Shells	A Pleurotomariidae sea snail.	specimen
Pterotrachea?	P.? liassica; P.? ceratophagus	Altdorf; Hetzles; Trimeusel; Bamberg; Mistelgau	Shells	A possible pterotracheid sea Slug. Dubious affinity.	Modern specimen
Rhabdocolpus	R.? cf. brandi; R. cf. vetustus	Holzmaden; Dotternhausen	Shells	A Procerithiidae sea snail.	
Rigauxia	R. hiltermanni	Dotternhausen	Shells	A snail of uncertain placement.	
Tatediscus	T. aratus	Banz; Altdorf; Mistelgau; Aichelberg; Schandelah; Holzmaden; Ohmden; Gomaringen; Dotternhausen; Dörnten	Shells	A coelodiscid sea snail. Possible holoplanktonic gastropod.	
Zygopleura	Z. undulata	Dotternhausen	Shells	A zygopleurid sea snail.	specimens

==== Cephalopoda ====
Genus	Species	Location	Material	Notes	Images
Alocolytoceras	A. sp. aff. dorcadis	Mössingen; Ohmden; Dotternhausen	Shells	A lytoceratid ammonite.	
Anaptychus	A. latexcisus	Dotternhausen; Dormettingen; Mögglingen; Boll; Holzmaden; Ohmden; Aselfingen; Maurach; Hemmikon	Aptychi	Ammonite internal moulds of uncertain affinity.	
Acrocoelites	A. longiconus; A. trisulculosus; A. oxyconus; A. ilminstrensis; A. dorsalis; A. voltzi; A. pyramidalis; A. glaber; A. raui; A. riegrafi; A. levidensis; A. vulgaris; A. tripartitus	Schouweiler; Dudelange-Bettembourg; Foetz; Chalhac; Obereggenen im Breisgau; Aselfingen; Dotternhausen; Mössingen; Gomaringen; Reutlingen; Ohmenhausen; Altdorf; Oedhof; Mistelgau; Banz; Irlbach; Kerkhofen; Heiningen; Reichenbach; Wasseralfingen; Unterstürmig; Schandelah; Hondelange; Unken; Sachrang; Sazburg; Berge westlich der Trettach; Haglertal, Höhe; Klammgraben; Pfronten, Engetal valley; Aselfingen; Fützen; Beggingen; Schieitheim; Siblingen; Rietheim; Staffelegg; Salhöf; Schafisheim; Hemmikon; Bascharage	Phragmocones	A megateuthidid belemnite.	
Belotheutis	B. subcostata	Holzmaden	Various complete and nearly complete specimens	A diplobelid coleoid. Some specimens instead belong to Clarkeiteuthis (=Phragmoteuthis) conocauda.	
Brodieia	B. sp.	Blumberg-Achdorf; Asfelfingen	Pyritized fragments	A phymatoceratid ammonite.	
Calliphylloceras	C. pompeckji	Irlbach; Kerkhofen; Heiningen; Reichenbach	Shells	A phylloceratid ammonite.	
Catacoeloceras	C. crassum; C. engeli; C. marioni; C. jordani; C. raquinianum	Banz; Altdorf; Oedhof; Mistelgau; Aichelberg; Schandelah	Shells	A dactylioceratid ammonite.	
Catulloceras	C. dumortieri	Banz; Altdorf; Oedhof; Mistelgau; Aichelberg	Shells	A hildoceratid ammonite.	
Cenoceras	C. intermedium; C. spp.	Holzmaden; Ohmden; Mistlegau; Irlbach	Shells	A nautilid. Two referred specimens, identified as Nautilus spp. from Holzmaden were found encrusted with Serpulids and Bryozoans.	Nautilidae shell from Banz, probably Cenoceras
Chitinobelus	C. acifer	Holzmaden; Ohmden	Phragmocones	A belemnotheutid belemnite. Chitinobelus rostrum was composed of aragonite with organic material, while normal belemnites had calcite.	
Chondroteuthis	C. wunnenbergi	Banz; Altdorf; Oedhof; Mistelgau; Aichelberg; Schandelah; Dotternhausen; Holzmaden; Ohmden; Aselfingen; Maurach; Hemmikon; Bascharage	Phragmocones	A belemnotheutid belemnite.	
Clarkeiteuthis	C. conocauda	Dotternhausen; Holzmaden	Various complete and nearly complete specimens	A diplobelid coleoid	Clarkeiteuthis Holzmaden specimen
Cleviceras	C. exaratum; C. elegans	Bächental basin; Hondelage	Shells	A hildoceratid ammonite	
Coeloceras	C. crassum; C. mucronatum	Banz; Altdorf; Mistelgau; Aichelberg; Schandelah; Dotternhausen; Holzmaden; Ohmden; Maurach; Hemmikon; Bascharage	Shells	Type genus of Coeloceratidae.	
Collina	C. mucronata	Banz; Altdorf; Oedhof; Mistelgau; Aichelberg; Schandelah	Shells	A dactylioceratid ammonite. It is common within the bituminous marls (incorrectly designated as "Wilder Schiefer").	
Cornaptychus	C. sanguinolarius; C. bullatus; C. elasma; C. ovatus; C. cuneatus; C. striatolaevis; C. elegans; C. striatopunctatus; C. lythensis; C. sublythensis; C. latolythensis; C. transiens; C. stenolythensis; C. stenelasma; C. elasmoides	Pfronten, Engetal valley; Sachrang; Banz; Altdorf; Bamberg; Oedhof; Mistelgau; Aichelberg; Schandelah; Hondelange; Irlbach; Dotternhausen; Dormettingen; Mögglingen; Boll; Holzmaden; Ohmden; Aselfingen; Maurach; Hemmikon; Bascharage; Unken	Aptychi	Ammonite internal moulds of uncertain affinity.	Cornaptychus lythensis
Cotteswoldia	C. distans; C. lotharingica; C. mactra; C. subcompta; C. fluitans	Banz; Altdorf; Mistelgau; Aichelberg; Schandelah; Dotternhausen; Holzmaden; Ohmden; Aselfingen; Maurach; Hemmikon; Bascharage	Shells	A hildoceratid ammonite.	
Cuspiteuthis	C. tubularis; C. trivialis; C. acuaria	Dudelange-Bettembourg; Foetz; Rodange; Esch/Alzette	Phragmocones	A megateuthidid belemnite.	
Dactylioceras	D. semiannulatum; D.semicelatum; D. crassifactum; D. cf. crassiusculosum; D. tenuicostatum; D. wunnenbergi; D. crosbeyi; D. clevelandicum; D. ernsti; D. vermis; D. athleticum; D. annulatum; D. commune; D. anguinum; D. rarestriatum	Chalhac; Obereggenen im Breisgau; Aselfingen; Gomaringen; Reutlingen; Dotternhausen; Mössingen; Ohmenhausen; Altdorf; Oedhof; Mistelgau; Banz; Irlbach; Kerkhofen; Heiningen; Reichenbach; Wasseralfingen; Unterstürmig; Schandelah; Hondelange; Unken; Sachrang; Sazburg; Haglertal, Höhe; Klammgraben; Pfronten, Engetal valley; Aselfingen; Fützen; Beggingen; Schieitheim; Siblingen; Rietheim; Staffelegg; Salhöf; Schafisheim; Hemmikon; Bascharage	Shells	A dactylioceratid ammonite.	Dactyliocerascommune on Holzmaden
Dactyloteuthis	D. wrighti; D. inaudita; D. digitalis; D. semistriata; D. irregularis; D. similis; D. incurvata	Banz; Altdorf; Oedhof; Mistelgau; Aichelberg; Schandelah; Dotternhausen; Holzmaden; Ohmden; Aselfingen; Maurach; Hemmikon; Bascharage	Phragmocones	A megateuthidid belemnite.	
Denckmannia	D. malagma	Banz; Altdorf; Oedhof; Mistelgau	Shells	A phymatoceratid ammonite.	
Eleganticeras	E. exaratum; E. elegantulum	Hondelange; Banz; Altdorf; Oedhof; Mistelgau; Aichelberg; Schandelah; Dotternhausen; Holzmaden; Ohmden; Maurach; Hemmikon; Bascharage	Shells	A hildoceratid ammonite.	
Erycites	E. labrosus	Banz; Altdorf; Oedhof; Mistelgau; Aichelberg	Shells	A hammatoceratid ammonite.	
Frechiella	F. subcarinata	Dotternhausen; Altdorf; Dörlbach; Hirschbühler Bach	Shells	A hildoceratid ammonite. The co-occurrence in Altdorf of boreal (Pseudolioceras) and Tethyan faunal elements (Frechiella) is striking, suggesting clear connection with both regions.	
Furloceras	F. cf. escheri	Dotterhausen; Holzamden; Zell	Shells	A phymatoceratid ammonite.	
Geopeltis	G. simplex; G. emarginata	Holzmaden; Ohmden; Banz	Various complete and nearly complete specimens	A geopeltid loligosepiid (Vampyromorpha). Related to the modern vampire squid. Gladius with weakly arcuated hyperbolar zones.	Geopeltis specimen
Geotheutis	G. bollensis	Dotternhausen; Holzmaden; Ohmden; Schandelah	Various complete and nearly complete specimens	A possible early Cuttlefish. It is one of the most important cephalopod fossils in the Sachrang Formation, due to having some of the earliest examples of pigments found on any species, also one of the first historically. The pigments are preserved on various specimens with Eumelanin related to its ink sacs and including even phosphatized musculature.	
Harpoceras	H. falciferum; H. nitescens; H. subplanatum; H. falciferum; H. serpentinum; H. renevieri; H. cf. exaratum; Harpoceras sp.	Chalhac; Obereggenen im Breisgau; Reutlingen; Dotternhausen; Mössingen; Gomaringen; Ohmenhausen; Altdorf; Oedhof; Mistelgau; Banz; Irlbach; Kerkhofen; Heiningen; Reichenbach; Wasseralfingen; Unterstürmig; Schandelah; Hondelange; Unken; Sachrang; Sazburg; Haglertal, Höhe; Pfronten, Engetal valley; Fützen; Beggingen; Schieitheim; Siblingen; Rietheim; Staffelegg; Salhöf; Schafisheim; Hemmikon; Bascharage	Shells	A hildoceratid ammonite.	Harpoceras specimen
Haugia	H. variabilis; H. illustris; H. jugosa	Banz; Altdorf; Oedhof; Mistelgau; Aichelberg; Schandelah; Irlbach	Shells	A phymatoceratid ammonite.	
Hildaites	H. murleyi; H. levisoni; H. subserpentinum	Hondelange; Dotternhausen; Dormettingen	Shells	A hildoceratid ammonite.	
Hildoceras	H. levisoni; H. serpentinum; H. subserpentinum; H.propeserpentinum; H. kiliani; H. douvillei; H. sublevisoni; H. semipolitum; H. bifrons; H. bodei	Chalhac; Obereggenen im Breisgau; Aselfingen; Gomaringen; Reutlingen; Dotternhausen; Mössingen; Ohmenhausen; Altdorf; Oedhof; Mistelgau; Banz; Irlbach; Kerkhofen; Heiningen; Reichenbach; Wasseralfingen; Unterstürmig; Schandelah; Hondelange; Unken; Sachrang; Sazburg; Haglertal, Höhe; Klammgraben; Pfronten, Engetal valley; Fützen; Beggingen; Schieitheim; Siblingen; Rietheim; Staffelegg; Salhöf; Schafisheim; Hemmikon; Bascharage	Shells	A hildoceratid ammonite.	Hildoceras specimen
Hudlestonia	H. serrodens; H. affinis	Banz; Altdorf; Oedhof; Mistelgau; Aichelberg	Shells	A hildoceratid ammonite.	
Jeletzkyteuthis	J. coriaceus	Banz; Dotternhausen; Dudelange-Bettembourg; Holzmaden; Ohmden	Various complete and nearly complete specimens	A loligosepiid loligosepiidan (Vampyromorpha). Related to the modern vampire squid. Gladii of Loligosepia can be distinguished from Jeletzkyteuthis by the transition lateral field/hyperbolar zone.	
Kedonoceras	K. cf. compactum	Dotternhausen; Dormettingen	Shells	A dactylioceratid ammonite.	
Lioteuthis	L. problematica	Holzmaden	Single specimen with tissue	Type genus of Lioteuthididae inside Vampyromorphida. The taxonomic position of Lioteuthis is uncertain, although the fins reaching the proximal gladius section and the smooth median field suggest affinity to the Prototeuthididae	
Lobolytoceras	L. siemensi	Hondelage; Dormettingen; Dotternhausen	Shells	A lytoceratid ammonite.	
Loligosepia	L. aalensis; L. sp.	Banz; Dotternhausen; Dudelange-Bettembourg; Bascharage; Holzmaden; Ohmden; Schandelah	Various complete and nearly complete specimens	A loligosepiid loligosepiidan (Vampyromorpha). The Loligosepiidae are believed to be ancestral to the modern vampire squid, Vampyroteuthis infernalis. Hooklets in food residues in the posterior mantle indicate that Loligosepia preyed upon belemnites.	Loligosepia Holzmaden specimen
Lytoceras	L. ceratophagum; L. onychograptum; L. cornucopia; L. sublineatum; L. germaini; L. crenatum; L. metorchion; L. mucronatum; L. fimbriatum	Pfronten, Engetal valley; Banz; Altdorf; Oedhof; Mistelgau; Aichelberg; Schandelah; Irlbach; Dotternhausen; Dormettingen; Mögglingen; Boll; Holzmaden; Ohmden; Aselfingen; Mauracht; Hemmikon; Bascharage	Shells	A lytoceratid ammonite. Lytoceras is relatively big, reaching nearly 50 cm in diameter.	
Mercaticeras	M. forte; M. cf. mercati; M. aff. umbilicatum; M. dilatum	Banz; Altdorf; Oedhof; Mistelgau; Aichelberg; Schandelah; Dotternhausen; Mögglingen; Holzmaden; Ohmden	Shells	A hildoceratid ammonite.	Mercaticeras specimen
Micropassaloteuthis	M. fistulata	Dotternhausen; Holzmaden; Ohmden; Aselfingen; Schömberg; Gomaringen; Hüttlingen; Frommern; Aalen-Reichenbach	Phragmocones	A passaloteuthidid belemnite.	
Mucrodactylites	M. mucronatus; M. clapierensis	Blumberg	Shells	A dactylioceratine ammonite.	
Nodicoeloceras	N. crassoides; N. acanthus; N. crassescens; N. dayi	Dotternhausen; Blumberg/Achdorf; Mössingen; Ohmden; Dürnau; Zell	Shells	A dactylioceratid ammonite.	
Neolioceratoides	N. infidum	Dotternhausen; Dormettingen	Shells	A hildoceratid ammonite.	
Odontobelus	O. tripartitus	Dotternhausen; Holzmaden	Various complete and nearly complete specimens	A diplobelid coleoid. Has been confused with Acrocoelites tripartitus, hence the species name.	
Onychites	O. amalthei; O. runcinatus	Hechingen; Holzmaden; Ohmden; Gomaringen	Hooks	Incertae sedis belemnites.	
Orthildaites	O. becaudi	Dotternhausen; Mössingen	Shells	A hildoceratid ammonite.	
Osperleioceras	O. bicarinatum	Dotternhausen	Shells	A hildoceratid ammonite	
Pachylytoceras	P. hircinum; P. cf. hircinum; P. torulosum; P. wrighti; P. dilucidum	Banz; Altdorf; Oedhof; Mistelgau; Aichelberg	Shells	A lytoceratid ammonite.	
Parabelopeltis	P. flexuosa	Bascharage; Dudelange-Bettembourg; Holzmaden; Ohmden	Various complete and nearly complete specimens	A geopeltid loligosepiidan (Vampyromorpha). Related to the modern vampire squid. It is distinguished from Geoteuthis and Loligosepia by its median rib: this rib forms a narrow ridge between two narrow grooves. Probably bore fins similar to modern Vampyroteuthis.	
Paroniceras	P. sternale; P. cf. sternale	Klammgraben; Pfronten, Engetal valley	Shells	A hildoceratid ammonite	
Paraplesioteuthis	P. sagittata; P. hastata	Holzmaden	Partial specimens with tissue	A plesioteuthidid prototeuthidinan (Vampyromorpha). was originally described as "Geoteuthis" sagittata.	
Passaloteuthis	P. paxillosa; P. bisulcata	Banz; Altdorf; Oedhof; Mistelgau; Aichelberg; Schandelah; Dotternhausen; Holzmaden; Ohmden; Aselfingen; Maurach; Hemmikon; Bascharage	Various complete and nearly complete specimens	A passaloteuthidid belemnite.	Passaloteuthis Holzmaden specimen
Peronoceras	P. fibulatum; P. turriculatum; P.?n. sp. aff. perarmatum; P. andrsi; P. vortex; P. millavense; P.s subarmatum; P. cf. subarmatum	Dotternhausen; Gomaringen; Hechingen; Mössingen; Frommern; Zell; Boll; Aalen; Klammgraben; Pfronten, Engetal valley	Shells	A dactylioceratine ammonite.	
Phylloceras	P. heterophyllum; P. plicatum; P. supraliasicum; P. nilssoni; P. cf. heterophyllum; P. pompeckji	Chalhac; Obereggenen im Breisgau; Aselfingen; Gomaringen; Reutlingen; Dotternhausen; Mössingen; Ohmenhausen; Altdorf; Oedhof; Mistelgau; Banz; Irlbach; Kerkhofen; Heiningen; Reichenbach; Wasseralfingen; Unterstürmig; Schandelah; Hondelange; Unken; Sachrang; Sazburg; Haglertal, Höhe; Klammgraben; Pfronten, Engetal valley; Fützen; Beggingen; Schieitheim; Siblingen; Rietheim; Staffelegg; Salhöf; Schafisheim; Hemmikon; Bascharage	Shells	A phylloceratid ammonite. The largest ammonite found in the Posidonienschiefer comes from the Ohmden quarry, and is a specimen of Phylloceras heterophyllum with a diameter of 87 cm.	Phylloceras restoration
Phlyseogrammoceras	P. dispansum; P. cf. dispansiforme	Banz; Altdorf; Oedhof; Mistelgau; Aichelberg	Shells	A hildoceratid ammonite.	
Phymatoceras	P. lilli; P. rude; P. escheri; P. anomalum; P. ex gr. binodatum	Dotterhausen; Holzamden; Zell; Dudelange-Zoufftgen; Holzgau-Lermooser Mulde; Anstehenden	Shells	A phymatoceratid ammonite.	
Polyplectus	P. capellinus; P. bicarinatus	Göppingen; Frickenhausen; Heiningen; Großbettlinggen; Holzeim; Balingen; Haglertal, Höhe; Pfronten, Engetal valley	Shells	A hildoceratid ammonite	
Porpoceras	P. vortex; P. verticosum	Dotternhausen	Shells	A dactyloceratine ammonite.	
Protogrammoceras	P. paltum	Bereich	Shells	A hildoceratid ammonite.	
Pseudogrammoceras	P. bingmanni	Banz; Altdorf; Oedhof; Mistelgau; Aichelberg	Shells	A hildoceratid ammonite.	
Pseudolioceras	P. lythense; P. leptophyllum; P. compactile; P. discoides	Pfronten, Engetal valley; Banz; Altdorf; Dörlbach; Hirschbühler Bach; Oedhof; Mistelgau; Aichelberg; Schandelah; Dotternhausen	Shells	A hildoceratid ammonite.	
Salpingoteuthis	S. trisulcata; S. persulcata; S. bauhini; S. longisulcata; S. macra; S. tessoniana; S. dorsetiensis; S. blomenhofensis	Banz; Altdorf; Oedhof; Mistelgau; Aichelberg; Schandelah; Dotternhausen; Holzmaden; Ohmden; Aselfingen; Maurach; Hemmikon; Bascharage	Phragmocones	A salpingoteuthidid belemnite.	Salpingoteuthis specimen
Simoniteuthis	S. michaelyi	NE of Bascharage	MNHNL TI024, complete specimen	A loligosepiid loligosepiidan (Vampyromorpha).	
Simpsonibelus	S. dorsalis; S. lentus	Banz; Altdorf; Oedhof; Mistelgau; Aichelberg; Schandelah; Dotternhausen; Holzmaden; Ohmden; Aselfingen; Maurach; Hemmikon; Bascharage	Phragmocones	A belemnotheutid belemnite.	
Sueviteuthis	S. schlierbachensis; S. zellensis	Dotternhausen; Holzmaden; Ohmden	Various complete and nearly complete specimens	A sueviteuthidid coleoid. Sueviteuthis had at least six arms with rather simple hooks, similar to the present of the genus Phragmoteuthis.	
Teudopsis	T. bollensis; T. subcostata; T. schubleri	Aselfingen; Banz; Dotternhausen; Bascharage; Dudelange-Bettembourg; Ehlerange; Holzmaden; Ohmden	Various complete and nearly complete specimens	A teudopsine palaeololiginid (Vampyromorphida).	Teudopsis Ohmden specimen
Tiltoniceras	T. antiquum; T. costatum; T. acutum; T. schroederi; T.capillatum	Dotternhausen; Gomaringen; Aselfingen; Altdorf; Mistelgau; Banz; Irlbach; Kerkhofen; Schandelah; Hondelange; Hemmikon; Bascharage	Shells	A hildoceratid ammonite.	Tiltoniceras specimen
Trachylytoceras	T. annulosum	Dotternhausen	Shell	A lytoceratid ammonite.	
Youngibelus	Y. tubularis; Y. gigas; Y. giganteus; Y. ohmdenensis; Y. simpsoni	Banz; Altdorf; Oedhof; Mistelgau; Aichelberg; Schandelah; Dotternhausen; Holzmaden; Ohmden; Aselfingen; Maurach; Hemmikon; Bascharage	Phragmocones	A megateuthidid belemnite. Includes very large specimens	Youngibelus Reconstruction
Zugodactylites	Z. thompsoni	Mössingen	Shells	A dactylioceratid ammonite.	

=== Cyclida ===
Genus	Species	Location	Material	Notes	Images
Juracyclus	J. posidoniae	Gomaringen	Incomplete carapace	The first cyclidan arthropod from the Jurassic, from the family Halicynidae inside Cycloidea.	Juracyclus Reconstruction

=== Oligostraca ===
Genus	Species	Location	Material	Notes	Images
Bairdia	B. ohmerti; B. thuringica; B. donzei; B. cf. carinata; B. rostrata; B. aselfingensis; B. hahni; B. inflata	Chalhac; Obereggenen; Aselfingen; Dotternhaueen; Mössingen; Gomaringen; Reutlingen; Ohmenhausen; Göppingen; Heiningen; Reichenbach; Untereturmig.	Valves	A marine ostracod of the family Bairdiidae inside Bairdioidea.	
Bairdiacypris	B. dorisae; B. faba	Chalhac; Aselfingen; Mössingen; Ohmenhausen; Heiningen; Reichenbach; Wasseralfingen	Valves	A marine ostracod of the family Bairdiidae inside Bairdioidea.	
Cytherella	C. praecadomensis; C. toarcensis	Ohmenhausen; Wasseralfingen	Valves	A marine ostracod of the family Cytherellidae inside Platycopida.	
Cytherelloidea	C. anningi; C. praecadomensis	Aselfingen; Achdorf; Weilheim/Teck	Valves	A marine ostracod of the family Cytherellidae inside Platycopida.	
Eucytherura	E. angulocostata	Hammerstadt; Achdorf	Valves	A marine ostracod of the family Cytheruridae inside Podocopida.	
Hermiella	H. cincta; H. comes; H. klingleri	Mössingen; Gomaringen; Reutlingen	Valves	A marine ostracod of the family Healdiidae inside Podocopida.	
Infracytheropteron	I. groissi; I. gwashense; I. rarum; I. atafastigatum	Chalhac; Aselfingen; Mössingen; Gomaringen; Ohmenhausen; Heiningen, Reichenbach; Wasseralfingen; Unterstürmig	Valves	A marine ostracod of the family Protostomia.	
Kinkelinella	K. procera; K. costata; K. cf. persica; K. tenuicostati; K. champeauae; K. sermoisensis; K. costata; K. debilis; K. (Ektyphocythere) n. sp.	Chalhac; Aselfingen; Achdorf; Ohmenhausen; Dotternhausen; Mössingen; Gomaringen; Heiningen; Göppingen; Hammerstadt; Reichenbach; Wasseralfingen; Unterstürmig	Valves	A marine ostracod of the family Protocytheridae inside Podocopida.	
Liasina	L. lanceolata	Chalhac; Aselfingen; Dotternhausen; Mössingen; Gomaringen; Reutlingen; Ohmenhausen; Heiningen	Valves	A marine ostracod, member of the family Pontocyprididae inside Podocopida.	
Macrocypris	M. liassica; M. sp. A; M. sp. B	Chalhac; Aselfingen; Dotternhausen; Mössingen; Gomaringen; Ohmenhausen; Weilheim/Teck; Heiningen; Göppingen; Reichenbach; Wasseralfingen	Valves	A marine ostracod, member of the family Macrocyprididae inside Podocopida.	
Monoceratina	M. striata; M. scrobiculata; M. atimulea; M. seebergensis; M. frentzeni; M. vulsa	Chalhac; Achdorf; Häufig; Aselfingen; Dotternhausen; Mössingen; Gomaringen; Reutlingen; Ohmenhausen; Heiningen; Reichenbach; Weilheim/Teck	Valves	A marine ostracod of the family Bythocytheridae inside Cladocopina.	
Ogmoconcha	O. rotunda; O. amalthei; O. ambo; O. intercedens; O. circumvallata; O. amalthei; O. impressa; O.? contractula; O.? conversa; O. sp.	Chalhac; Häufig in Obereggenen; Aselfingen; Gomaringen; Reutlingen; Dotternhausen; Mössingen; Gomaringen, Reutlingen; Ohmenhausen; Heiningen; Reichenbach; Wasseralfingen; Unterstürmig	Valves	A marine ostracod, member of the family Healdiidae inside Podocopida.	
Ogmoconchella	O. impressa; O. propinqua; O. conversa	Chalhac; Aselfingen; Dotternhausen; Mössingen; Gomaringen; Ohmenhausen; Heiningen; Göppingen; Reichenbach; Wasseralfingen	Valves	A marine ostracod of the family Healdiidae inside Podocopida.	
Polycope	P. tenuireticulata; P. pelta; P. cf. cerasia; P. cincinnata; P. plumhoffi	Achdorf; Aselfingen; Dotternhausen; Mössingen; Gomaringen; Reutlingen; Ohmenhausen; Heiningen; Göppingen, Reichenbach	Valves	A marine ostracod of the family Polycopidae inside Cladocopina.	
Praeschuleridea	P. tenera; P. gallemannica; P. aspera	Achdorf; Ohmenhausen; Dotternhausen; Mössingen; Gomaringen; Heiningen; Göppingen; Hammerstadt	Valves	A marine ostracod of the family Praeschuleridea inside Podocopida.	
Pseudohealdia	P.gruendeli; P. truncata	Mössingen; Gomaringen; Ohmenhausen; Heiningen; Göppingen	Valves	A marine ostracod of the family Healdiidae inside Podocopida.	
Trachycythere	T. tubulosa; T. verrucosa	Ohmenhausen; Wasseralfingen	Valves	A marine ostracod, incertae sedis inside Podocopida.	

=== Malacostraca ===
Genus	Species	Location	Material	Notes	Images
Acanthochirana	A. krausei	Dörnten, north of Goslar, opencast mine Fischerköpfe	Various complete and nearly complete specimens	An aegerid decapod.	
Achelata indet.	Indeterminate	Gomaringen	Single complete specimen in late larval stage	The specimen reported represents the oldest fossil record of an achelate larva. This larva shares similarities with the late Jurassic genus Cancrinos.	
Antrimpos	A. sp.; cf. A. sp.	Gomaringen; Schandelah	Various complete and nearly complete specimens	A penaeid decapod.	Antrimpos specimen
Coleia	C. theodorii; C. moorei; C. sinuata	Holzmaden; Ohmden; Gomaringen; Dotternhausen; Banz	Various complete and nearly complete specimens	An erymid decapod.	
Eryma	E. amalthei; E. spp.	Holzmaden; Ohmden; Gomaringen; Dotternhausen; Banz	Various complete and nearly complete specimens	Type genus of the family Erymidae. Originally was placed within Glyphea as G. amalthei, informally used by Quenstedt and housed in the Museum Naturkunde in Württemberg. A series of later revisions proved it was a different genus.	Eryma specimen
Gabaleryon	G. "sp. 1"; G. "sp. 2"	Gomaringen; Pfronten, Engetal valley	Various complete and nearly complete specimens	A coleiid decapod. Was confused with Proeryon hartmanni specimens. Specimens from Gomaringen are the first known with preserved ommatidia.	
Glypheopsis	G. grandichela	Gomaringen	Isolated Chelae	A decapod of the family Glypheidae.	
Mecochirus	M. eckerti	Langenbrücken	Various complete and nearly complete specimens	A decapod of the family Mecochiridae.	
Penaeus	P. sp.	Schandelah	Partial specimens.	A penaeid decapod.	
Palaeastacus	P. sp.	Holzmaden; Ohmden; Gomaringen; Dotternhausen	Various complete and nearly complete specimens	An erymid decapod.	Palaeastacus specimen
Palaeopagurus	P. sp.	Dotternhausen	Single specimen inside an ammonite shell.	A hermit crab of the family Paguridae. This specimen was found inside an ammonite shell, probably looking to evade anoxic conditions or predators.	
Palinurina	P. longipes; P. tenera	Schandelah; Holzmaden; Gomaringen	Various complete and nearly complete specimens	A spiny lobster of the family Palinuridae	
Proeryon	P. giganteus; P. hauffi; P. hartmanni; P. laticaudatus	Holzmaden; Ohmden; Dotternhausen; Gomaringen; Banz; Schandelah; Altdorf; Hemmikon; Nancy	Various complete and nearly complete specimens	A coleiid decapod. The second largest decapod from the formation, P. giganteus, reaches a larger size than most other polychelidans, growing up to 15 cm.	Proeryon giganteus
Stenodactylina	S. liasina	Holzmaden	Single Chela	An erymid decapod. It was erroneously reported from the Late Toarcian.	
Stomatopoda? indet.	Indeterminate	Holzmaden	Single Incomplete specimen	A possible mantis shrimp.	
Tonneleryon	T. schweigerti	Holzmaden	Various complete and nearly complete specimens	A gregarious polychelidan Lobster. specimens of Tonneleryon schweigerti were recovered generally in clusters of several individuals, due to that and the disposition of the specimens these probably represent mass-mortality assemblages and suggest this species was gregarious.	
Uncina	U. posidoniae; U. alpina	Holzmaden; Ohmden; Gomaringen; Pfronten, Engetal valley	Various complete and nearly complete specimens	An astacidean decapod of the family Uncinidae. Uncina posidoniae is among the largest known Jurassic crustaceans andis also the largest representative of the genus.	The Largest complete Uncina posidoniae specimen, with 44 cm long.

=== Thecostraca ===
Genus	Species	Location	Material	Notes	Images
Toarcolepas	T. mutans	Aichelberg	Numerous disarticulated individuals, associated with fossil wood.	A phosphatic-shelled barnacle of the family Eolepadidae. Toarcolepas is provisionally interpreted as the oldest epiplanktonic barnacle known, and is thought to have lived attached to floating driftwood.	Modern genus Lepas is among the closest related taxa to Toarcolepas

=== Arachnida ===
Genus	Species	Location	Material	Notes	Images
Liassoscorpionides	L. schmidti	Hondelage, Braunschweig	Single incomplete specimen.	The type genus of the family Liassoscorpionididae, probably related to Mesophonoidea.	While not closely related, Liassoscorpionides was morphologically similar to extant Hadogenes

=== Insecta ===
==== Incertae sedis ====
Insects are common terrestrial animals that were probably washed into the sea due to monsoon conditions present on the Sachrang Formation.

Genus	Species	Location	Material	Notes	Images
Agmatozoon	A. articulatum	Grassel, Braunschweig	Multiple specimens	Incertae sedis	
Campeulites	C. cylindricus	Flechtorf near Fallersleben (Elegans)	Multiple specimens	Incertae sedis	
Cricolia	C. inflexa	Hondelage, Braunschweig	Multiple specimens	Incertae sedis	
Dimeretes	D. oculatus	Schandelah, nr Braunschweig (Bode coll.)	Multiple specimens	Incertae sedis	
Elasmoscolex	E. hamatus	Flechtorf near Fallersleben (Elegans)	Multiple specimens	Incertae sedis	
Epimetrophora	E. recta	Hondelage, Braunschweig (Boreale Zone)	Multiple specimens	Incertae sedis	
Griphoconion	G. tenuistriatum	Hondelage, Braunschweig	Multiple specimens	Incertae sedis	
Oocephalina	O. mutilata	Hondelage, Braunschweig (Boreale Zone)	Multiple specimens	Incertae sedis	
Platycorion	P. utroquelaesum	Hondelage, Braunschweig (Boreale Zone)	Multiple specimens	Incertae sedis	
Tomeferusa	T. abdita	Flechtorf near Fallersleben (Elegans)	Multiple specimens	Incertae sedis	
Trimerocephalium	T. incisum	Grassel, Braunschweig	Multiple specimens	Incertae sedis	

==== Notoptera ====
Genus	Species	Location	Material	Notes	Images
Geinitzia	G. latrunculorum; G. varia; G. superaucta; G. perlaesa; G. fasciata; G. dorni	Hondelage, Braunschweig; Beienrode, Fletchtorf; Grassel, Braunschweig	Multiple specimens	Grylloblattidans of the family Geinitziidae.	Extant member of Grylloblattidae, Posidonia genera were probably similar
Roemerula	R. maculosa	Hondelage, Braunschweig	Multiple specimens	Grylloblattidans of the family Geinitziidae.	Extant member of Grylloblattidae, Posidonia genera were probably similar

==== Eoblattida ====
Genus	Species	Location	Material	Notes	Images
Dorniella	D. pulchra	Hondelage, Braunschweig; Beienrode, Fletchtorf; Grassel, Braunschweig	Multiple specimens	An Eoblattidan of the family Blattogryllidae.	

==== Odonatoptera ====
Genus	Species	Location	Material	Notes	Images
Protomyrmeleon	P. grasselensis; P. brunonis	Grassel, Braunschweig; Bascharage	Multiple specimens	An Odonatopteran (ancient winged insects) from the family Protomyrmeleontidae.	

==== Odonata ====
Genus	Species	Location	Material	Notes	Images
Campterophlebia	C. elegans	Schandelah, nr Braunschweig	Multiple specimens	A dragonfly of the family Campterophlebiidae. The largest Early Jurassic insect known, with a wingspan up to 20 cm.	
Elattogomphus	E. latus	Hondelage, Braunschweig	Multiple specimens	A dragonfly of the family Liassogomphidae.	
Ensphingophlebia	E. undulata	Grassel, Braunschweig; Hondelage, Braunschweig	Multiple specimens	A dragonfly of the family Sphenophlebiidae.	
Gallodorsettia	G. kronzi	A13 motorway construction, south of Foetz	Multiple specimens	A dragonfly of the family Campterophlebiidae.	
Henrotayia	H. marci	Bascharage	Multiple specimens	A dragonfly of the family Henrotayiidae.	
Heterothemis	H. brodiei	Holzmaden; Schandelah; Beienrode; Hondelage, Braunschweig; Hattorf, Fallersleben; Schandelah, nr Braunschweig; Hemmikon; Bascharage	Multiple specimens	A dragonfly of the family Heterophlebiidae.	
Heterophlebia	H. buckmani	Holzmaden; Beienrode; Grassel, Braunschweig; Hondelage, Braunschweig; Hattorf, Fallersleben; Schandelah, nr Braunschweig; Bascharage; Kerkhofen	Multiple specimens	A dragonfly of the family Heterophlebiidae.	
Liassostenophlebia	L. germanica	Rhine-Danube canal, Km 112	Multiple specimens	Incertae sedis	
Mesoepiophlebia	M. veronicae	Bascharage; Sanem	Multiple specimens	A dragonfly of the family Sphenophlebiidae.	
Myopophlebia	M. libera	Hondelage, Braunschweig; Grassel, Braunschweig; Beienrode; Bascharage	Multiple specimens	A dragonfly of the family Myopophlebiidae.	
Necrogomphus	N.brunswigae	Schandelah, nr Braunschweig	Multiple specimens	A dragonfly of the family Liassogomphidae.	
Paraheterophlebia	P. wunnenbergi; P. marcusi	Hondelage, Braunschweig; Grassel, Braunschweig; Flechtorf near Fallersleben; Bascharage	Multiple specimens	A dragonfly of the family Myopophlebiidae.	
Paraplagiophlebia	P. loneuxi	Bascharage	Multiple specimens	A dragonfly of the family Myopophlebiidae.	
Phthitogomphus	P. angulatus	Hondelage, Braunschweig; Grassel, Braunschweig; Luxguard quarry	Multiple specimens	A dragonfly of the family Liassogomphidae.	
Plagiophlebia	P. praecostarea	Hondelage, Braunschweig; Hattorf, Fallersleben; Schandelah, nr Braunschweig	Multiple specimens	A dragonfly of the family Heterophlebiidae.	
Proinogomphus	P. bodei; P. kreuzerorum	Hondelage, Braunschweig; Hattorf, Fallersleben; Bascharage	Multiple specimens	A dragonfly of the family Liassogomphidae.	
Sphenophlebia	S. interrupta; S. pommerana	Hondelage, Braunschweig; Kerkhofen	Multiple specimens	A dragonfly of the family Sphenophlebiidae.	
Strongylogomphus	S. grasselianus	Hondelage, Braunschweig; Grassel, Braunschweig; Bascharage	Multiple specimens	A dragonfly of the family Myopophlebiidae.	
Syrrhoe	S. commissa	Grassel, Braunschweig	Multiple specimens	Incertae sedis	

==== Orthoptera ====
Genus	Species	Location	Material	Notes	Images
Acridiopsis	A. spoliata	Hattorf, Fallersleben	Multiple specimens	A short-horned grasshopper of the family Acrididae.	Extant member of Acrididae, Acridiopsis was probably similar
Chresmodella	C. fissa	Hondelage, Braunschweig; Hattorf, Fallersleben	Multiple specimens	A stick insect of the family Aerophasmidae.	
Elcana	E. minima; E. geinitzi	Kerkhofen	Multiple specimens	A grasshopper of the family Elcanidae.	
Liadolocusta	L. ornata	Hondelage, Braunschweig	Multiple specimens	Grasshoppers of the family Locustopsidae.	
Liassogrylloides	L. basifastigatus	Hondelage, Braunschweig	Multiple specimens	Incertae sedis	
Locustopsis	L. procera; L. bernstorffi; L. maculosa; Locustopsis sp.	Hattorf, Fallersleben; Schandelah, near Braunschweig	Multiple specimens	Grasshoppers of the family Locustopsidae.	
Panorpidium	P. media; P. geinitzi; P. minima	Between Sehlde & Ringelheim; Hondelage, Braunschweig; Grassel, Braunschweig; Beienrode, Fletchtorf; Hattorf, Fallersleben; Schandelah, nr Braunschweig; Flechtorf near Fallersleben	Multiple specimens	A grasshopper of the family Elcanidae.	Panorpidium geinitzi reconstruction
Prophilaenites	P. hondelagensis	Hondelage, Braunschweig	Multiple specimens	Incertae sedis	
Protogryllus	P. formosus; P. hattorfensis; P. praeacutus; P. symmetricus; P. multoramosus; P. multovenosus; P. laceratus; P. foliolum; P. implicatus; P. fissus; P. minor	Hondelage, Braunschweig; Grassel, Braunschweig; Hattorf, Fallersleben; Schandelah, nr Braunschweig	Multiple specimens	A grasshopper of the family Protogryllidae.	
Schesslitziella	S. haupti; S. integra	Feuermühlenberg near Scheßlitz; Hondelage, Braunschweig; Grassel, Braunschweig; Bamberg; Kerkhofen	Multiple specimens	A stick insect of the family Aerophasmidae.	

==== Dictyoptera ====
Genus	Species	Location	Material	Notes	Images
Blattula	B. langfeldti	Schandelah, near Braunschweig; Hattorf, Fallersleben	Multiple specimens	A cockroach of the family Blattulidae.	
Caloblattina	C. mathildae	Schandelah, near Braunschweig; Hondelage, Braunschweig; Beienrode, Fletchtorf	Multiple specimens	A cockroach of the family Caloblattinidae.	
Liadoblattina	L. blakei	Holzmaden; Grassel, Braunschweig; Schandelah, near Braunschweig; Hattorf, Fallersleben	Multiple specimens	A cockroach of the family Raphidiomimidae.	
Mesoblattina	M. protypa	Mistelgau	Multiple specimens	A cockroach of the family Mesoblattinidae.	
Ptyctoblattina	P. simplicior; P. dilatata	Grassel, Braunschweig; Beienrode	Multiple specimens	A cockroach of the family Raphidiomimidae.	

==== Hemiptera ====
Genus	Species	Location	Material	Notes	Images
Archijassus	A. heeri	Hattorf, Fallersleben	Multiple specimens	A Planthopper of the family Archijassidae.	
Compactofulgoridium	C. fronterotundum; C. obesum; C. aries; C. decapitatum; C. concameratum; C. paenintegrum	Schlewecke am Harz; Hondelage, Braunschweig; Grassel, Braunschweig	Multiple specimens	Planthoppers of the family Fulgoridiidae.	
Corynecoris	C. occultatus; C. semigranulatus	Grassel, Braunschweig; Hattorf, Fallersleben	Multiple specimens	A shore bug (Saldidae) of the family Archegocimicidae.	
Deraiocoris	D. insculptus	Schandelah, near Braunschweig	Multiple specimens	A shore bug (Saldidae) of the family Archegocimicidae.	
Elasmoscelidium	E. rectemarginatum; E. promotum; E. boreale	Hondelage, Braunschweig; Grassel, Braunschweig; Schandelah, near Braunschweig	Multiple specimens	Incertae sedis	
Ensphingocoris	E. parvulus; E. praerotundatus	Grassel, Braunschweig; Hattorf, Fallersleben	Multiple specimens	A shore bug (Saldidae) of the family Archegocimicidae.	Extant member of Saldidae, Archegocimicidae genera were probably similar
Entomecoris	E. minor; E. morator	Hondelage, Braunschweig; Hattorf, Fallersleben	Multiple specimens	A shore bug (Saldidae) of the family Archegocimicidae.	Extant member of Saldidae, Archegocimicidae genera were probably similar
Eogerridium	E. gracile	Schandelah, near Braunschweig	Multiple specimens	A shore bug (Saldidae) of the family Archegocimicidae.	Extant member of Saldidae, Archegocimicidae genera were probably similar
Engynabis	E. tenuis	Hondelage, Braunschweig	Multiple specimens	A shore bug (Saldidae) of the family Archegocimicidae.	Extant member of Saldidae, Archegocimicidae genera were probably similar
Eurynotis	E. incisus	Beienearode, Fletchtorf	Multiple specimens	A shore bug (Saldidae) of the family Archegocimicidae.	Extant member of Saldidae, Archegocimicidae genera were probably similar
Fulgoridium	F. mancomarginatum; F. semiperspicuum; F. cubitoramosum; F. cuneiforme; F. infuscatum; F. paulodilatatum; F. exiguemaculatum; F. reduncum; F. fallerslebense; F. hattorfense; F. gottingense; F. tenuimaculatum; F. incurvatum; F. praeobtusum; F. raromaculatum; F. cubitofurcatum; F. basilaesum; F. hondelanum; F. fabri; F. hildesheimense; F. symmetricum; F. latius; F. balticum; F. posidonicum; F. silvaticum	Hondelage, Braunschweig; Grassel, Braunschweig; Flechtorf near Fallersleben; Hattorf, Fallersleben; Schandelah, near Braunschweig; Trirneusel; Staffelstein; Pferdsfeld; Aselfingen; Kerkhofen	Multiple specimens	Planthoppers of the family Fulgoridiidae.	Extant member of Fulgoridae, Fulgoridiidae genera where probably similar
Fulgoridulum	F. egens	Beienearode, Fletchtorf; Hondelage, Braunschweig	Multiple specimens	Planthoppers of the family Fulgoridiidae.	Extant member of Fulgoridae, Fulgoridiidae genera where probably similar
Indutionomarus	I. treveriorum	Bommelscheier industrial area	Multiple specimens	A coleorrhynchan of the family Progonocimicidae.	
Liassoprogonocimex	L. bascharagensis	Bascharage	Multiple specimens	A coleorrhynchan of the family Progonocimicidae.	
Macropterocoris	M. obtusus	Hondelage, Braunschweig	Multiple specimens	A Shore bug (Saldidae) of the family Archegocimicidae.	
Margaroptilon	M. formosum; M. cuneatum; M. paucisinuatum; M. detruncatum; M. procerum	Grassel, Braunschweig; Hattorf, Fallersleben	Multiple specimens	Planthoppers of the family Fulgoridiidae.	
Megalocoris	M. laticlavus	Grassel, Braunschweig	Multiple specimens	Saldidae Incertae sedis	
Metafulgoridium	M. praetruncatum; M. spatulaeforme	Hondelage, Braunschweig; Hattorf, Fallersleben	Multiple specimens	Planthoppers of the family Fulgoridiidae.	
Ophthalmocoris	O. liassicus	Hondelage, Braunschweig	Multiple specimens	A shore bug (Saldidae) of the family Archegocimicidae.	
Procercopis	P. lacerata; P. abscissa; P. wunnenbergi	Beienearode, Fletchtorf; Grassel, Braunschweig; Hondelage, Braunschweig	Multiple specimens	A froghopper of the family Procercopidae.	
Procerofulgoridium	P. verticillatum; P. praefastigatum	Hondelage, Braunschweig; Grassel, Braunschweig; Schandelah, near Braunschweig	Multiple specimens	Planthoppers of the family Fulgoridiidae.	
Productofulgoridium	P. filiferum; P. praeacutum	Hondelage, Braunschweig	Multiple specimens	Planthoppers of the family Fulgoridiidae.	
Pronabis	P. utroquelaesus	Schandelah, near Braunschweig	Multiple specimens	A shore bug (Saldidae) of the family Archegocimicidae.	
Somatocoris	S. conservatus	Beienearode, Fletchtorf	Multiple specimens	A shore bug (Saldidae) of the family Archegocimicidae.	
Tetrafulgoria	T. parallelogramma	Hondelage, Braunschweig; Grassel, Braunschweig	Multiple specimens	Planthoppers of the family Fulgoridiidae.	
Xulsigia	X. karetsa	Bommelscheier industrial area	Multiple specimens	A sternorrhynchan of the family Pincombeomorpha. Has been proposed to be within its own family, Xulsigiidae.	

==== Hymenoptera ====
Genus	Species	Location	Material	Notes	Images
Liadobracona	L. raduhna	Schandelah	Multiple specimens	A wasp of the family Ephialtitidae.	
Pseudoxyelocerus	P. bascharagensis	Bascharage	Multiple specimens	A wood wasp of the family Xyelotomidae.	Extant member of Tenthredinoidea, Posidonia genera were probably similar
Symphytopterus	S. liasinus	Schandelah, near Braunschweig	Multiple specimens	A wasp of the family Ephialtitidae.	
Thilopterus	T. lampei	Schandelah	Multiple specimens	A wasp of the family Ephialtitidae.	
Xyelula	X. benderi	Misltelgau; Schandelah, near Braunschweig	Multiple specimens	A cephoidean of the family Sepulcidae.	Extant member of Cephoidea, Posidonia genera were probably similar

==== Neuroptera ====
Genus	Species	Location	Material	Notes	Images
Actinophlebia	A. abscissa	Hondelage, Braunschweig	Multiple specimens	A lacewing of the family Prohemerobiidae.	
Actinoptilon	A. violatum	Hondelage, Braunschweig	Multiple specimens	A silky lacewing of the family Psychopsidae.	Extant member of Psychopsidae, Posidonia genera where probably similar
Epipanfilovia	E. fasciata	Hondelage, Braunschweig	Multiple specimens	A lacewing of the family Panfiloviidae.	
Glottopteryx	G. multivenosa	Hondelage, Braunschweig	Multiple specimens	A lacewing of uncertain placement.	
Liassopsychops	L. curvata	Hondelage, Braunschweig; Hattorf, Fallersleben; Grassel, Braunschweig; Schandelah, nr Braunschweig; Kerkhofen	Multiple specimens	A giant lacewing of the family Kalligrammatidae. It is one of the oldest known representatives of the giant pollinator lacewings.	
Mesosmylina	M. exornata	Hondelage, Braunschweig	Multiple specimens	Lance lacewings of the family Osmylidae.	Extant member of Osmylidae, Posidonia genera were probably similar
Mesopsychopsis	M. liasina	Hondelage, Braunschweig	Multiple specimens	A lance lacewing of the family Osmylopsychopidae.	
Ophtalmogramma	O. klopschari	Schandelah, nr Braunschweig	Multiple specimens	A giant lacewing of the family Kalligrammatidae.	
Panfilovia	P. fasciata	Hondelange; Schandelah; Kerkhofen	Multiple specimens	A lacewing of the family Panfiloviidae. A large genus with wings around 50 mm.	
Paractinophlebia	P. grasselensis; P. tenuis; P. acuta	Hondelage, Braunschweig; Grassel, Braunschweig	Multiple specimens	A lacewing of the family Prohemerobiidae.	
Parhemerobius	P. multostriatus; P. dilatatus; P. bodei	Hondelage, Braunschweig; Grassel, Braunschweig; Schandelah, near Braunschweig	Multiple specimens	A lacewing of the family Prohemerobiidae.	
Prohemerobius	P. prodromus; P. quatuorpictus; P. septemvirgatus; P. mediolatus	Hondelage, Braunschweig; Grassel, Braunschweig; Hattorf, Fallersleben; Schandelah, nr Braunschweig	Multiple specimens	A lacewing of the family Prohemerobiidae.	
Protoaristenymphes	P. bascharagensis	Bascharage	Multiple specimens	A lance lacewing of the family Mesochrysopidae.	
Stenoteleuta	S. lingulaeformis	Hondelage, Braunschweig	Multiple specimens	A lacewing of the family Prohemerobiidae.	
Tetanoptilon	T. brunsvicense	Hondelage, Braunschweig	Multiple specimens	Lance lacewings of the family Osmylidae. Tetanoptilon is the largest non-kalligrammatid lacewing of the Jurassic.	

==== Hemiptera ====
Genus	Species	Location	Material	Notes	Images
Adelocoris	A. ambiguus	Grassel, Braunschweig	Multiple specimens	Pentatomomorphans of the family Pachymeridiidae. Related with the group Lygaeoidea, possibly being ancestral to them.	Extant member of Lygaeoidea, Posidonia genera where probably similar
Engerrophorus	E. nitidus	Schandelah, nr Braunschweig	Multiple specimens	Pentatomomorphans of the family Pachymeridiidae. Related with the group Lygaeoidea, possibly being ancestral to them.	Extant member of Lygaeoidea, Posidonia genera where probably similar
Euraspidium	E. granulosum	Hondelage, Braunschweig	Multiple specimens	Pentatomomorphans of the family Pachymeridiidae. Related with the group Lygaeoidea, possibly being ancestral to them.	Extant member of Lygaeoidea, Posidonia genera where probably similar
Ischnocoris	I. bitoratus	Hondelage, Braunschweig	Multiple specimens	Pentatomomorphans of the family Pachymeridiidae. Related with the group Lygaeoidea, possibly being ancestral to them.	Extant member of Lygaeoidea, Posidonia genera where probably similar
Liassocicada	L. mueckei; L. antecedens	Rhine-Danube canal, Km 112; Beienrode	Multiple specimens	A Hairy Cicada of the family Tettigarctidae.	Extant member of Tettigarctidae, Posidonia genera were probably similar
Liassotettigarcta	L. mueckei	Kerkhofen	Multiple specimens	A Hairy Cicada of the family Tettigarctidae.	Extant member of Tettigarctidae, Posidonia genera were probably similar
Mesomphalocoris	M. obtusus	Hondelage, Braunschweig	Multiple specimens	Pentatomomorphans of the family Pachymeridiidae.	
Stiphroschema	S. longealatum	Grassel, Braunschweig	Multiple specimens	Pentatomomorphans of the family Pachymeridiidae.	
Trachycoris	T. abbreviatus	Hondelage, Braunschweig	Multiple specimens	Pentatomomorphans of the family Pachymeridiidae.	

==== Coleoptera ====
Genus	Species	Location	Material	Notes	Images
Amblycephalonius	A. tenuistriatus	Hondelage, Braunschweig; Grassel, Braunschweig	Multiple specimens	Beetles of the family Coptoclavidae.	
Amphoxyne	A. lineata; A. minuta	Hondelage, Braunschweig; Beienrode; Grassel, Braunschweig	Multiple specimens	Incertae sedis	
Aposphinctus	A. conservatus; A. striatus	Hondelage, Braunschweig; Beienrode; Grassel, Braunschweig	Multiple specimens	A water scavenger beetle of the family Hydrophilidae.	Extant member of Hydrophilidae, Posidonia genera were probably similar
Apicasia	A. inolata	Schlewecke am Harz	Multiple specimens	Incertae sedis	
Apiopyrenides	A. trigeminus	Hondelage, Braunschweig	Multiple specimens	Incertae sedis	
Aptilotitus	A. capitecarens	Grassel, Braunschweig	Multiple specimens	Incertae sedis	
Auchenophorites	A. sculpturatus	Hondelage, Braunschweig	Multiple specimens	Incertae sedis	
Brachylaimon	B. striatus	Grassel, Braunschweig	Multiple specimens	Incertae sedis	
Brachytrachelites	B. striatus	Hondelage, Braunschweig	Multiple specimens	Incertae sedis	
Camaricopterus	C. ovalis	Grassel, Braunschweig	Multiple specimens	A beetle of the family Phoroschizidae.	
Coreoeicos	C. dilatatus	Beienrode	Multiple specimens	False ground beetles of the family Trachypachidae.	
Diatrypamene	D. collinus; D. angulocollis; D. excavata	Hondelage, Braunschweig	Multiple specimens	Incertae sedis	
Dicyphelus	D. concameratus	Hondelage, Braunschweig	Multiple specimens	Incertae sedis	
Diphymation	D. corrosum	Hondelage, Braunschweig	Multiple specimens	Incertae sedis	
Diplocelides	D. minutus	Grassel, Braunschweig	Multiple specimens	Incertae sedis	
Diplothece	D. scissa	Hondelage, Braunschweig	Multiple specimens	Incertae sedis	
Entomocantharus	E. convexus	Hondelage, Braunschweig	Multiple specimens	Incertae sedis	
Episcepes	E. rotundatus	Hondelage, Braunschweig	Multiple specimens	Incertae sedis	
Eurynotellus	E. brevicollis	Hondelage, Braunschweig	Multiple specimens	Incertae sedis	
Eurysphinctus	E. latesulcatus	Hondelage, Braunschweig	Multiple specimens	Incertae sedis	
Eusarcantarus	E. compactus	Hondelage, Braunschweig	Multiple specimens	Incertae sedis	
Grasselites	G. pusillus	Grassel, Braunschweig	Multiple specimens	Incertae sedis	
Gastrodelus	G. decapitatus	Hondelage, Braunschweig	Multiple specimens	Incertae sedis	
Gastroratus	G. dispertitus	Grassel, Braunschweig	Multiple specimens	Incertae sedis	
Hydroicetes	H. affictus	Schandelah, nr Braunschweig	Multiple specimens	Incertae sedis	
Laimocenos	L. striatogranulatus	Hondelage, Braunschweig	Multiple specimens	Incertae sedis	
Leptomites	L. procerus	Hondelage, Braunschweig	Multiple specimens	Incertae sedis	
Leptosolenophorus	L. brevicollis	Grassel, Braunschweig	Multiple specimens	Incertae sedis	
Loxocamarotus	L. virgatus	Hondelage, Braunschweig	Multiple specimens	Incertae sedis	
Macrotrachelites	M. longus	Hondelage, Braunschweig	Multiple specimens	Incertae sedis	
Megachorites	M. brevicollis	Grassel, Braunschweig; Volkmarsdorf, Braunschweig	Multiple specimens	Incertae sedis	
Melanocantharis	M. bicornuta	Hondelage, Braunschweig	Multiple specimens	Incertae sedis	
Metanastes	M. denudatus	Grassel, Braunschweig	Multiple specimens	Incertae sedis	
Mesoncus	M. striatulus	Grassel, Braunschweig	Multiple specimens	Incertae sedis	
Mesotylites	M. marginatus	Hondelage, Braunschweig	Multiple specimens	Incertae sedis	
Omogongylus	O. ovatus	Grassel, Braunschweig	Multiple specimens	Incertae sedis	
Ooidellus	O. denudatus	Hondelage, Braunschweig	Multiple specimens	Incertae sedis	
Ooperiglyptus	O. contractus	Hondelage, Braunschweig	Multiple specimens	Incertae sedis	
Ooperioristus	O. applanatus	Hondelage, Braunschweig	Multiple specimens	Beetles of the family Coptoclavidae.	
Opiselleipon	O. gravis	Hondelage, Braunschweig	Multiple specimens	Incertae sedis	
Oxycephalites	O. curculioides	Hondelage, Braunschweig	Multiple specimens	Incertae sedis	
Palaeotrachys	P. laticollis	Schlewecke am Harz	Multiple specimens	Incertae sedis	
Parnosoma	P. detectum	Hondelage, Braunschweig	Multiple specimens	Incertae sedis	
Peridosoma	P. praecisum	Grassel, Braunschweig	Multiple specimens	Incertae sedis	
Pholipheron	P. articulatus; P. armatus; P. ovatus	Schandelah, nr Braunschweig	Multiple specimens	Incertae sedis	
Proheuristes	P. striatus	Hondelage, Braunschweig	Multiple specimens	Incertae sedis	
Prosynactus	P. gracilis; P. scissus; P. procerus	Hondelage, Braunschweig; Beienrode, Fletchtorf; Grassel, Braunschweig; Schandelah, nr Braunschweig	Multiple specimens	False ground beetles of the family Trachypachidae.	Extant member of Trachypachidae, Posidonia genera were probably similar
Pleuralocista	P. insculpta	Grassel, Braunschweig	Multiple specimens	Incertae sedis	
Rhomaleus	R. ornatus	Grassel, Braunschweig	Multiple specimens	Incertae sedis	
Rhysopsalis	R. distorta	Beienrode	Multiple specimens	Incertae sedis	
Sphaericites	S. concameratus	Hondelage, Braunschweig	Multiple specimens	Incertae sedis	
Tetragonides	T. magnus	Hondelage, Braunschweig	Multiple specimens	Incertae sedis	
Trichelepturgetes	T. procerus	Hondelage, Braunschweig	Multiple specimens	Incertae sedis	
Trochmalus	T. compressus	Hondelage, Braunschweig	Multiple specimens	Incertae sedis	
Scalopoides	S. inscissus	Grassel, Braunschweig	Multiple specimens	Incertae sedis	
Sideriosemion	S. punctolineatum	Grassel, Braunschweig	Multiple specimens	Incertae sedis	
Sphaerocantharis	S. striata; S. defossa	Grassel, Braunschweig; Beienrode	Multiple specimens	Incertae sedis	
Syntomopterus	S. latus	Beienrode	Multiple specimens	Incertae sedis	
Tripsalis	T. praecisa	Grassel, Braunschweig	Multiple specimens	Incertae sedis	
Trochiscites	T. capitapertus	Grassel, Braunschweig	Multiple specimens	Incertae sedis	
Tolype	T. rotundata	Beienrode	Multiple specimens	Incertae sedis	
Zetemenos	Z. sexlineatus	Grassel, Braunschweig	Multiple specimens	Incertae sedis	

==== Amphiesmenoptera ====
Genus	Species	Location	Material	Notes	Images
Necrotaulius	N. parvulus; N. obtusior	Holzmaden; Kerkhofen; Trirneusel; Staffelstein; Pferdsfeld; Hattorf, Fallersleben; Schandelah, near Braunschweig; Hondelage, Braunschweig; Grassel, Braunschweig	Multiple specimens	An Amphiesmenopteran of the family Necrotauliidae. The ovipositor terminalia of female N. parvulus indicate that these insects laid their eggs in soil rather than in water.	
Micropterygidae indet.	Indeterminate	Hattorf, Fallersleben; Hattorf, Fallersleben; Schandelah, near Braunschweig; Schandelah, near Braunschweig; Hondelage, Braunschweig; Grassel, Braunschweig	Multiple specimens	Lepidopterans probably related with the family Micropterygidae. Compared with their record in Grimmen, in Lower Saxony lepidopterans are rather scarce and badly preserved.	Extant member of Micropterygidae, Posidonia genera were probably similar

==== Ephemeroptera ====
Genus	Species	Location	Material	Notes	Images
Geisfeldiella	G. benkerti	Bamberg	Multiple specimens	Mayfly of the family Protereismatidae.	

==== Mecoptera ====
Genus	Species	Location	Material	Notes	Images
Haplobittacus	H. parvus	Grassel, Braunschweig	Multiple specimens	A hangingfly of the family Bittacidae.	
Mesobittacus	M. clavaeformis; M. minutus; M. marginelaesus	Hondelage, Braunschweig; Beienrode, Fletchtorf	Multiple specimens	A hangingfly of the family Bittacidae.	
Mesopanorpa	M. obtusa; M. formosa	Hondelage, Braunschweig; Beienrode	Multiple specimens	A scorpionfly of the family Orthophlebiidae.	
Neorthophlebia	N. maculipennis	Hondelage, Braunschweig	Multiple specimens	A hangingfly of the family Bittacidae.	
Orthophlebia	O. latipennisimilis; O. fallerslebensis; O. diminuta; O. brunsvicensis; O. speciosa; O. compacta; O. elongata	Hondelage, Braunschweig; Schandelah, nr Braunschweig; Grassel, Braunschweig; Flechtorf near Fallersleben; Hattorf, Fallersleben; Große Kley, Mörse	Multiple specimens	A scorpionfly of the family Orthophlebiidae.	
Parabittacus	P. lingula	Hondelage, Braunschweig; Grassel, Braunschweig; Hattorf, Fallersleben; Hattorf, Fallersleben	Multiple specimens	A hangingfly of the family Bittacidae.	
Parorthophlebia	P. grasselensis	Grassel, Braunschweig; Hattorf, Fallersleben	Multiple specimens	Scorpionflies of the family Orthophlebiidae.	
Pleobittacus	P. retroflexus	Hondelage, Braunschweig	Multiple specimens	A hangingfly of the family Bittacidae.	
Protobittacus	P. desacuminatus; P. arculatus	Hondelage, Braunschweig; Grassel, Braunschweig; Hattorf, Fallersleben	Multiple specimens	A hangingfly of the family Bittacidae.	Extant member of Bittacidae, Posidonia genera were probably similar
Protorthophlebia	P. cuneata	Hondelage, Braunschweig	Multiple specimens	Scorpionflies of the family Protorthophlebiidae.	
Pseudopolycentropus	P. obtusus	Grassel, Braunschweig; Hattorf, Fallersleben; Kerkhofen	Multiple specimens	Scorpionflies of the family Pseudopolycentropodidae.	
Reprehensa	R. acuminata	Schandelah, nr Braunschweig	Multiple specimens	Scorpionflies of the family Orthophlebiidae.	

==== Raphidioptera ====
Genus	Species	Location	Material	Notes	Images
Hondelagia	H. reticulata	Hondelage, Braunschweig	Multiple specimens	A snakefly of the family Priscaenigmatidae.	
Metaraphidia	M. vahldieki	Schandelah	Multiple specimens	A snakefly of the family Metaraphidiidae.	

==== Diptera ====
Genus	Species	Location	Material	Notes	Images
Amblylexis	A. gibberata	Grassel, Braunschweig	Multiple specimens	Incertae sedis	
Amianta	A. eurycephala	Grassel, Braunschweig	Multiple specimens	Incertae sedis	
Amphipromeca	A. acuta	Hattorf, Fallersleben	Multiple specimens	Incertae sedis	
Apistogrypotes	A. inflexa	Hattorf, Fallersleben	Multiple specimens	Incertae sedis	
Archipleciomima	A. germanica	Große Kley, Mörse	Multiple specimens	Incertae sedis	
Architipula	A. bodeisimilis; A. ptychopteraeformis; A. formosa; A. basiminuta; A. robusta; A. clara; A. bodei; A. brunsvicensis; A. analiramosa; A. aequabilis; A. fragmentosa; A. veris; A. latealata	Hondelage, Braunschweig; Hattorf, Fallersleben; Grassel, Braunschweig; Schandelah, nr Braunschweig; Große Kley, Mörse	Multiple specimens	A crane fly of the family Limoniidae.	Extant member of Limoniidae, Posidonia genera were probably similar
Bodephora	B. arucaeformis	Hattorf, Fallersleben	Multiple specimens	Incertae sedis	
Culiciscolex	C. gibberatus	Grassel, Braunschweig	Multiple specimens	Incertae sedis	
Cyrtomides	C. maculatus	Flechtorf near Fallersleben	Multiple specimens	Incertae sedis	
Ellipibodus	E. laesa	Grassel, Braunschweig	Multiple specimens	Incertae sedis	
Eoptychoptera	E. simplex; E. liasina; E. eximia	Hondelage, Braunschweig; Grassel, Braunschweig; Flechtorf near Fallersleben; Große Kley, Mörse; Kerkhofen	Multiple specimens	A phantom crane fly of the family Eoptychopterinae.	
Empidocampe	E. retrocrassata	Hondelage, Braunschweig	Multiple specimens	Incertae sedis	
Haplotipula	H. majalis; H. cubitoramosa	Hondelage, Braunschweig; Hattorf, Fallersleben	Multiple specimens	A crane fly of the family Limoniidae.	
Heterorhyphus	Heterorhyphus analivarius; Heterorhyphus anomalus	Grassel, Braunschweig	Multiple specimens	A fly of the family Heterorhyphidae.	
Homoeoptychopteris	H. incerta	Grassel, Braunschweig	Multiple specimens	Incertae sedis	
Liassonympha	L. compacta; L. glans; L. guttula	Hondelage, Braunschweig; Hondelage, Braunschweig; Hattorf, Fallersleben; Schandelah, nr Braunschweig	Multiple specimens	Incertae sedis	
Leptotipuloides	L. fastigata	Hattorf, Fallersleben	Multiple specimens	A crane fly of the family Limoniidae.	
Mikrotipula	M. dixaeformis	Hattorf, Fallersleben	Multiple specimens	A crane fly of the family Limoniidae.	
Mesorhyphus	M. ulrichi	Große Kley, Mörse	Multiple specimens	A wood gnat of the family Anisopodidae.	Extant member of Anisopodidae, Posidonia genera were probably similar
Metatrichopteridium	M. confusum	Schandelah, near Braunschweig	Multiple specimens	A fly of the family Hennigmatidae. It represents the oldest known genus of this primitive family.	
Nannotanyderus	N. krzeminskii	Kerkhofen	Multiple specimens	A primitive crane fly of the family Tanyderidae. Extant members of the family are nectar feeder while the diets of extinct members cannot be determined precisely.	Extant member of Tanyderidae, Posidonia genera were probably similar
Ozotipula	O. tarda	Grassel, Braunschweig	Multiple specimens	A crane fly of the family Limoniidae.	
Praemacrochile	P. decipiens	Hondelage, Braunschweig; Schandelah, near Braunschweig; Schandelah, near Braunschweig	Multiple specimens	A primitive crane fly of the family Tanyderidae.	
Propexis	P. incerta	Hondelage, Braunschweig	Multiple specimens	Incertae sedis	
Protoplecia	P. hattorfensis	Hattorf, Fallersleben	Multiple specimens	A fly of the family Protopleciidae.	
Protorhyphus	P. ovisimilis; P. simplex	Grassel, Braunschweig; Kerkhofen	Multiple specimens	A fly of the family Protorhyphidae.	
Rhopaloscolex	R. brevis; R. longus	Schandelah, nr Braunschweig	Multiple specimens	Incertae sedis	
Sphallonymphites	S. decurtatus	Flechtorf near Fallersleben	Multiple specimens	Incertae sedis	
Tega	T. thuyi; T. germanica	Bascharage; Grimmen	Multiple specimens	A wood gnat of the family Anisopodidae.	

=== Echinodermata ===
Echinoderm debris is relatively abundant in the shale-free Unken and Salzburg members, including crinoid and brittle star skeletal elements; sea urchins take their place later in the formation, with them having especially diversified at that time, leading to pedicellaria being observed very often.

==== Asterozoa ====
Genus	Species	Location	Material	Notes	Images
Barbaraster	B. colbachi; B. muenzbergerae	Neischmelz near Dudelange	Multiple specimens	A brittle star within the family Ophiomusina.	
Dermacantha	D. reolidi	Neischmelz near Dudelange	Multiple specimens	A brittle star in incertae sedis family in the order Ophionereididae.	
Enakomusium	E. geisingense	Bachhausen	Multiple specimens	A brittle star in the family Ophiolepididae.	Holotype Multiple specimens from the Sachrang Formation
Dermocoma	D. sp.	Neischmelz near Dudelange	Multiple specimens	A brittle star in incertae sedis family in the order Ophiodermatina.	
Inexpectacantha	I. acrobatica; I. ullmanni	Neischmelz near Dudelange	Multiple specimens	A brittle star in the family Euryophiurida.	
Lapidaster	L. fasciatus; L. hougardae	Neischmelz near Dudelange	Multiple specimens	A brittle star in the family Ophioscolecidae.	
Ophiarachna	O. liasica	Schömberg	Multiple specimens	A brittle star un the family Ophiacanthida. Very common, related to non anoxic water sedimentation.	
Ophiogojira	O. andreui; O. aliorbis	Neischmelz near Dudelange	Multiple specimens	A brittle star in the family Ophiomusaidae.	
Ophiocopa	O. sp. nov.	Neischmelz near Dudelange	Multiple specimens	A brittle star in the family Ophiotomidae.	
Ophiocten?	O.? seeweni	Schömberg	Multiple specimens	An Ophiuridan in the family Ophiuridae.	
Ophiohelus	O. sp. nov.	Neischmelz near Dudelange	Multiple specimens	A brittle star in the family Ophiohelidae.	
Ophiomusa	O. perezi	Neischmelz near Dudelange	Multiple specimens	A brittle star in the family Ophiomusaidae.	
Ophiomisidium	O. pratchettae	Neischmelz near Dudelange	Multiple specimens	A brittle star in the family Astrophiuridae.	
Ophiopholis	O. trispinosa	Schömberg	Multiple specimens	A brittle star in the family Ophiactidae. Very rare in the layers.	Modern specimen
Ophiotardis	O. tennanti; O. astonensis	Neischmelz near Dudelange; Schömberg	Multiple specimens	A brittle star in the family Ophiopyrgidae.	
Palaeocoma	P. kortei	Neischmelz near Dudelange	Multiple specimens	A brittle star in the family Ophiopyrgidae.	
Sinosura	S. brodiei; S. cf. brodiei; S. dieschbourgae	Ohmden; Schömberg; Neischmelz near Dudelange	Multiple specimens	A brittle star in the family Ophioleucidae. The dominant asterozoan taxon in the formation.	Fossil specimen
Thanataster	T. desdemonia	Neischmelz near Dudelange	Multiple specimens	A brittle star in the family Ophiomusina.	

==== Echinoidea ====
Genus	Species	Location	Material	Notes	Images
Cidaris	C. spp.	Holzmaden; Ohmden; Dotternhaussen; Altforf; Banz	Multiple specimens	A sea urchin in the family Cidaridae.	Modern specimen
Diademopsis	D. crinifera; D. aequituberculata; D. behtensis; D. bowerbanki	Chalhac; Häufig in Obereggenen; Aselfingen; Gomaringen; Reutlingen; Dotternhausen; Mössingen; Ohmenhausen; Altdorf; Oedhof; Mistelgau; Banz; Irlbach; Kerkhofen; Heiningen; Reichenbach; Wasseralfingen; Unterstürmig; Schandelah; Hondelange	Multiple specimens	A sea urchin in the family Pedinidae. It is the most common sea urchin found in the formation	Multiple specimens from Holzmaden
Eodiadema	E. minutum	Holzmaden; Ohmden; Dotternhausen	Multiple specimens	A sea urchin in the family Diadematidae	Multiple specimens from Holzmaden
Hemipedina	H. sp.	Holzmaden; Dotternhausen	Multiple specimens	A sea urchin in the family Pedinidae	
Procidaris	P. edwardsi	Holzmaden; Dotternhaussen; Banz	Multiple specimens	A sea urchin in the family Miocidaridae	
Pseudodiadema	P. posidoniae; P. jurensis	Holzmaden; Ohmden; Dotternhausen	Multiple specimens	A sea urchin in the family Pseudodiadematidae	

==== Holothuroidea ====
Genus	Species	Location	Material	Notes	Images
Achistrum	A. issleri	Achdorf; Aselfingen; Weilheim/Teck; Göppingen und Reichenbach; Bewegtwasserfazi; Obereggenen im Breisgau	Multiple specimens	A sea cucumber in the family Achistridae inside Apodida.	specimen
Mortensenites	M.liasicus	Achdorf; Aselfingen; Göppingen und Reichenbach; Obereggenen im Breisgau	Multiple specimens	A sea cucumber in the family Calclamnidae inside Dendrochirotida.	
Stichopites	S. mortenseni	Achdorf; Aselfingen; Gomaringen; Göppingen und Reichenbach; Obereggenen im Breisgau	Multiple specimens	A sea cucumber in the family Stichopitidae. Occurs sporadically in non-bituminous sediments in the upper bifrons zone	
Theelia	T. heptalampra; T. florealis	Aselfingen; Holzmaden; Ohmden; Dotternhausen; Gomaringen	Multiple specimens	A sea cucumber in the family Chiridotidae. It is the only major genus of sea cucumber reported locally in the Posidonienschiefer.	

==== Crinoidea ====
Genus	Species	Location	Material	Notes	Images
Pentacrinites	P. fossilis; P. briareus; P. franconicus; P. dichotomus; P. quenstedti	Chalhac; Häufig in Obereggenen; Aselfingen; Gomaringen; Reutlingen; Dotternhausen; Mössingen; Ohmenhausen; Altdorf; Oedhof; Mistelgau; Banz; Irlbach; Kerkhofen; Heiningen; Reichenbach; Wasseralfingen; Unterstürmig; Schandelah; Hondelange	Various complete and nearly complete specimens, some associated with rafts.	Type genus of the family Pentacrinitidae. Like Seirocrinus, Pentacrinites formed colonies in rafting wood. Was a small genus, with multiple specimens no more than 1 meter long, usually measuring 40–70 cm.	Close view in one specimen from the Posidonienschiefer
Praetetracrinus	P. kutscheri	Schömberg	Isolated Stems	A crinoid in the family Plicatocrinidae.	
Procomaster	P. pentadactylus	Aichelberg	Exceptionally well preserved individual with the arms, pinnules and cirri largely intact	A crinoid in the family Isocrinida. This benthic crinoid clearly represents an exotic element in the typical Posidonia fauna, likely moved from coastal settings.	
Seirocrinus	S. subangularis	Banz; Altdorf; Mistelgau; Aichelberg; Schandelah; Dotternhausen; Holzmaden; Ohmden; Maurach	Various complete and nearly complete specimens, some associated with rafts	The largest known crinoid, from the family Pentacrinitidae. Seirocrinus consists of fossils in colonies along large wood trunks, with specimens up to 14 m long and the largest reaching 26 m, which makes it among the tallest known Mesozoic organisms, one of the largest invertebrates known in the fossil record and one if the tallest known animals. It was an open ocean organism that lived on rafting wood, probably filtering food and serving as a refuge for other animals, such as ammonites. The crinoids had a large colonization process, based on their fossils in the wood. The large rafts were the home for a high variety of marine organisms, such as barnacles, ammonites and others. It has been estimated that without the presence of modern raft wood predators (that appeared in the Bathonian) these rafts could have lasted up to 5 years, being the main reason that the crinoids were able to reach such huge sizes. The large rafts were also probably essential to distribute animals along the Early Jurassic seas.	Close view of one specimen from the Posidonienschiefer

== Vertebrata ==
=== Fishes ===
==== Chondrichthyes ====
Genus	Species	Location	Material	Notes	Images
Acanthorhina	A. jaekeli	Holzmaden	Head and postcranial remains	A member of Myriacanthidae inside Chimaeriformes. An aberrant chimaera with a strange elongated nose and horns over the skull.	Acanthorhina
Acrodus	A. nobilis	Holzmaden; Dotternhausen	Teeth	Type genus of the family Acrodontidae.	
Bathytheristes	B. gracilis	Ohmden	Upper ("palatine") toothplate	A member of Callorhynchidae inside Chimaeriformes. Similar to Callorhinchus, among the oldest known of its type. It is the first "modern" chimaera from the Toarcian.	Callorhinchus milii may be the closest relative of Bathytheristes
Bdellodus	B. bollensis	Holzmaden; Dotternhausen	Teeth	A shark of the family Hybodontidae. An aberrant hybodontid with crushing dentition.	Bdellodus
Crassodus	C. reifi	Dotternhausen	Meckelian cartilage, Jaws, teeth, palatoquadrates, placoid scales and dearticulated parts of the labial, hyoid and branchial skeleton.	A shark of the family Hybodontidae. The type specimen belongs to a large hybodontid, with an estimated total length of up to 3 m.	
Hybodus	H. hauffianus; H. delabechei; H. pyramidalis; H. reticulatus; H. sp.	Banz; Holzmaden; Ohmden; Dotternhausen; Dormettingen; Gomaringen; Aichelberg; Kerkhofen; Hondelange; Schandelah; Altdorf; Klein Lehmhagen	Various complete and nearly complete specimens	Type genus of the family Hybodontidae. It is the most abundant shark in the layers of the Sachrang Formation, with some of the best preserved specimens of the genus known.	Hybodus Holzmaden specimen, among the best preserved of the genus, with belemmnites inside.
Metopacanthus	M. bollensis; M. sp.	Holzmaden; Ohmden	Isolated dorsal fin spines, chondrocranium, partial fin spine and length of vertebral column	A member of Myriacanthidae inside Chimaeriformes. An aberrant chimaera with a second jaw-like structure on its head.	Life restoration
Palaeospinax	P. egertoni	Ohmden	Anterior part of body with basicranium, palatoquadrates, Meckel's cartilage, ceratohyals, epihyals, teeth, traces of the branchial arches and the anterior finspine	Type member of the family Palaeospinacidae.	
Palidiplospinax	P. smithwoodwardi	Holzmaden	Articulated vertebral column, girdles, both fin spines and clasper organ	A member of the family Palaeospinacidae.	
Pseudonotidanus	P. politus	Holzmaden	Partial, articulated specimen	A shark of the family Hexanchiformes. It was identified originally as a member of the genus Palaeospinax.	
Rajiformes indet.	Gen et sp. nov	Holzmaden	SMNS 52666, Incomplete specimen	A possible member of Batoidea. It was originally identified as a member of Galeiformes.	SMNS 52666, the unnamed rajiform holotype
Recurvacanthus	R. uniserialis	Ohmden	Isolated fin spine	A member of Myriacanthidae inside Chimaeriformes.	

==== Actinopterygii ====
Genus	Species	Location	Material	Notes	Images
Caturus	C. smithwoodwardi	Holzmaden; Würtenmberg	Various complete and nearly complete specimens	Type genus of the family Caturidae inside Amiiformes	Caturus
Dapedium	D. pholidotum; D. caelatum; D. stollorum; D. sp.	Banz; Altdorf; Mistelgau; Aichelberg; Schandelah; Niedersachsen; Dotternhausen; Holzmaden; Ohmden; Maurach; Klein Lehmhagen	Various complete and nearly complete specimens	A deep-bodied neopterygian, the type genus of the family Dapediidae. Unpublished material indicates the presence of one or even two more still undescribed species of Dapedium in the Lower Toarcian.	Dapedium
Euthynotus	E. incognitus; E. cf.incognitus; E. intermedius	Holzmaden; Ohmden	Various complete and nearly complete specimens	A member of the family Pachycormidae.	Euthynotus
Germanostomus	G. pectopteri	Holzmaden	Incomplete specimens	A pachycormid.	
Haasichthys	H. michelsi	Hondelange	Nearly complete specimen	A pachycormid.	
Heterolepidotus	H. sp.	Schandelah	Isolated teeth; Isolated scales; Isolated jaws	A member of the family Furidae inside Ionoscopiformes	
Holzmadenfuro	H. rebmanni	Holzmaden	Complete specimen	A ganoin-scaled member of Ophiopsiformes (Halecomorphi). The type specimen is 51 cm long, and has elongated and serrated body scales before the dorsal fin and tiny ganoid scales after it.	
Hypsocorminae indet.	Indeterminate	Holzmaden	SMNS 10014, left dentary	Closes a 17-million-year gap in the fossil record	
Lepidotes	L. elvensis; L. gigas; L. sp.	Banz; Mistelgau; Aichelberg; Schandelah; Niedersachsen; Dotternhausen; Holzmaden; Ohmden; Klein Lehmhagen	Various complete and nearly complete specimens	A common member of the Lepisosteiformes.	Lepidotes
Leptolepis	L. jaegeri; L. antisiodorensis; L. coryphaenoides; L. bronni; L.normandica; L. sp.	Banz; Altdorf; Oedhof; Mistelgau; Aichelberg; Schandelah; Niedersachsen; Dotternhausen; Holzmaden; Ohmden; Aalen; Hemmikon; Nancy; Maurach; Klein Lehmhagen	Thousands of complete and nearly complete specimens	A member of the family Leptolepididae. The most common fish found within the formation, Leptolepis is thought to have formed large schools like modern herring.	Leptolepis
Longileptolepis	L. wiedenrothi	SW of Braunschweig	MB. f.7612, nearly complete specimen.	A member of the family Leptolepididae. It was identified as Paraleptolepis, but this name is currently occupied by a Japanese fish genus of Early Cretaceous age. It differs from Leptolepis coryphaenoides through the presence of a few autapomorphies and also in the retention of several primitive features not present on the former. A relatively small fish, around 14 cm long.	Longileptolepis
"Lycodus"	"L. gigas"	Holzmaden	Various complete and nearly complete specimens	A possible representative of the family Pachycormidae. It is based on rather fragmentary specimens and may be the same animal as Saurostomus	
Ohmdenfuro	O. bodmani	Ohmden	Nearly complete specimen with broken skull	The first ganoin-scaled member of Ophiopsiformes (Halecomorphi) from the Posidonienschiefer. Elongated morphology, with a length of ~39 cm, covered by smooth, massive ganoin scales.	
Ohmdenia	O. multidentata	Ohmden; Holzmaden	Single desarticulated specimen	A large member of the family Pachycormidae, with a length of up to 2.5–3 m and an estimated weight over 200 kg.	Ohmdenia
Pachycormus	P. macropterus; P. bollensis	Banz; Altdorf; Dotternhausen; Holzmaden; Ohmden	Various complete and nearly complete specimens	Type member of the family Pachycormidae. A large representative of its family, reaching up to 1.5 m. One specimen preserves the stomach filled with numerous hooklets.	Pachycormus
"Pholidophorus"	"P." germanicus; "P." hartmanni; "P." bechei; "P." limbatus; "P." sp.	Gomaringen; Holzmaden; Dotternhausen; Ohmden; Hondelange; Klein Lehmhagen	Various complete and nearly complete specimens	A member of the family Pholidophoridae. Not referable to the genus anymore and awaiting for redescription	Pholidophorus
Ptycholepis	P. bollensis; P. barrati	Dotternhausen; Holzmaden; Ohmden	Various complete and nearly complete specimens	Type genus of the family Ptycholepididae inside Ptycholepiformes. It is one of the youngest representatives of its family.	Ptycholepis
"Sauropsis"	"S." latus; "S." veruinalis	Holzmaden; Ohmden	Various complete and nearly complete specimens	A large member of the family Pachycormidae. Not referable to the genus anymore and awaiting for redescription	Sauropsis
Saurorhynchus	S. hauffi; S. brevirostris	Banz; Altdorf; Oedhof; Mistelgau; Aichelberg; Schandelah; Niedersachsen; Dotternhausen; Holzmaden; Ohmden; Maurach; Klein Lehmhagen	Various complete and nearly complete specimens	The youngest representative of the family Saurichthyidae, known for its large jaws, similar to modern Belonidae.	Saurorhynchus
Saurostomus	S. esocinus	Banz; Altdorf; Dotternhausen; Holzmaden; Ohmden	Various complete and nearly complete specimens	A member of the family Pachycormidae. A large representative of the family, reaching sizes up to 2.3 m.	Saurostomus
"Semionotus"	"S." leptocephalus	Holzmaden	Single specimen (lost)	A potential member of Semionotidae	
Strongylosteus	S. hindenburgi	Holzmaden; Ohmden	Various complete and nearly complete specimens	A large member of the Chondrosteidae and the largest non-reptilian marine vertebrate of the Posidonienschiefer Fm, with a size around 3.2 m.	Strongylosteus
Tetragonolepis	T. drosera; T. semicincta; T. discus; T. sp.	Banz; Altdorf; Mistelgau; Aichelberg; Schandelah; Dotternhausen; Holzmaden; Ohmden; Maurach; Klein Lehmhagen	Various complete and nearly complete specimens	A deep-bodied neopterygian of the family Dapediidae.	Tetragonolepis
Toarcocephalus	T. morlok	Holzmaden	SMNS 59978 &SMNS 52044, articulated skulls	A member of the family Coccolepididae. The first representative of the family from the Toarcian.	

==== Sarcopterygii ====
Genus	Species	Location	Material	Notes	Images
Latimeriidae indet.	Indeterminate	Holzmaden	A palatoquadrate	Similar to Undina spp. and Libys spp., as well the smallest coelacanth in the formation (347 mm).	
Trachymetopon	T. liasicum	Holzmaden; Ohmden; Dotternhausen	Various complete and nearly complete specimens	A large coelacanth of the family Mawsoniidae. The largest specimen known is GPIT.OS.770 (holotype), being over 1.6 m long. The specimen preserves an ossified lung inside the abdominal cavity, and most of the body, being also one of the most complete coelacanths of the Jurassic found.	Trachymetopon GPIT.OS.770

=== Amniota ===
==== Ichthyosauria ====
Inderminate specimens are known.

Genus	Species	Location	Material	Notes	Images
Eurhinosaurus	E. longirostris; E. huenei; E. quenstedti; E. sp.	Banz; Altdorf; Hondelange; Schandelah; Holzmaden; Ohmden; Dotternhausen	Various complete and nearly complete specimens	A large ichthyosaur of the family Leptonectidae which, convergently with modern swordfish, evolved an extremely long upper jaw. Like these fishes, Eurhinosaurus is believed to be a fast swimming predator, able to hunt fish schools on same way. Large specimens of up to 6 m are known.	E. longirostris
Hauffiopteryx	H. typicus; H. altera	Holzmaden; Ohmden; Dotternhausen	Various complete and nearly complete specimens	Likely a member of Parvipelvia, sister group to Stenopterygius + Ophthalmosauridae. A small- to mid-sized ichthyosaur, 2–3 m in length, with a relatively short and slender antorbital rostrum.	H. typicus
Leptopterygius?	L.? sp.	Holzmaden; Ohmden; Dotternhausen	Various complete and nearly complete specimens	A possible member of the family Leptonectidae. Most of the specimens of this genus have been referred to Leptonectes or Temnodontosaurus, although some remains in the Posidonienschiefer are too complex to be clearly referred.	
Magnipterygius	M.huenei	Dotternhausen	Almost complete articulated skeleton	An ichthyosaur of the family Stenopterygiidae. Magnipterygius may not have grown to a total length of much more than 120 cm. It is therefore potentially only the second post-Triassic ichthyosaur known with such a small body size	
Stenopterygius	S. quadriscissus; S. triscissus; S. uniter; S. sp.	Banz; Altdorf; Mistelgau; Schlierbach; Hondelange; Grassel; Beienrode; Schandelah; Aichelberg; Staffelstein; Pferdsfeld; Oedhof; Holzmaden; Ohmden; Gomaringen; Dotternhausen; Dörnten; Langenbrücken; Bascharange; Klein Lehmhagen	Various complete and nearly complete specimens	Type genus of the family Stenopterygiidae. A common Toarcian ichthyosaur, present in multiple layers. The rather exquisite level of preservation has led to even the coloration being preserved. This shows a clear countershading, with an upper part being darker than the lower, similar to modern killer whales, the Heaviside's dolphin or the Dall's porpoise. There is also evidence of changes in color with ontogenetic changes, going from dark juveniles to countershaded adults. The skin was flexible & scaleless, as in dolphins. The study of several specimens has revelated that Stenopterygius quadriscissus underwent a size-related trophic niche shift through ontogeny, shifting from a piscivorous diet to a teuthophagous diet, known thanks to exquisitely preserved stomach contents.	S. quadriscissus
Suevoleviathan	S. disinteger; S. integer	Holzmaden; Ohmden; Banz; Dotternhausen	Various complete and nearly complete specimens	Type genus of the family Suevoleviathanidae. Includes specimens up to 4 m long.	S. integer
Temnodontosaurus	T. trigonodon; T. burgundiae; T. zetlandicus; T. "sp. A"; T. "sp. B"	Banz; Altdorf; Mistelgau; Schlierbach; Hondelange; Grassel; Schandelah; Dörnten; Langenbrücken; Holzmaden; Ohmden; Dotternhausen; Klein Lehmhagen	Various complete and nearly complete specimens	Type genus of the family Temnodontosauridae. A large macroraptorial ichthyosaur, the apex predator of its environment. It ranges between 9 and 12 m, being one of the largest known ichthyosaurs, characterised by skulls and jaws over 1 m in length, with the largest being over 1.9 m long. It has been found with fragments of young ichthyosaurs in its stomach.	T. trigonodon

==== Plesiosauria ====
Genus	Species	Location	Material	Notes	Images
Hauffiosaurus	H. zanoni	Dotternhausen; Holzmaden	Various complete and nearly complete specimens	A basal member of Pliosauridae. It had a long snout similar to that of Peloneustes, gharials or dolphins.	Hauffiosaurus
"Hydrorion"	"H." brachypterygius; "H." sp.	Holzmaden	Various complete and nearly complete specimens	A junior synonym of M. brachypterygius.	"Hydrorion"
Meyerasaurus	M. victor	Holzmaden	Various complete and nearly complete specimens	A member of Rhomaleosauridae.	Meyerasaurus
Microcleidus	M. brachypterygius; M. melusinae	Holzmaden; Ohmden; Dotternhausen; Pétange-Belval line	Various complete and nearly complete specimens	Type genus of the plesiosaur family Microcleididae.	M. brachypterygius
Plesiosauria indet.	Genus and species indet.	Holzmaden	SMNS 51141, subcomplete skeleton	Mixture of features seen in plesiosauroids and pliosauroids	
Plesiosauroidea indet.	Genus and species indet.	Holzmaden	Several specimens of different degrees of preservation: SMNS 51747, SMNS 51143, MB.R.1991, MH Nr. 8	Most of the specimens have been previously referred to Hydrorion brachypterygius	
Plesionectes	P. longicollum	Holzmaden	SMNS 51945, an almost complete articulated skeleton lacking most of the skull	A plesiosauroid known from a well-preserved immature specimen with possible phosphatised muscle tissues and eumelanin that possibly corresponds to areas dark-coloured in life.	Plesionectes
Plesiopterys	P. wildi	Holzmaden	Various complete and nearly complete specimens, one with soft tissue.	A Plesiosauroidean that has been linked with Cryptoclididae, yet recently relocated as an indet position. Specimen MH 7 shows a mosaic of smooth skin and (possibly keeled) scales.	Plesiopterys
"Plesiosaurus"	"P." bavaricus; "P." posidoniae	Berg bei Neumarkt; Creez; Ohmden	Isolated caudal & cervical vertebrae; GPIT MS/V20/2-7, Incomplete left pelvic paddle	A plesiosaur assigned to the genus Plesiosaurus, yet it shows more affinities with Anningasaura. "P." posidoniae has been tentatively assigned to Pliosauridae and probably to Hauffiosaurus.	
Seeleyosaurus	S. guilelmiimperatoris	Holzmaden; Ohmden; Dotternhausen; Schandelah; Banz?; Klein Lehmhagen	Various complete and nearly complete specimens	A plesiosaur of the family Microcleididae. It was originally placed as "Plesiosaurus guilelmiimperatoris".	Seeleyosaurus

==== Sphenodontia ====
Genus	Species	Location	Material	Notes	Images
Palaeopleurosaurus	P. posidoniae	Holzmaden; Dotternhausen?; Kerkhofen	Various complete and nearly complete specimens	An aquatic sphenodont of the family Pleurosauridae. Paleopleurosaurus shows a slight skeletal specialization for an aquatic lifestyle, achieved through the Jurassic gradually in pleurosaurs.	Palaeopleurosaurus

==== Testudinata ====
Genus	Species	Location	Material	Notes	Images
Mesochelydia indet.	Indeterminate	Schandelah	SHMB-G.4221, almost complete skeleton	Related to Eileanchelys and Heckerochelys.	
Testudinata indet.	Indeterminate	Altdorf; Banz; Hondelange	Shells? and Isolated plastrons	Multiple specimens, referred/identified as turtles have been recovered, yet only the ones from Altdorf belong to a Testudine. Other remains are either not catalogued or in private collections.	

==== Crocodylomorpha ====
Genus	Species	Location	Material	Notes	Images
Macrospondylus	M. bollensis; M. sp.	Banz; Bad Boll; Altdorf; Mistelgau; Hondenlange; Grassel; Schandelah; Berg; Schlierbach; Niedersachsen; Holzmaden; Ohmden; Dotternhausen; Dudelange-Bettembourg; Klein Lehmhagen	Various complete and nearly complete specimens	A longirostrine thalattosuchian of the family Machimosauridae. Was considered synonymous with Steneosaurus until in 2020 the latter was recovered as invalid. It reached large sizes, with specimens exceeding 5 m, being a generalist predator.	M. bollensis
Mystriosaurus	M. laurillardi; M. sp.	Banz; Altdorf; Mistelgau; Holzmaden; Ohmden; Dotternhausen; Schandelah; Klein Lehmhagen	Various complete and nearly complete specimens	A mesorostrine thalattosuchian of the family Teleosauridae. A marine crocodylomorph with a diet probably composed of fish. Was considered synonymous with Steneosaurus until recently. Due to the unusual placement of the external nares, Mystriosaurus was likely more terrestrial, or spent a greater amount of time on land, than other teleosauroids. This would explain its greater presence in zones of the formation closer to the emerged landmasses. Its morphology suggest it was a mesorostrine generalist.	Mystriosaurus
Pelagosaurus	P. typus; P. sp.	Banz; Altdorf; Ohmden; Holzmaden; Dotternhausen; Dudelange-Bettembourg	Various complete and nearly complete specimens	A thalattosuchian with a complex designation, probably the basalmost metriorhynchoid. Pelagosaurus typus was a small-bodied thalattosuchian (~1 m in length) considered to be an adept aquatic pursuit predator, with a long streamlined snout ideal for snapping at fast moving prey (one specimen was found with Leptolepis fishes inside) and large, anterolaterally placed orbits for increased visual acuity.	Pelagosaurus
Plagiophthalmosuchus	P. gracilirostris	Dudelange-Bettembourg	Various complete and nearly complete specimens	A longirostrine thalattosuchian, the most basal known. Was considered synonymous with Steneosaurus. Longirostrine specialist, probably an active fish hunter.	
Platysuchus	P. multiscrobiculatus	Holzmaden; Ohmden; Dotternhausen; Dudelange-Bettembourg	Various complete and nearly complete specimens	A longirostrine thalattosuchian of the family Teleosauridae. Platysuchus was slightly more robust than its contemporaneous relatives, being probably adapted to hunt larger fish. It was a heavily armoured, semi-terrestrial longirostrine generalist form, indicated by the extensive and tightly packed rows of dorsal osteoderms.	Platysuchus

==== Pterosauria ====
Genus	Species	Location	Material	Notes	Images
Campylognathoides	C. zitteli; C. liasicus; C. cf. C. liasicus; C. sp.	Banz; Altdorf; Mistelgau; Hondelange; Holzmaden; Ohmden; Dotternhausen; Schandelah	Various complete and nearly complete specimens	A novialoidean pterosaur, type genus of the family Campylognathoidea. A 2024 study found Clarkeiteuthis hooks within the gut of some specimens, suggesting a teuthophagous lifestyle.	Nearly complete Campylognathoides
Dorygnathus	D. banthensis; D. cf.banthensis; D. mistelgauensis?; D. sp.	Banz; Altdorf; Mistelgau; Schandelah; Hondelange; Beienrode; Holzmaden; Ohmden; Dotternhausen	Various complete and nearly complete specimens	A rhamphorhynchine Pterosaur. It is one of the best known Early Jurassic pterosaurs. Dorygnathus mistelgauensis is considered a junior synonym until more data can be recovered from the specimen, which is held in a private collection. Soft tissues, including fur/feather-like filaments & possible coloration traces have been found.	Nearly complete Dorygnathus
Parapsicephalus	cf. P. purdoni	Altdorf	Skull	A rhamphorhynchine Pterosaur. Has been assigned to the genus Dorygnathus. It has an almost entirely complete skull which may help to explain the status of the genus Parapsicephalus.	

==== Dinosauria ====
Genus	Species	Location	Material	Notes	Images
Emausaurus	E. ernsti	Klein Lehmhagen	Right side of the skull, the right lower jaw, caudal vertebrae, neural arches, a radius, a metatarsal, a claw, fragments of ribs, scutes and plates.	A basal member of Thyreophora. The compacted pile of disarticulated cranial and postcranial elements of the basal thyreophoran Emausaurus has been suspected to be a Speiballen (i.e., a compacted mass of indigestible stomach contents) regurgitated by a large marine reptile.	Emausaurus
Gravisauria indet.	Indeterminate	Klein Lehmhagen	Iliac preacetabular process; Distal right pubis; Proximal left ischium; Proximal right ischium;Single dorsal neural spine	Has affinities with the genus Tazoudasaurus and it is clearly distinctive form the also Toarcian Ohmdenosaurus.	
Ohmdenosaurus	O. liasicus	Ohmden	Tibia and astragalus	A gravisaurian sauropod, one of the few formally described from the Toarcian. At first it was confused for a plesiosaur bone.	Ohmdenosaurus
Thyreophora indet.	Indeterminate	Klein Lehmhagen	GG 504, osteoderm	Interpreted as representing a lateral osteoderm of the neck or shoulder region of an early diverging thyreophoran	

== Plantae ==
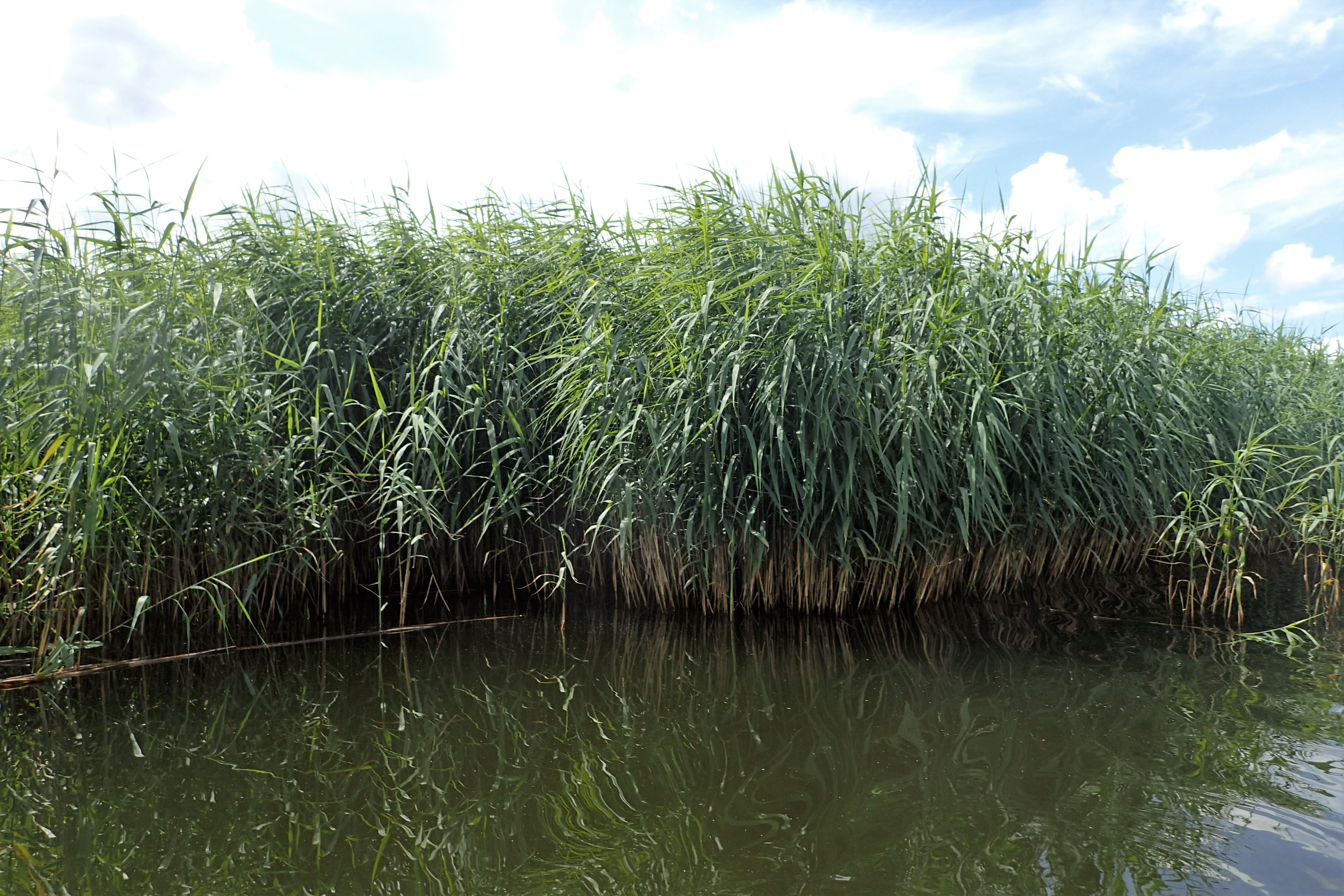
The Flora is dominated by horsetails, which may be in a similar ecological niche to the modern genus Phragmites, able to resist saline conditions. Storms or floods may be the major events that transported this flora to the sea.

The macroflora of the Posidonia Slate can be described as extremely poor in species. Apart from the remains of horsetails, it is without exception the remains of coarse branches and fronds from gymnosperms, which can be assumed were transport resistant. Remains of ferns are completely missing, except for tall arboreal ferns (Peltaspermales). Most of the flora was reported from the area of Braunschweig. The major explanation for this flora could be that the plants in question are mono-or oligotypic stands on the edge of the waters that flowed into the Posidonienschiefer sea, probably torn away in flood events, easily fragmented during transport and from waves, especially in the occasional storm events postulated. In terms of taphonomy, this would result in a comparison with today's reed Phragmites, which can form extensive stocks on the edge of shallow and slowly flowing waters. The wood remnants clearly indicate higher diversity of coniferous flora in the delivery area than remains of leafy branches. This fact is likely to be proportionate, similar to the frequent occurrence of charcoalized trunks, most of them are believed to be "driftwoods" which spent a long time drifting, and this also suggests frequent settlement with mussels and full-grown crinoids. The deposition settings are a large distance from the nearest coastline (for southern Germany about 100 kilometers), making only plants resistant to transportation able to survive long enough to get deposited. At Irlbach and Kheleim, NE of Regensburg, where the Posidonienschiefer has a near mainland deposit with abundant sand, a rich deposit filled with plant remains of different kinds (Seeds, reproductive organs, leaves, stems, cuticles and wood) with traces of coal was recovered, however, it was never studied in depth. Of all the plant material excavated only a few bennettite leaves and two conifer branches with leaves were cited and none studied. In the Austrian sites the Sachrang Member was developed in the basinal area, while the Unken Member, sandwiched between red, often condensed limestones, represents the marginal facies. Due to being more marginal and connected with the southern Vindelician land, the most diverse palynological assemblages of the formation are found transported from zones with moldanuvian granites as proven by the feldspar accumulations.

=== Phytoclasts ===
Phytoclasts have been recovered from several sections on the formation, but only studied in depth from the Dotternhausen and specially Dormettingen. Here two kinds of phytoclasts were recovered, opaque phytoclasts (charcoal, indicator of wildfire activity on nearby landmasses, indicator of seasonal alterations of the water column) and translucent phytoclasts (indicator of proximal landmasses with high availability of wood and other plant material, as well as transport conditions). On the lowermost part of the section opaque phytoclasts are low (15% of the total organic matter) while translucent are incredibly abundant (40%), lowering to around 20-10% on the next section. The Exaratum subzone is the only one with an inverse trend and more abundance of opaque phytoclasts. On the Bifrons level, both types reach between a 15% and a 30%, showing a rapid increase, then decreasing at the end of the section to values of less than 10%. Opaque Phytoclasts, for a supposed marine deposit are relatively abundant on some sections, while their decreasing levels suggest (along with increasing levels of Kaolinite) an increased delivery of land plant material by rivers, from areas with wetter climate and less frequent fires, while its rise suggests the opposite, a nearby continental setting with dry climate and continuous wildfire activity.

=== Palynology ===
Genus	Species	Location	Material	Notes	Images
Alisporites	A. grandis; A. radialis; A. microsaccus; A. lowoodensis; A. thomasi; A. robustus; A. spp.	Dormettingen; Hondelage; Beienrode; Grassel; Schandelah; Hattorf, Fallersleben; Flechtorf near Fallersleben; Salem Borehole	Pollen	Affinities with the families Peltaspermaceae, Corystospermaceae or Umkomasiaceae inside Peltaspermales. Pollen of uncertain provenance, that may be derived from any of the members of the Peltaspermales. The lack of distinctive characters and bad preservation are among the main factors making this palynological residue difficult to classify. arborescent to arbustive seed ferns.	
Baculatisporites	B. spp.	Dormettingen	Spores	Affinities with the family Osmundaceae in the Polypodiopsida. Near fluvial current ferns, related to the modern Osmunda regalis.	
Callialasporites	C. dampieri; C. turbatus; C. spp.	Dormettingen; Hondelage; Beienrode; Grassel; Schandelah	Pollen	Affinities with Pinaceae inside Coniferae.	Extant Pinus cone, example of the Pinidae. Callialasporites is similar to the pollen found in this genus
Cerebropollenites	C.mesozoicus; C. macroverrucosus; C. thiergartii; C. sp.	Dormettingen; Dutch Central Graben; West Netherlands Basin; Hondelage; Beienrode; Grassel; Hattorf, Fallersleben; Flechtorf near Fallersleben; Schandelah; Salem Borehole	Pollen	Affinities with both Sciadopityaceae and Miroviaceae inside Pinopsida. This pollen's resemblance with extant Sciadopitys suggests that Miroviaceae may be an extinct lineage of sciadopityaceaous-like plants.	Extant Sciadopitys. Cerebropollenites likely come from a related plant
Chasmatosporites	C. apertus; C. megaverruculosus; C. hians; C.elegans; C. spp.	Dormettingen; Dutch Central Graben; West Netherlands Basin; Hondelage; Beienrode; Grassel; Schandelah; Hattorf, Fallersleben; Flechtorf near Fallersleben; Dormettingen	Pollen	Affinities with Cycadaceae and probably Cycadales. Alternatively it may be pollen from Bennettitales. It is the most abundant non-conifer pollen recovered from the formation, recovered in all the major sampled areas. Probably derived from arbustive cycads, this genus is related with dry settings, even being known from desertic regions.	Closer Look of Macrozamia cones, a common Cycad. Chasmatosporites may come from a related plant
Circulina	C. meyeriana	Unken, sample 1	Pollen	Affinities with the Cheirolepidiaceae inside Pinales. Pollen from arborescent to arbustive plants. It is rare within the samples measured.	
Circumpollis	C. pharisaeus; C. philosophus	Hondelage; Beienrode; Grassel; Hattorf, Fallersleben; Schandelah; Dormettingen	Pollen	Affinities with Cheirolepidiaceae inside Coniferae. Pollen of medium to large arborescent plants, specially conifers.	
Classopollis	C. meyeriana; C. simplex; C. classoides; C. dellassis; C. reclusus; C. striatus; C. tetradenverband; C. torosus; C. spp.	Dormettingen; Dutch Central Graben; West Netherlands Basin; Klein Lehmhagen pit, Grimmen; Hondelage; Beienrode; Grassel; Flechtorf near Fallersleben; Hattorf, Fallersleben; Schandelah; Dormettingen; Salem Borehole	Pollen	Affinities with Cheirolepidiaceae inside Coniferae. Abundant in the Lower Jurassic of North and Southern Europe, represents pollen of medium to large arborescent plants, specially conifers. The abundance of pollen of Classopollis and other thermophilic plants was observed in this region in the lower Toarcian from the end of the antiquum (= tenuicostatum) zone to the middle of commune zone. Classopollis is correlated with evaporites and are therefore associated with desert basins, but the shrubs may have also lived in xeric upland areas with seasonal fires. Evidence of fires is absent in the marine Posidonienschiefer, but has been recovered on the coeval nearshore calcareous sandstones. It increases with the appearance of charcoal phytoclasts, as derived from dry settings with increased wildfires.	
Clavatipollenites	C. palaeoserratus; C. spp.	Hondelage; Beienrode; Grassel; Schandelah	Pollen	Affinities with Gnetopsida and probably Gnetophyta. Has been considered pollen of Chloranthaceae. However, it is too old to belong to advanced angiosperms. It probably comes from cones related to the genus Piroconites kuesperti from the lowermost Jurassic of Germany, resembling pollen of extant Ephedra and Welwitschia.	Closer Look of Ephedra cones, a common gnetophyte. Clavatipollenites may come from a related plant
Concavisporites	C. cf. kaiseri; C. spp.	Dormettingen; Unken, samples 3-4	Spores	Affinities with Gleicheniaceae inside Gleicheniales. It suggests a relative increase of humidity on the rivers flowing towards the Austrian realm. The most abundant term spore in this region.	Dicranopteris, Concavisporites probably comes from similar genera
Crassipollenites	C. diffusus	Hondelage; Beienrode; Grassel; Schandelah	Pollen	Affinities with Cheirolepidiaceae and Araucariaceae inside Pinaceae. Uncertain affinities.	
Cyathidites	C. sp.	Hondelage; Beienrode; Grassel; Schandelah; Hattorf, Fallersleben; Flechtorf near Fallersleben	Spores	Affinities with the family Cyatheaceae inside Cyatheales. Likely from a tree fern.	Example of extant Cyathea, Cyathidites likely comes from similar genera
Cycadopites	C. cf. follicularis	Unken, samples 1-3	Pollen	Affinities with the Cycadopsida inside Cycadales. Pollen related with modern Cycas, arbustive to lower floor plants, relatively abundant, present in various of the measured samples. The most common pollen of the Austrian realm, alongside being an indicator of dry settings.	Encephalartos, Cycadopites come probably from similar genera
Deltoidosporites	D. spp.	Dormettingen; Salem Borehole; Unken, sample 5	Spores	Affinities with Dicksoniaceae inside Pteridopsida. Likely from a tree fern.	Modern Dicksonia, Deltoidosporites come probably from similar genera
Densosporites	D. spp.	Dormettingen	Spores	Affinities with the Selaginellaceae in the Lycopsida. Herbaceous lycophyte flora, similar to ferns, found in humid settings	Extant Selaginella, typical example of Selaginellaceae
Disaccites	D. reclusus; D. sp.	Hondelage; Beienrode; Grassel; Schandelah	Pollen	Affinities with Podocarpaceae inside Pinopsida. Pollen from arbustive to arborescent plants.	Extant Afrocarpus cone, example of the Podocarpaceae. Disaccites is similar to the pollen found in this genus
Exesipollenites	E. tumulus; E. spp.	Hondelage; Beienrode; Grassel; Schandelah; Hattorf, Fallersleben; Flechtorf near Fallersleben	Pollen	Affinities with the family Cupressaceae inside Pinopsida. Pollen resembles extant genera such as Actinostrobus and Austrocedrus, probably from dry environments.	Extant Austrocedrus. Exesipollenites likely comes from a related plant
Kraeuselisporites	K. reissingeri	Dormettingen	Spores	Affinities with Selaginellaceae and probably Lycopsida. A rare element in the palynological records of the German Basin, although more abundant than any other spore recovered locally.	
Inaperturopollenites	I. orbiculatus	Bisingen/Zimmern Borehole; Klein Lehmhagen pit, Grimmen	Pollen	Affinities with the Pinidae inside Coniferae. Abundant in the Lower Jurassic of NW Europe. Its identification in the Posidonienschiefer is rather unclear due to the bad preservation of the pollen grains.	Extant Pinus cembra cone, an example of the Pinidae. Inaperturopollenites is similar to the pollen found in this genus
Ischyosporites	I. cf. variegatus; I. sp	Unken, probes 4-5	Spores	Affinities with Pteridopsida. Spores from several types of ferns, relatively rare, present only in 2 samples.	
Leptolepidites	L. equatibossus; L. sp.	Dormettingen	Spores	Affinities with the family Dennstaedtiaceae in the Polypodiales. Forest fern spores.	Extant Dennstaedtia specimens; Leptolepidites probably comes from similar genera
Lycopodiacidites	L. infragranulatus	Unken, sample 3	Spores	Affinities with the Ophioglossaceae inside Filicopsida. Spores related with modern floor ferns, which appear on abundant water locations. The Unken Member is considered a more basinal deposit, where wood and sporomorph remains are more common.	Ophioglossum, Lycopodiacidites probably comes from similar genera
Osmundacidites	O. wellmanii; O. spp.	Dormettingen; Hondelage; Beienrode; Grassel; Schandelah; Hattorf, Fallersleben; Flechtorf near Fallersleben	Spores	Affinities with the family Osmundaceae inside Polypodiopsida. Found near fluvial currents, related to the modern Osmunda regalis	Example of extant Osmunda specimens, Osmundacidites probably comes from similar genera or maybe a species from the genus itself
Podocarpidites	P. ellipticus; P. sp.	Dormettingen	Pollen	Affinities with the Podocarpaceae inside Pinopsida. Conifer pollen from medium to large arborescent plants.	Extant Podocarpus. Podocarpidites may come from a related plant
Polycingulatisporites	P. spp.	Dormettingen	Spores	Affinities with the family Notothyladaceae inside Anthocerotopsida. Hornwort spores.	Example of extant Notothylas specimens
Quadraeculina	Q. anaellaeformis	Dormettingen	Pollen	Affinities with Podocarpaceae and Pinaceae inside Coniferophyta.	
Retitriletes	R.austroclavatidites	Dormettingen	Spores	Affinities with Lycopodiaceae inside Lycopsida.	
Spheripollenites	S.subgranulatus; S. sp.	Bisingen/Zimmern borehole; Klein Lehmhagen pit, Grimmen; Dormettingen; Salem Borehole	Pollen	Affinities with Cheirolepidiaceae inside Pinaceae. Abundant in the Lower Jurassic of NW Europe. Spheripollenites co-occurs on the coeval Sorthat Formation with cuticles of Dactyletrophyllum ramonensis, and after further study a highly significant correlation was found, which may suggest that the species S. psilatus was produced by the conifer genus Dactyletrophyllum.	
Stereisporites	S. psilatus	Dormettingen	Spores	Affinities with Sphagnaceae inside Sphagnopsida.	
Striatella	S. seebergensis; S. sp.	Dormettingen	Spores	Affinities with Polypodiaceae inside Filicopsida.	
Todisporites	T. major	Dormettingen	Spores	Affinities with Osmundaceae inside Filicopsida.	

=== Equisetaceae ===
Genus	Species	Location	Material	Notes	Images
Equisetites	E. cf. müensteri; E. cf. columnaris; E. cf. bunburyanus; E. cf. veronensis; E. sp.	Dudelange; Kerkhofen; Holzmaden; Hondelage; Schandelah; Grassel	Stems	Affinities with Equisetaceae inside Equisetopsida. A number of mostly very fragmented and not particularly well preserved, but clear horsetail remains have been described.	
Neocalamites	N. merianii; N. elegantulus; N. spp.	Aselfingen; Dudelange; Gomaringen; Holzmaden; Hondelange; Kerkhofen; Schandelah; Bascharange	Stems and incomplete axes	Affinities with Equisetaceae inside Equisetopsida. Neocalamites is one of the most common plants in all the Posidonia Shale.	

=== Ferns ===
Genus	Species	Location	Material	Notes	Images
Cladophlebis	C. minor	Dudelange	Frond	Affinities with Dicksoniaceae	

=== "Pteridospermatophyta" ===
Genus	Species	Location	Material	Notes	Images
Pachypteris	P. nordenskioeldii	Braunschweig	Frond	Affinities with Umkomasiaceae or Corystospermaceae.	Pachypteris from the Sachrang Formation
Sagenopteris	S. phillipsii	Dudelange	Frond	Affinities with Caytoniales.	

=== Bennettitales ===
Genus	Species	Location	Material	Notes	Images
Glossozamites	G. oblongifolius	Holzmaden; Dotternhausen	Leaflets	A member of Williamsoniaceae inside Bennettitales. Identified originally as Zamites oblongifolius	
Otozamites	O. gracilis; O. bechei; O. reglei; O. cf. thomasii; O. sp.	Dotternhausen; Dudelange; Holzmaden; Ohmden; Hondelange; Bascharage	Leaflets	Affinities with Cycadeoidaceae inside Bennettitales. It is the most abundant non conifer plant fossil in the environment.	Otozamites gracilis specimen from the Sachrang Formation
Pterophyllum	P. acutifolium; P. subaequale	Dotternhausen; Dudelange; Holzmaden; Altdorf	Leaflets	Affinities with Cycadeoidaceae inside Bennettitales. Some specimens were assigned to "Dioonites acutifolium".	Pterophyllum fossil
Ptilophyllum	P. gracilis; P. pecten; P. sp.	Dotternhausen; Dudelange; Holzmaden	Leaflets	Affinities with Williamsoniaceae inside Bennettitales.	Ptilophyllum sp. specimen from the Sachrang Formation
Zamites	Z. mandelslohi; Z. spp.	Altdorf; Banz; Dotternhausen; Dudelange; Holzmaden; Irlbach	Leaflets	A member of Williamsoniaceae inside Bennettitales.	Zamites mandelslohi specimen

=== Ginkgoales ===
Genus	Species	Location	Material	Notes	Images
Ginkgoites	G. digitata; G. sp.	Dudelange; Schandelah; Ohmden	Leaf compressions	Affinities with Ginkgoaceae inside Ginkgoales.	

=== Pinophyta ===
Genus	Species	Location	Material	Notes	Images
Brachyphyllum	B. sp.	Dudelange; Holzmaden; Hondelange; Schandelah	Branched shoots	Affinities with Araucariaceae or Cheirolepidiaceae inside Pinales.	
Conites	"C." supraliasicus	Hondelange	Seed cones	Affinities with Araucariaceae or Cheirolepidiaceae inside Pinales. The genus sepresents various kinds of cones from diverse conifer origin.	
aff.Frenelopsis	aff. F. sp.	Dudelange	Branched shoots	Affinities with Cheirolepidiaceae.	
Hirmeriella	H. sp.	Dotternhausen	Ovuliferous dwarf-shoots	Affinities with Cheirolepidiaceae.	
Pagiophyllum	P. kurri; P. araucarinum; P. falcatum; P. sp.	Aselfingen; Dotternhausen; Dudelange; Gomaringen; Holzmaden; Ohmden; Irlbach; Hondelange; Mistelgau; Schandelah; Bascharange; Wendhausen	Branched shoots	Affinities with Araucariaceae or Cheirolepidiaceae inside Pinales. Pagiophyllum araucarinum predominates among the types of leafy coniferous branches found locally.	Pagiophyllum kurri specimen from Banz
Widdringtonites	W. liasicus; W. reichii; cf. W. spp.	Dudelange; Holzmaden; Irlbach; Ohmden	Branched Shoots	A possible ancestral member of the Callitroideae inside Cupressaceae, or a member of Cheirolepidiaceae. Named also "Cupressites" liasicus, probably represents an arbustive to arborescent-derived axis.	Widdringtonites liasicus specimen from the Sachrang Formation

=== Fossil wood ===
Fossil wood amount increases in the marginal Unken Member, with great amounts of logs and fragments more than 1 m long. Surface studies suggest relationships with the wood genera identified on the coeval Úrkút Manganese Ore Formation.

Genus	Species	Location	Material	Notes	Images
Agathoxylon	cf. A. sp.	Dotternhausen; Dudelange; Holzmaden; Ohmden	Wood	Affinities with Araucariaceae inside Pinales. One of the largest known rafting wood specimens in the fossil record is assigned to this genus, with a length of 18 m.	Araucarioxylon (=Agathoxylon) reconstruction
Araucariopitys	A. nicri; A. tubingense; A. sp.	Dotternhausen; Ohmden; Holzmaden	Wood	Affinities with Abietinae inside Pinales.	Abies specimen, whose role was probably shared by the makers of the Araucariopitys woods.
Circoporoxylon	C. grandiporosum	Braunschweig area; GroßGschaidt near Erlangen	Wood	Affinities with Podocarpaceae inside Pinales.	
Cupressinoxylon	C. sp.	Reutlingen; Holzmaden; Ohmden; Dotternhausen	Wood	Affinities with Cupressaceae inside Pinales.	Metasequoia specimen, whose role was probably shared by the makers of the Cupressinoxylon woods.
Podocarpoxylon	P. sp.; cf. P. sp.	"Georg-Friedrich" mine not far from Liebenberg near Grauhof in the Harz foreland; Wenzen between Einbeck and Alfeld; Mistelgau; Altdorf	Wood	Affinities with Podocarpaceae inside Pinales.	Podocarpoxylon specimen
Protocupressinoxylon	P. catenatum; P. liasinum	Mistlegau; Hondelange; Glasser; Kerkhofen; Altdorf; Holzmaden; Ohmden	Wood	Affinities with Cheirolepidiaceae inside Pinales.	Protocupressinoxylon catenatum specimen
Protophyllocladoxylon	P. quedlinburgense; P. franconicum	Kerkhofen; Altdorf; Meilenhofen; Dörlbach	Wood	Affinities with Podocarpaceae or Cupressaceae inside Pinales.	Bivalves attached to a Protophyllocladoxylon driftwood
"Protopinaceae" indet.	Indeterminate	Hondelange; Beienrode; Schandelah; Holzmaden; Ohmden; Dotternhausen	Wood	Wood of the Protopinaceae, a possible "morpho-group" of the family Cheirolepidiaceae.	
Phyllocladoxylon	P. sp.	Hondelange; Hattorf; Holzmaden; Ohmden; Altdorf	Wood	Affinities with Podocarpaceae inside Pinales.	
Taxodioxylon	cf. T. sp.	Altdorf; Korbach; Hondelange; Holzmaden; Ohmden; Dotternhausen	Wood	Affinities with the Cupressaceae inside Pinales.	
Xenoxylon	X. phyllocladoides; X. cf. barberi; X. ellipticum	Braunschweig area; Taught near Hanover; Dörnten not far from Liebenburg, district of Goslar	Wood	Affinities with Pinophyta, likely close to the Podocarpaceae, Cupressaceae and in a lesser extent to the Cheirolepidiaceae. Finally it may be a member of the extinct family Miroviaceae.	
