= Agoudim Formation =

Geological formation in Morocco

- Stratigraphic range: Toarcian–Bajocian 184–168 Ma
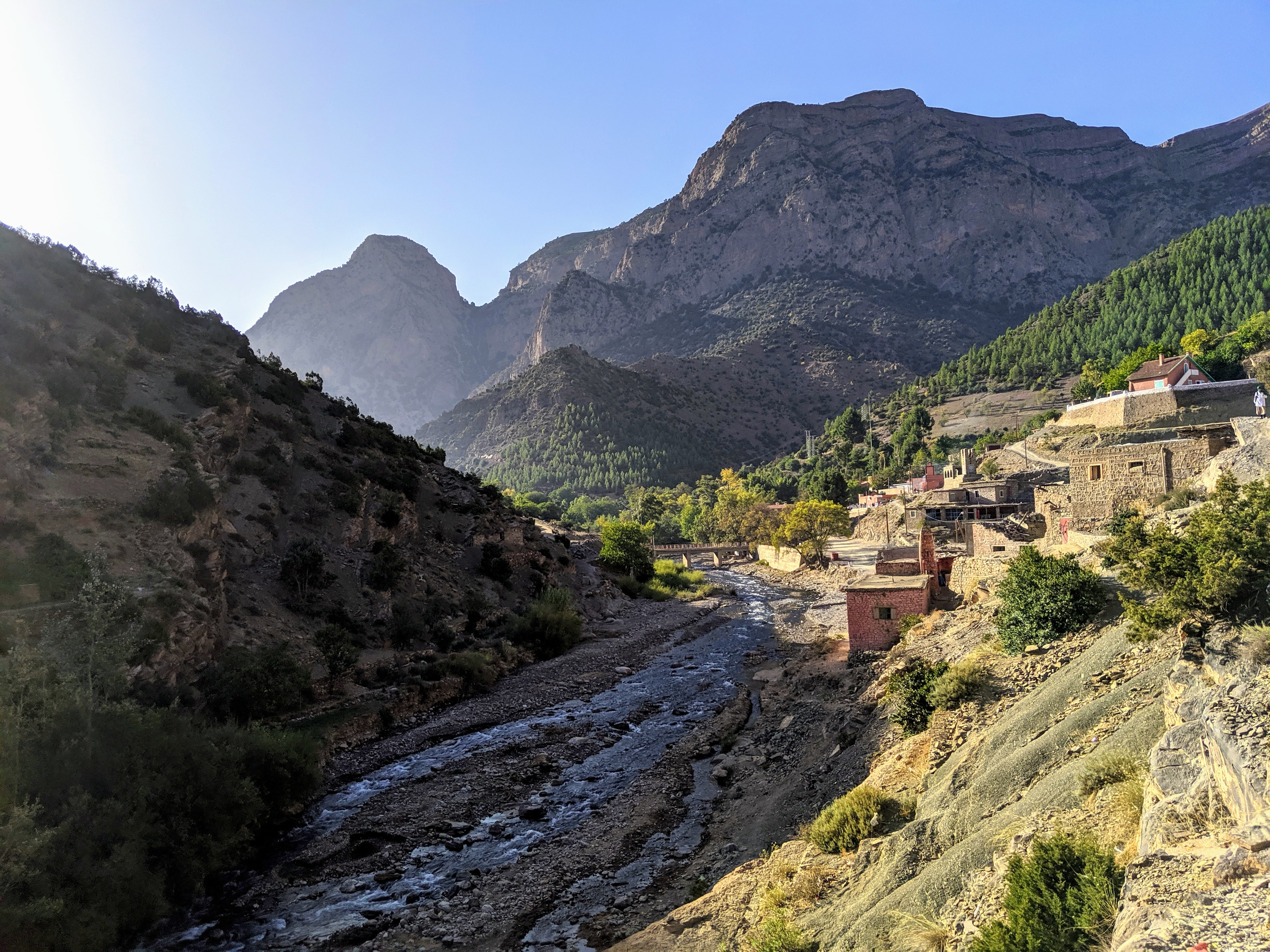
- Agoudim village
- Type: Geological Formation
- Underlies: R'cifa Formation
- Overlies: Tagoudite Formation; Jbel Ouchbis Formation; Jbel Aberdouz Formation; Jbel Choucht Formation
- Thickness: 2,000 m (6,600 ft) (up to 5,000 m (16,000 ft) reported)

Lithology
- Primary: Marl, Marly Limestone, Bioclastic limestone

Location
- Location: Er-Rich
- Coordinates: 32.25°N 4.50°W
- Approximate paleocoordinates: 27.0°N 3.0°W
- Region: High Atlas and Middle Atlas
- Country: Morocco

Type section
- Named for: Agoudim
- Named by: M. Studer
- Year defined: 1980
- Region: Er-Rich, Midelt Province
- Thickness at type section: ~4,500–5,000 m (14,800–16,400 ft)
- Agoudim Formation (Morocco)

The Agoudim Formation (also known as the "Marnes et Marno-Calcaires d'Agoudim") is a geological formation of Toarcian to Bajocian (Lower–Middle Jurassic) age in the central High Atlas and Middle Atlas (particularly around Rich and extending to areas like Midelt, Boulemane, and Beni Mellal) of Morocco. The formation is also known as the "Formation Marneuse d’Amane-Ilila", "Marnes de Boulemane", "Marnes de Taffert" and "Calcaires à Cancellophycus".

== Description ==
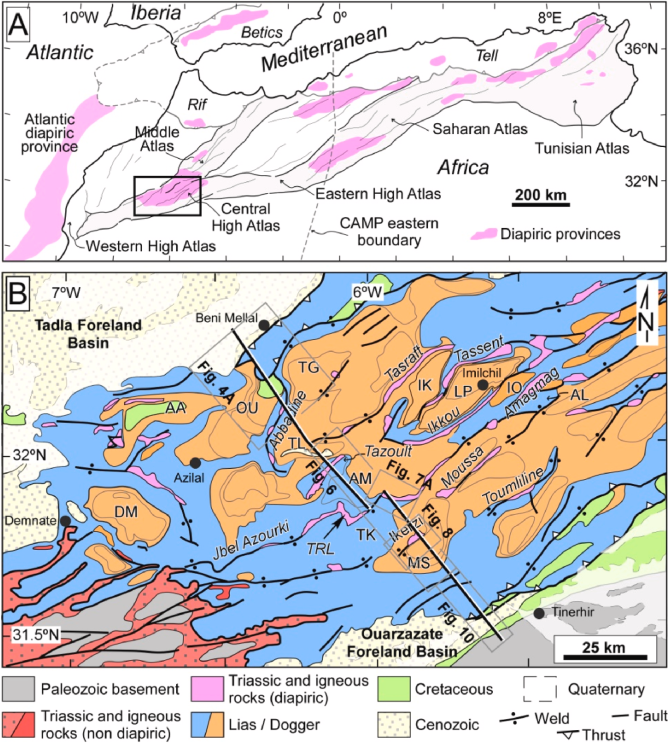
Location of the High Atlas basin and Geological overview of the main sectors

The Agoudim Formation is a substantial geological unit primarily composed of marls and marly limestones, representing a continuation from the underlying Tagoudite or Jbel Ouchbis formations and marking a significant shift toward more clay-rich (argillaceous) sedimentation. Tagoudite is mostly restricted to the central High Atlas, were Agoudim doesn´t show until up in the Middle Toarcian, yet more at the E Tagoudite starts to disappear, like at the Cirque de Jaafar, SW of Midelt or more at the E at Bou Redine Gorges, and Agoudim directly overlies the Pliensbachian. This shift is periodically interrupted by layers of bioclastic material (deposits rich in shell fragments and other organic debris) that increase in both frequency and thickness moving upward through the formation. It is stratigraphically divided into two main members: a lower marly member dominated by gray-blue marls with occasional nodular bioclastic limestone beds, and an upper member characterized by more calcareous and bioclastic rocks with greater lithological variability. The boundary between these members is often marked by a distinctive layer of organogenic turbidites, notably the "Calcaires à Cancellophycus", which forms a prominent brown cuesta and serves as an important marker horizon for geological mapping.

The lower member consists of monotonous, micritic marls that reflect relatively quiet hemipelagic depositional conditions, where fine clay and carbonate mud settled along with benthic material. This distal sedimentation was influenced by intermittent turbiditic currents transporting detrital quartz and glauconite, indicating periodic sediment input from nearby land areas and submarine slopes. In contrast, the upper member shows increasingly energetic conditions with cycles of sedimentation starting with lumachellic limestones (shell-rich limestones with oblique lamination) and ending in thick bioclastic marls. This member records frequent synsedimentary slumps and spectacular deformation structures like ball-and-pillow folds (phacoids), which are indicative of tectonic instability and sediment loading on unstable slopes. The evolution upward culminates with a thick limestone cap dominated by oolitic limestones and bioherms (reef-like carbonate buildups that further highlight the transition to shallower marine conditions).

== Paleoenvironment ==
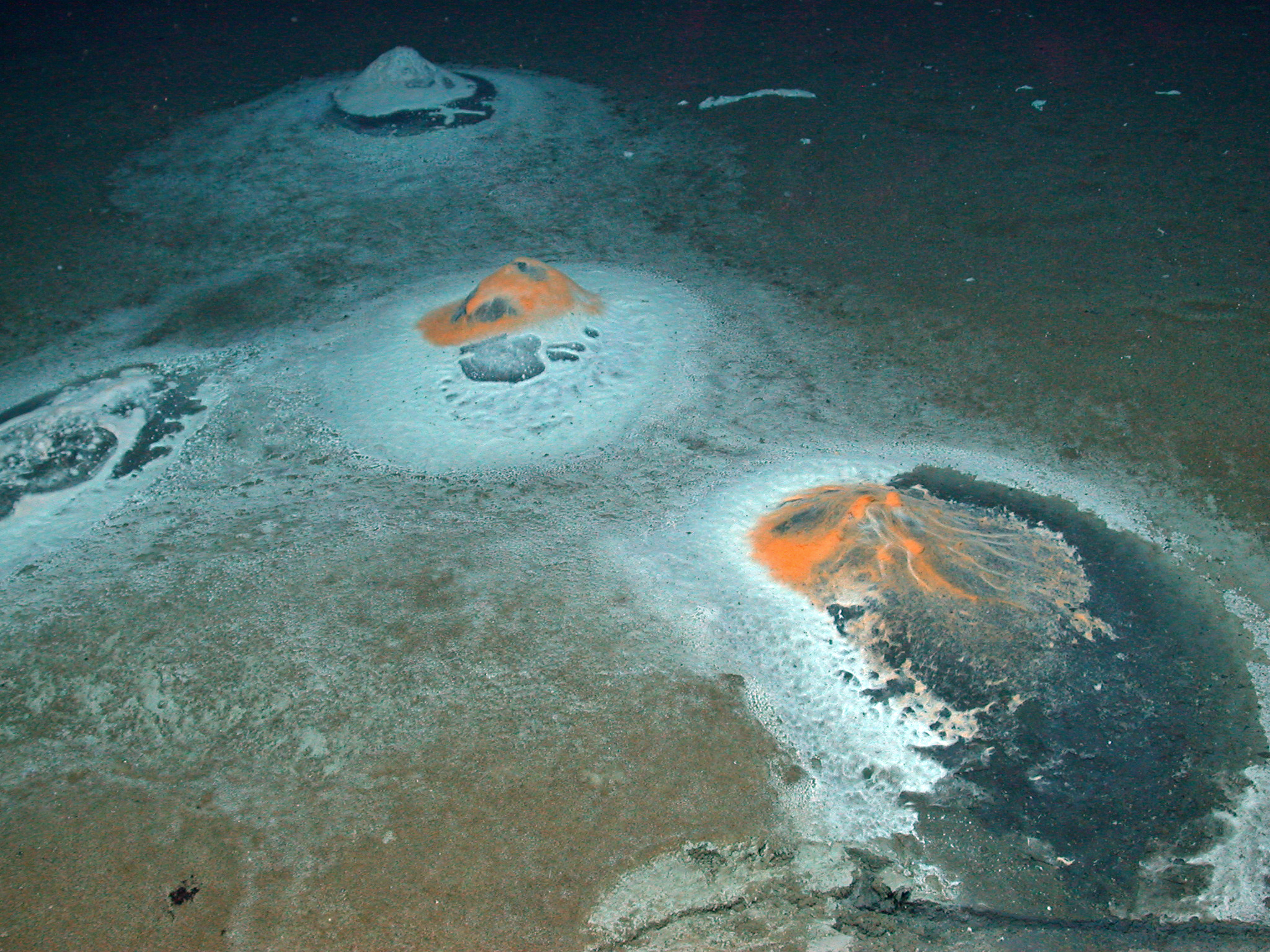
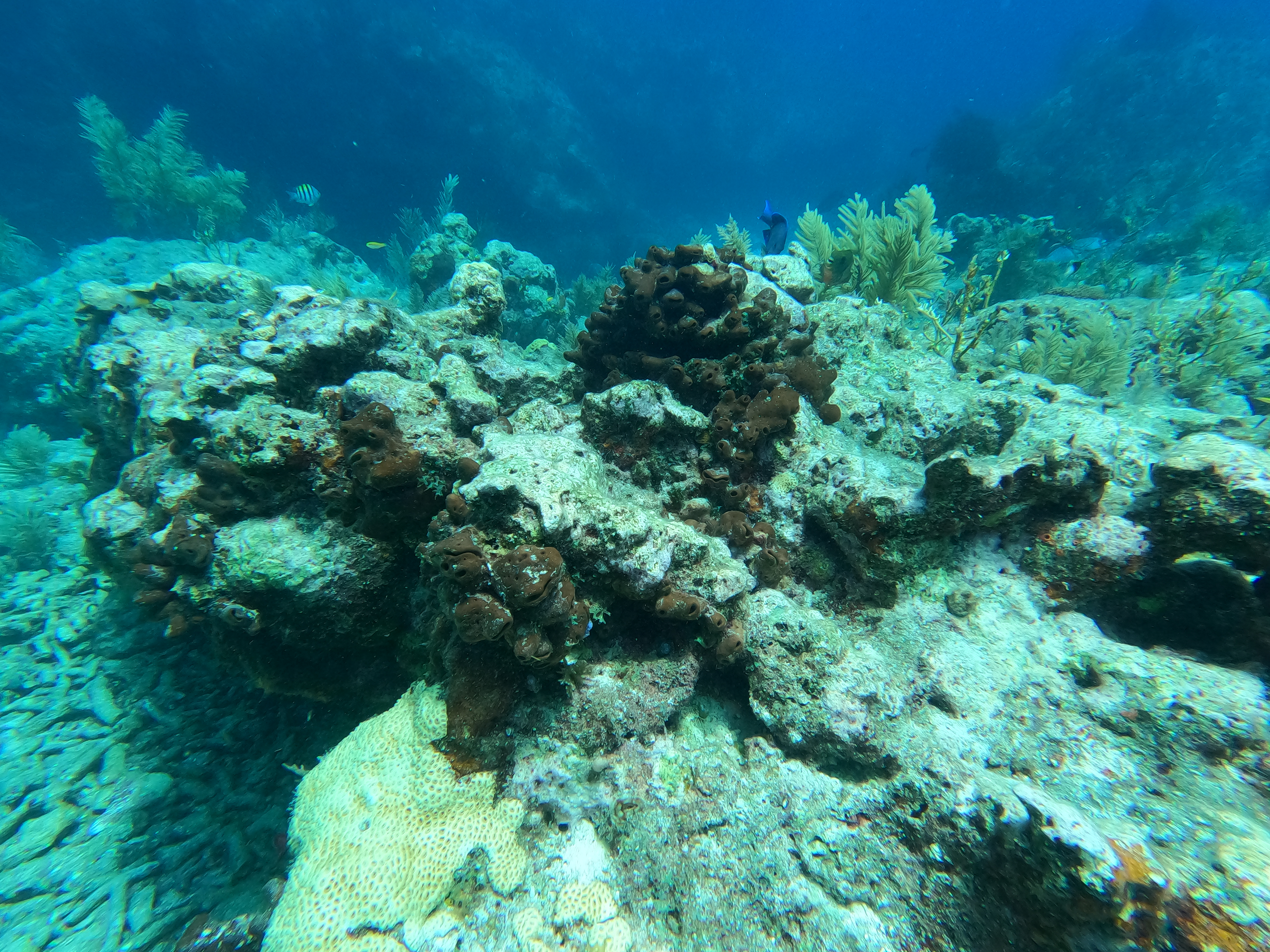
The Agoudim Formation records multiple Paleoenvironments in a Shallowing basin, from Cold Seep deposits to shallower Reefs

The Agoudim Formation records a progressive transition from deep to shallow marine settings under the influence of rifting, subsidence, and environmental perturbations in a Diapiric Rift Basin. The lower marly members were deposited in hemipelagic conditions below storm wave base, with pelagic sedimentation, fine siliciclastic influx from nearby uplifts, and reworked carbonate from Liassic platforms. Fossils such as ammonites, radiolarians, foraminifera, small bivalves, and echinoderm debris confirm a low-energy offshore environment. Rapid subsidence and sea-level rise during the Early Bajocian led to a drowning phase of the neritic carbonate factory, favoring marl sedimentation locally enriched in organic matter. Within these successions, several intervals of authigenic carbonates developed, notably yellow micritic nodules, tubular and chimney-like concretions, and conical chemoherms, interpreted as the record of hydrocarbon Cold seep. Petrographic, isotopic, and sedimentological evidence indicates that the second and third authigenic horizons formed at active seep sites, with feeder-pipes, carbonate crusts, microbialites, and bioclast-rich infills, while the yellow nodules of the lower interval likely reflect organic matter remineralization without direct seepage. Strongly depleted Δ13C values (down to −19‰) point to fluids rich in dissolved inorganic carbon generated by organic matter degradation, likely through bacterial sulfate reduction and anaerobic oxidation of hydrocarbons, rather than pure methane seepage. These processes created localized hardgrounds, serpulidae and oyster colonization, and chemoherm buildups on the seafloor. As sedimentation continued, carbonate production recovered, and three reefal complexes developed, ranging from microbial-coral patch reefs to larger coral–sponge–algal bioherms, accompanied by ooid–peloid shoals and brachiopod-rich limestones. These buildups evolved from small mounds to coalescing reefs, shaped by constructive growth, storm reworking, bioerosion, and micritization. The upper part of the formation is dominated by shallow platform deposits with abundant brachiopods, gastropods, corals, and reefal frameworks. Some areas, like the Agoudim valley record excepcionally preserved platform sections, showing it´s inner ramp had high-energy ooid–peloid shoals, microbial mounds, and small patch reefs and a proximal middle ramp with mixed coral–sponge–bryozoan–brachiopod assemblages in lower energy waters. The distal ramp consisted of marl–limestone alternations with storm beds and oyster–coral–sponge buildups. Local syndepositional highs and terrigenous input created semi-restricted zones with fluctuating oxygenation and nutrients.

== Biota ==
=== Foranimifera ===
Taxa	Species	Locality	Member	Material	Notes	Images
Ammobaculites	fontinensis	Talghemt Ridge	II-IV	Tests	Lituolidae	
Ammobaculites	agglutinans	Assameur n’Aït Fergane; Bou Kendill; Jbel Tazigzaout; Ifrda n’Tizguienne; Assameur n’Baknou-Aferdoun’Achi	II	Tests	Lituolidae	
Bullopora	sp.	Jebel Bou Kendill	III	Tests	Polymorphinidae	
Citharina	serratocostata	Talghemt Ridge	IV	Tests	Vaginulinidae	
Citharina	sp.	Talghemt Ridge	I-II	Tests	Vaginulinidae	
Eoguttulina	bilocularis	Assameur n’Aït Fergane; Bou Kendill; Jbel Tazigzaout; Ifrda n’Tizguienne; Assameur n’Baknou-Aferdoun’Achi	II	Tests	Polymorphinidae	
Eoguttulina	sp.	Talghemt Ridge	IV	Tests	Polymorphinidae	
Epistommina	mosquensis	Assameur n’Aït Fergane; Bou Kendill; Jbel Tazigzaout; Ifrda n’Tizguienne; Assameur n’Baknou-Aferdoun’Achi	II-IV	Tests	Epistomininae	
Flabellammina	althoffi	Assameur n’Aït Fergane; Bou Kendill; Jbel Tazigzaout; Ifrda n’Tizguienne; Assameur n’Baknou-Aferdoun’Achi; Talghemt Ridge	III-IV	Tests	Lituolidae	
Garantella	ampasindavaensis	Assameur n’Aït Fergane; Bou Kendill; Jbel Tazigzaout; Ifrda n’Tizguienne; Assameur n’Baknou-Aferdoun’Achi	II	Tests	Epistomininae	
Garantella	stellata	Assameur n’Aït Fergane; Bou Kendill; Jbel Tazigzaout; Ifrda n’Tizguienne; Assameur n’Baknou-Aferdoun’Achi	II	Tests	Epistomininae	
Garantella	sp.	Assameur n’Aït Fergane; Bou Kendill; Jbel Tazigzaout; Ifrda n’Tizguienne; Assameur n’Baknou-Aferdoun’Achi	II	Tests	Epistomininae	
Haplophragmium	subaequale	Assameur n’Aït Fergane; Bou Kendill; Jbel Tazigzaout; Ifrda n’Tizguienne; Assameur n’Baknou-Aferdoun’Achi; Talghemt Ridge	III-IV	Tests	Lituolidae	
Haplophragmium	aequale	Assameur n’Aït Fergane; Bou Kendill; Jbel Tazigzaout; Ifrda n’Tizguienne; Assameur n’Baknou-Aferdoun’Achi	III-IV	Tests	Lituolidae	
Ichthyolaria	carinata	Talghemt Ridge	I	Tests	Ichthyolariidae	
Ichthyolaria	gr. major	Talghemt Ridge	I	Tests	Ichthyolariidae	
Ichthyolaria	sp.	Talghemt Ridge	I	Tests	Ichthyolariidae	
Lenticulina	argonauta	Assameur n’Aït Fergane; Bou Kendill; Jbel Tazigzaout; Ifrda n’Tizguienne; Assameur n’Baknou-Aferdoun’Achi; Talghemt Ridge	IV	Tests	Nodosariidae	
Lenticulina	chicheryi	Talghemt Ridge	I-II	Tests	Nodosariidae	
Lenticulina	d'orbignyi	Talghemt Ridge	I-II	Tests	Nodosariidae	
Lenticulina	münsteri	Assameur n’Aït Fergane; Bou Kendill; Jbel Tazigzaout; Ifrda n’Tizguienne; Assameur n’Baknou-Aferdoun’Achi; Talghemt Ridge	I-II	Tests	Nodosariidae	
Lenticulina	quenstedti	Talghemt Ridge	IV	Tests	Nodosariidae	
Lenticulina	subalata	Assameur n’Aït Fergane; Bou Kendill; Jbel Tazigzaout; Ifrda n’Tizguienne; Assameur n’Baknou-Aferdoun’Achi; Talghemt Ridge	I-II	Tests	Nodosariidae	
Lenticulina	toarcense	Talghemt Ridge	I	Tests	Nodosariidae	
Lenticulina	polymorpha	Assameur n’Aït Fergane; Bou Kendill; Jbel Tazigzaout; Ifrda n’Tizguienne; Assameur n’Baknou-Aferdoun’Achi	III-IV	Tests	Nodosariidae	
Parurgonina	sp.	Assameur n’Aït Fergane; Bou Kendill; Jbel Tazigzaout; Ifrda n’Tizguienne; Assameur n’Baknou-Aferdoun’Achi	III-IV	Tests	Parurgoninidae	
Planularia	sp.	Talghemt Ridge	IV	Tests	Vaginulinidae	
Proteonina	gr. difflugiformis	Talghemt Ridge	IV	Tests	Hormosinidae	
Protoglobigerina?	spp.	Talghemt Ridge	I-III	Tests	Globigerinidae	
Pseudonodosaria	gr. pygmea	Talghemt Ridge	I	Tests	Nodosariidae	
Pseudonodosaria	multicostata	Talghemt Ridge	I	Tests	Nodosariidae	
Reinholdella	dreheri	Assameur n’Aït Fergane; Bou Kendill; Jbel Tazigzaout; Ifrda n’Tizguienne; Assameur n’Baknou-Aferdoun’Achi	III-IV	Tests	Ceratobuliminidae	
Spirillina	orbicula	Talghemt Ridge	I-II	Tests	Spirillinidae	
Textularia	jurassica	Talghemt Ridge	IV	Tests	Textulariidae	
Trochammina	globigeriniformis	Talghemt Ridge	IV	Tests	Trochamminidae	
Verneuilinoides	cf. subvitreus	Talghemt Ridge	I-II	Tests	Verneuilinidae	

=== Ichnotaxa ===
Ichnogenus	Ichnospecies	Locality	Member	Made by	Images
Chondrites	isp.	Assameur, Jebel Taferdout	III-IV	Polychaeta; Sipuncula	Example of Chondrites trace fossil
Planolites	isp.	Assameur, Jebel Taferdout	III-IV	Annelids; Bivalves; Arthropods	Example of Planolites specimens.
Phycodes	isp.	Assameur, Jebel Taferdout	III-IV	Arenicolidae; Capitellidae; Sipuncula; Spionida	
Thalassinoides	isp.	Jebel Bou Kendill	III	Actinopteri; Anomura; Decapoda; Dipnoi; Polychaeta; Sipuncula	Thalassinoides from France
Trypanites	isp.	Assameur, Jebel Taferdout	III-IV	Arenicolidae; Capitellidae; Sipuncula; Spionida	
Zoophycos	(Cancellophycus) ispp.	Amellago; Talghemt Ridge; Assameur n’Aït Fergane; Bou Kendill; Jbel Tazigzaout; Ifrda n’Tizguienne; Assameur n’Baknou-Aferdoun’Achi	I-IV	Arenicolidae; Capitellidae; Sipuncula; Spionida; Echinoidea	Zoophycos fossil from Kentucky

=== Brachiopoda ===
Taxa	Species	Locality	Member	Material	Notes	Images
Acanthothiris	oligocantha	Rich (syncline of Jebel Bou Kendill)	II	Shells	Athyrididae	
Acanthothiris	tenuispina	Rich (syncline of Jebel Bou Kendill)	III	Shells	Athyrididae	
Cymatorhynchia	quadriplicata	Jebel Assameur; Boukendil; Rich-Gourrama area	IV	Shells	Tetrarhynchiidae	
Kallirhynchia	concinna	Amellago, Talghemt Ridge	I	Shells	Rhynchonellidae	
Loboidothyris	sp.	Rich (syncline of Jebel Bou Kendill)	II	Shells	Loboidothyrididae	
Lophrothyris	contracta	Rich (syncline of Jebel Bou Kendill)	II	Shells	Terebratulidae	
Monsardithyris	cortonensis	Rich (syncline of Jebel Bou Kendill)	III	Shells	Terebratulidae	
Monsardithyris	ventricosa	Assameur n’Ait Fergane	IV	Shells	Terebratulidae	
Monsardithyris	sp. cf. M. loubensis	Bou-Ouchène (northern platform); Rich	III	Shells	Terebratulidae	
Quadratirhynchia	vasconcellosi	Amellago	I	Shells	Tetrarhynchiidae	
Rhactorhynchia	distracta	Rich (syncline of Jebel Bou Kendill)	III	Shells	Rhynchonellidae	
Rhynchonelloidea	goyi	Amellago	I	Shells	Rhynchonellidae	
Rugitela	cf. hughesi	Rich (syncline of Jebel Bou Kendill)	II–III	Shells	Zeilleriidae	
Zeilleria	truncatella	Rich (syncline of Jebel Bou Kendill)	III	Shells	Zeilleriidae	
Zeilleria	perlata	Assameur n’Ait Fergane, Boukendil	IV	Shells	Zeilleriidae	

=== Bryozoa ===
Genus	Species	Locality	Member	Material	Notes	Images
Berenicea	sp.	Boukendil, Assameur	IV	Colonies	Bereniceidae	
Collapora	cf. straminea	Boukendil	IV	Colonies	Atactotoechidae	
Entalophora	cf. stokesi	Boukendil	IV	Colonies	Entalophoridae	

=== Cnidaria ===
Genus	Species	Locality	Member	Material	Notes	Images
Acropora	cf.sp.	Assameur n’Ait Fergane, Boukendil	IV	Colonies	Acroporidae	Extant specimen
Aggomorphastraea	"sp. 1"	Amellago	I	Colonies	Latomeandridae	
Allocoenia	"sp. 1"	Amellago	I	Colonies	Actinastreidae	
Allocoenia	"sp. 2"	Amellago	I	Colonies	Actinastreidae	
Ampakabastrea	ampakabensis	Amellago	I	Colonies	Astrocoeniidae	
Cladophyllia	sp.	Assameur n’Ait Fergane; Imilchil	I-IV	Colonies	Caryophylliidae	
Comophyllia	sp.	Assameur n’Ait Fergane	IV	Colonies	Comophylliidae	Comophyllia Fossil
Complexastrea	"sp. 1"	Amellago	I	Colonies	Thecosmiliidae	
Cyathocoenia	faugeresi	Amellago	I	Colonies	Actinastreidae	
Cyathocoenia	"sp. 1"	Amellago	I	Colonies	Actinastreidae	
Dendrarea	sp.	Assameur n’Ait Fergane	IV	Colonies	Scleractinia (family uncertain)	
Dasmosmilia	"sp. 1"	Amellago	I	Colonies	Dermosmiliidae	Dasmosmilia Fossil
Dimorpharaea	sp.	Assameur n’Ait Fergane	IV	Colonies	Scleractinia (family uncertain)	
Edwardoseris	sp.	Assameur n’Ait Fergane	IV	Colonies	Scleractinia (family uncertain)	
Enallocoenia	"sp. 1"	Amellago	I	Colonies	Actinastreidae	
Isastrea	sp.	Assameur n’Ait Fergane	IV	Colonies	Latomeandridae/Montlivaltiidae	Fossil Isastrea
Isastrea	"sp. 1"	Amellago	I	Colonies	Latomeandridae	Fossil Isastrea
Kobymeandra	sp.	Assameur n’Ait Fergane	IV	Colonies	Scleractinia (family uncertain)	
Latiastrea	"sp. 1"	Amellago	I	Colonies	Latomeandridae	
Lochmaeosmilia	sp.	Imilchil	I	Colonies	Calamophylliidae	
Microphyllia	irregularis	Amellago	I	Colonies	Latomeandridae	
Montlivaltia	sp.	Assameur n’Ait Fergane	IV	Coralla	Montlivaltiidae (solitary)	
Polystylidium	sp.	Assameur n’Ait Fergane	IV	Colonies	Scleractinia (family uncertain)	
Stylosmilia	sp.	Foum Zabel (southern margin)	II-III	Colonies	Thecosmiliidae	
Stylosmilia	"sp. 1"	Amellago	I	Colonies	Thecosmiliidae	
Thecocyathus	mactrus	Amellago	I	Solitary corallites	Caryophylliidae	
Vallimeandropsis	lineata	Amellago	I	Colonies	Scleractinia (family uncertain)	

=== Porifera ===
Genus	Species	Locality	Member	Material	Notes	Images
Cheilosporites	tirolensis	Assameur, Jebel Taferdout	IV	Sponge body fossils	Vaceletidan	
Cheilosporites	spp.	Assameur, Jebel Taferdout	IV	Sponge body fossils	Vaceletidan	
Cladocoropsis	spp.	Boukendil, Assameur	IV	Sponge body fossils	Axinellidan	Extant relative, Axinella
Eudea	cf. globata	Boukendil, Assameur	IV	Sponge body fossils	Stellispongiida	
Neuropora	spp.	Imilchil	I	Sponge body fossils	Neuroporidae	

=== Mollusks ===
Taxa	Species	Locality	Member	Material	Notes	Images
Actinostreon	sp.	Assameur n’Ait Fergane, Boukendil	IV	Shells	Gryphaeidae	
Alocolytoceras	ophioneum	Gheris Valley	I	Shells	Lytoceratidae	
Alocolytoceras	dorcadis	Ait El Abbas; Azag	I	Shells	Lytoceratidae	
Alocolytoceras	sp.	Azag	I	Shells	Lytoceratidae	
Ambersites	sp.	Rich region	II–III	Shells	Hammatoceratidae	
Amphitrochus	abbas	Rich region; Outarbat	III-IV	Shells	Nododelphinulidae	
Ancolioceras	opalinoides	n’Zala (Jbel Aouja)	I–II	Shells	Graphoceratidae	
Asthenoceras	sp.	Rich (Concavum–Discites zones)	II–III	Shells	Sonniniidae	
Belemnopsis	baculiformis	Iwansitn	III	Rostra	Belemnopseidae	
Belemnopsis	pougatchevskae	Iwansitn	III	Rostra	Belemnopseidae	
Bositra	buchi	Amellago; Rich	I–III	Shells	Posidoniidae	
Botula	sp.	Boukendil area	IV	Shells, borings	Mytilidae	
Bradfordia	costata	Rich region	III	Shells	Oppeliidae	
Bradfordia	sp.	Rich region	III	Shells	Oppeliidae	
Calabribelus	combemoreli	Rich (Jbel Bou Kandil), Iwansitn (Middle Atlas)	II–III	Rostra	Holcobelidae	
Calabribelus	tetramerus	Rich, Iwansitn	II–III	Rostra	Holcobelidae	
Calliphylloceras	nilssoni	Amellago	I	Shells	Phylloceratidae	
Calliphylloceras	cf.capitanii	Azag	I-II	Shells	Phylloceratidae	
Calliphylloceras	sp.	Azag	I-II	Shells	Phylloceratidae	
Catacoeloceras	sp.	Ait El Abbas	I	Shells	Dactylioceratidae	
Catulloceras	sp.	n’Zala (Jbel Aouja)	I	Shells	Graphoceratidae	
Chlamys	sp.	Rich, Amellago; Imilchil	I-II–III	Shells	Pectinidae	
Cirrus	sp.	Aberdouz	III-IV	Shells	Cirridae	
Conobelemnopsis	sp. A	Rich, Iwansitn	III	Rostra	Belemnopseidae	
Collina	gemma	Ait El Abbas; Azag	I	Shells	Dactylioceratidae	
Collina	cf.nummularia	Ait El Abbas	I	Shells	Dactylioceratidae	
Collina	linae	Ait El Abbas	I	Shells	Dactylioceratidae	
Collina	sp.	Azag	I	Shells	Dactylioceratidae	
Cotteswoldia	sp.	n’Zala (Jbel Aouja)	I	Shells	Graphoceratidae	
Crassiceras	cf.latum	Ait El Abbas	I	Shells	Hildoceratidae	
Ctenostreon	sp.	Rich, Amellago	II–III	Shells	Limidae	
Cypholioceras	sp.	n’Zala (Jbel Aouja)	II	Shells	Graphoceratidae	
Dactylioceras	(Eodactylites) mirabile	Amellago	I	Shells	Dactylioceratidae	Dactylioceras reconstruction
Dactylioceras	(Eodactylites) pseudocommune	Amellago	I	Shells	Dactylioceratidae	Dactylioceras reconstruction
Dactylioceras	(Eodactylites) simplex	Talghemt Ridge	I	Shells	Dactylioceratidae	Dactylioceras reconstruction
Dactylioceras	(Orthodactylites) aff. crosbeyi	Amellago	I	Shells	Dactylioceratidae	Dactylioceras reconstruction
Dactylioceras	(Orthodactylites) cf. semiannulatum	Amellago	I	Shells	Dactylioceratidae	Dactylioceras reconstruction
Dactylioceras	(Orthodactylites) andaluciensis	Agounou	I	Shells	Dactylioceratidae	Dactylioceras reconstruction
Dactylioceras	sp.	Ait El Abbas	I	Shells	Dactylioceratidae	Dactylioceras reconstruction
?Dicoelites	sp. A	Iwansitn	III	Rostra	Dicoelitidae	
Discohelix	subaequalis	Rich region; Outarbat	III-IV	Shells	Discohelicidae	
Discohelix	pulchrior	Rich region	IV	Shells	Discohelicidae	
Discohelix	sp.	Rich region	IV	Shells	Discohelicidae	
Docidoceras	wysogorskii	Rich	III	Shells	Otoitidae	
Eleganticeras	exaratum	Amellago	I	Shells	Dactylioceratidae	
Eleganticeras	sp.	Amellago	I	Shells	Dactylioceratidae	
Emileia	(Emileia) polymera	Boukendil, Assameur	IV	Shells	Otoitidae	
Eucyclus	ornatus	Rich region	IV	Shells	Eucyclidae	
Eucyclus	sp.	Aberdouz	III	Shells	Eucyclidae	
Eucycloidea	(Pseudalaria?) subangulata	Rich region	IV	Shells	Eucyclidae	
Eucycloidea	cf. etheridgii	Rich region; Outarbat	III-IV	Shells	Eucyclidae	
Eudmetoceras	flexuosum	Rich	II–III	Shells	Hammatoceratidae	
Eudmetoceras	masticonense	Rich	III	Shells	Hammatoceratidae	
Eudmetoceras	eudmetum	Rich	III	Shells	Hammatoceratidae	
Eudmetoceras	sp.	Rich	II–III	Shells	Hammatoceratidae	
Euaptetoceras	amaltheiforme	Rich	III	Shells	Hammatoceratidae	
Euaptetoceras	amplectens	Rich	III	Shells	Hammatoceratidae	
Euaptetoceras	sp.	Rich	II–III	Shells	Hammatoceratidae	
Fontannesia	aurita	Rich	II	Shells	Sonniniidae	
Fontannesia	montillanensis	Rich	II	Shells	Sonniniidae	
Fontannesia	sp.	Rich	II–III	Shells	Sonniniidae	
Furloceras	cf.chelussii	Ait El Abbas	I	Shells	Phymatoceratidae	
Geczyceras	clausum	Ait El Abbas	I	Shells	Hammatoceratidae	
Geczyceras	speciosum	Azag	I	Shells	Hammatoceratidae	
Grammatodon	sp.	Rich	II–III	Shells	Parallelodontidae	
Hammatoceras	H. aff. insigne	n’Zala (Jbel Aouja)	I	Shells	Hammatoceratidae	
Harpoceras	falciferum	Amellago	I	Shells	Hildoceratidae	Harpoceras reconstruction
Harpoceras	pseudoserpentinum	Amellago	I	Shells	Hildoceratidae	Harpoceras reconstruction
Harpoceras	serpentinum	Amellago	I	Shells	Hildoceratidae	Harpoceras reconstruction
Harpoceras	subplanatum	Amellago	I	Shells	Hildoceratidae	Harpoceras reconstruction
Harpoceras	cf.mediterraneum	Azag	I	Shells	Hildoceratidae	Harpoceras reconstruction
Hildaites	forte	Amellago	I	Shells	Hildoceratidae	
Hildaites	levisoni	Amellago	I	Shells	Hildoceratidae	
Hildaites	cf. serpentiniformis	Amellago	I	Shells	Hildoceratidae	
Hildaites	cf. subserpentinus	Amellago; Agounou	I	Shells	Hildoceratidae	
Hildaites	striatus	Amellago	I	Shells	Hildoceratidae	
Hildaites	wrighti	Amellago	I	Shells	Hildoceratidae	
Hildaites	(Martanites) cf. prorsiradiatus	Agounou	I	Shells	Hildoceratidae	
Hildaites	murleyi	Agounou	I	Shells	Hildoceratidae	
Hildaites	aff. murleyi	Ait El Abbes	I	Shells	Hildoceratidae	
Hildaites	cf. striatus	Agounou	I	Shells	Hildoceratidae	
Hildaites	undicosta	Agounou	I	Shells	Hildoceratidae	
Hildoceras	bifrons	Amellago; Azag; Talghemt Ridge	I	Shells	Hildoceratidae	Hildoceras sublevisoni
Hildoceras	lusitanicum	Amellago; Talghemt Ridge	I	Shells	Hildoceratidae	Hildoceras sublevisoni
Hildoceras	semipolitum	Amellago; Talghemt Ridge	I	Shells	Hildoceratidae	Hildoceras sublevisoni
Hildoceras	sublevisoni	Amellago; Azag; Talghemt Ridge	I	Shells	Hildoceratidae	Hildoceras sublevisoni
Hildoceras	bonarellii	Talghemt Ridge	I–II	Shells	Hildoceratidae	Hildoceras sublevisoni
Hildoceras	cf.tethysi	Azag	I	Shells	Hildoceratidae	Hildoceras sublevisoni
Hildoceras	appenninicus	Agounou; Azag	I	Shells	Hildoceratidae	Hildoceras sublevisoni
Hildoceras	snoussi	Ait El Abbes	I	Shells	Hildoceratidae	Hildoceras sublevisoni
Hildoceras	cf.apertum	Azag	I	Shells	Hildoceratidae	Hildoceras sublevisoni
Hildoceras	sp.	Amellago; Azag	I	Shells	Hildoceratidae	Hildoceras sublevisoni
Hyperlioceras	walkeri	Rich	III	Shells	Graphoceratidae	
Hyperlioceras	incisum	Rich	III	Shells	Graphoceratidae	
Hyperlioceras	inclusum	Rich	III	Shells	Graphoceratidae	
Hyperlioceras	mundum	Rich	III	Shells	Graphoceratidae	
Hyperlioceras	sp.	Rich	III	Shells	Graphoceratidae	
Leioceras	cf. comptum	n’Zala (Jbel Aouja)	II	Shells	Graphoceratidae	
Leioceras	costusum	n’Zala (Jbel Aouja)	II	Shells	Graphoceratidae	
Lithophaga	sp.	Boukendil area	IV	Shells, borings	Mytilidae	Lithophaga specimen
Ludwigia	aff. haugi	n’Zala (Jbel Aouja)	II	Shells	Graphoceratidae	
Lytoceras	siemensi	Amellago; n’Zala	I	Shells	Lytoceratidae	Lytoceras fimbriatum
Lytoceras	cf.siemensi	Agounou; Ait El Abbes	I-II	Shells	Lytoceratidae	Lytoceras fimbriatum
Lytoceras	subfimbriatum	n’Zala	II	Shells	Lytoceratidae	Lytoceras fimbriatum
Lytoceras	francisci	Ait El Abbes	I-II	Shells	Lytoceratidae	Lytoceras fimbriatum
Lytoceras	sp.	Amellago; Agounou; Ait El Abbes; n’Zala	I–II	Shells	Lytoceratidae	Lytoceras fimbriatum
Maconiceras	soloniacense	Amellago	I	Shells	Hammatoceratidae	
Malladaites	pertinax	Rich	III	Shells	Hammatoceratidae	
Merlaites	alticarinatus	Ait El Abbes; Azag	I	Shells	Hildoceratidae	
Merlaites	gradatus	Ait El Abbes	I	Shells	Hildoceratidae	
Neotelodactylites	eucosmus	Ait El Abbes	I	Shells	Dactylioceratidae	
Nerinea	sp.	Assameur n’Ait Fergane	IV	Shells	Nerineidae	
Nicaniella	sp.	Rich, Amellago	II–III	Shells	Astartidae	
Nodicoeloceras	cf. merlai	Ait El Abbes	I	Shells	Dactylioceratidae	
Osperleioceras	bicarinatum	Ait El Abbes; Azag	I	Shells	Hildoceratidae	
Osperleioceras	beauliziense	Azag	I	Shells	Hildoceratidae	
Osperleioceras	cf. authelini	Azag	I	Shells	Hildoceratidae	
Osperleioceras	cf. reynesi	Azag	I	Shells	Hildoceratidae	
Osperleioceras	O. (Pseudolioceras) sp.	Ait El Abbes	I	Shells	Hildoceratidae	
Osperleioceras	sp.	Azag	I	Shells	Hildoceratidae	
Palaeonucula	hammeri	Rich, Amellago	II–III	Shells	Nuculidae	
Palaeoneilo	sp.	Rich	III	Shells	Malletiidae	
Peronoceras	cf. subarmatum	Ait El Abbes	I	Shells	Dactylioceratidae	
Phylloceras	doderleinianum	Ait El Abbes	II	Shells	Phylloceratidae	Phylloceras reconstruction
Phylloceras	sp.	Amellago; n’Zala	I–II	Shells	Phylloceratidae	Phylloceras reconstruction
Phymatoceras	sp.	Azag	I	Shells	Phymatoceratidae	
Pholadomya	(Bucardiomya) bucardium	Jebel Assameur; Boukendil; Rich-Gourrama area	IV	Shells	Pholadomyidae	
Planammatoceras	sp.	n’Zala (Jbel Aouja)	II	Shells	Hammatoceratidae	
Platystrophites	cf. latus	Agounou	I	Shells	Dactylioceratidae	
Pleurotomaria	armata	Rich region	IV	Shells	Pleurotomariidae	
Pleydellia	aalensis	n’Zala (Jbel Aouja)	II	Shells	Graphoceratidae	
Plicatostylidae indet.?	Indeterminate	Assameur n’Ait Fergane	IV	Shell Accumulations	If true among the youngest know	Plicatostylidae
Polyplectus	pluricostatum	Amellago	I	Shells	Hammatoceratidae	
Polyplectus	sp.	Amellago	I	Shells	Hammatoceratidae	
Porpoceras	gr. vortex-verticosum	Amellago; Talghemt Ridge	I	Shells	Dactylioceratidae	
Porpoceras	cf. vortex	Ait El Abbes	I	Shells	Dactylioceratidae	
Porpoceras	cf. vorticellum	Ait El Abbes	I	Shells	Dactylioceratidae	
Porpoceras	cf. verticosum	Ait El Abbes	I	Shells	Dactylioceratidae	
Porpoceras	sp.	Ait El Abbes; Agounou	I	Shells	Dactylioceratidae	
Praestrigites	sp.	Rich	III	Shells	Strigoceratidae	
Praeoppelia	sp.	Rich	III	Shells	Oppeliidae	
Protetragonites	sp.	n’Zala	II	Shells	Lytoceratidae	
Protoecotraustes	sp.	Rich	III	Shells	Haploceratidae	
Pseudocrassiceras	aff.bayani	Ait El Abbes; Azag	I	Shells	Hildoceratidae	
Pseudocrassiceras	bayani	Ait El Abbes	I	Shells	Hildoceratidae	
Pseudocrassiceras	frantzi	Ait El Abbes	I	Shells	Hildoceratidae	
Pseudocrassiceras	praegruneri	Ait El Abbes	I	Shells	Hildoceratidae	
Pseudocrassiceras	cf. frantzi	Azag	I	Shells	Hildoceratidae	
Pseudocrassiceras	sp.	Azag	I	Shells	Hildoceratidae	
Pseudogrammoceras	praegruneri	Azag	I	Shells	Hildoceratidae	
Pseudogrammoceras	subregale	Ait El Abbes; Azag	I	Shells	Hildoceratidae	
Pseudogrammoceras	aff. fallaciosum	Azag	I	Shells	Hildoceratidae	
Rastellum	sp.	Assameur n’Ait Fergane, Boukendil	IV	Shells	Ostreidae	Rastellum fossil
Rhynchocerithium	sp.	Rich region	IV	Shells	Procerithiidae	
Riselloidea	sp.	Outarbat	III-IV	Shells	Eucyclidae	
Sadkia	richensis	Rich region	IV	Shells	Eucyclidae	
Saxicava	sp.	Boukendil area	IV	Shells, borings	Hiatellidae	
Sonninia	dominans	Rich	III	Shells	Sonniniidae	
Sonninia	modestum	Rich	III	Shells	Sonniniidae	
Sonninia	nannomorpha	Rich	III	Shells	Sonniniidae	
Tmetoceras	T. scissum	n’Zala (Jbel Aouja)	I–II	Shells	Hammatoceratidae	
Toxamblyites	densicostatus	Boukendil, Assameur	IV	Shells	Haploceratidae	
Trigonia	sp.	Rich	III	Shells	Trigoniidae	
Trilobiticeras	platygaster	Rich	III	Shells	Otoitidae	
Trilobiticeras	trilobitoides	Rich	III	Shells	Otoitidae	
Trilobiticeras	sp.	Rich	III	Shells	Otoitidae	
Tylostoma	globosum	Rich	III	Shells	Tylostomatidae	
Vacekia	sp.	n’Zala (Jbel Aouja)	I–II	Shells	Graphoceratidae	
Zugodactylites	sp.	Ait El Abbes	I	Shells	Dactylioceratidae	
Zurcheria	sp.	Rich	III	Shells	Hammatoceratidae	

=== Arthropods ===
Taxa	Species	Locality	Member	Material	Notes	Images
Bairdia	sp. A	Talghemt Ridge	I–II	Valves	Bairdiidae	
Bairdia	aff. hilda	Talghemt Ridge	IV	Valves	Bairdiidae	
Bairdiacypris	sp.	Assameur n’Aït Fergane; Bou Kendill; Jbel Tazigzaout; Ifrda n’Tizguienne; Assameur n’Baknou-Aferdoun’Achi; Talghemt Ridge	I–II	Valves	Bairdiacyprididae	
Cytherella	aff. concentrica	Talghemt Ridge	IV	Valves	Cytherellidae	
Cytherella	aff. fullonica	Talghemt Ridge	IV	Valves	Cytherellidae	
Cytherella	aff. toarcensis	Talghemt Ridge	I–II	Valves	Cytherellidae	
Cytherella	spp.	Assameur n’Aït Fergane; Bou Kendill; Jbel Tazigzaout; Ifrda n’Tizguienne; Assameur n’Baknou-Aferdoun’Achi; Talghemt Ridge	II	Valves	Cytherellidae	
Cytherelloidea	gr. catenulata	Talghemt Ridge	IV	Valves	Cytherelloididae	
Favreina	isp.	Assameur, Jebel Taferdout	III-IV	Coprolites	Decapod Coprolites (Axiidea?)	
Kinkelinella	K. sermoisensis	Talghemt Ridge	I–II	Valves	Kinkelinellidae	
Kinkelinella	gr. sermoisensis	Talghemt Ridge	I–II	Valves	Kinkelinellidae	
Micropneumatocythere	sp.	Assameur n’Aït Fergane; Bou Kendill; Jbel Tazigzaout; Ifrda n’Tizguienne; Assameur n’Baknou-Aferdoun’Achi; Talghemt Ridge	II	Valves	Podocopida	
Monoceratina	aff. ventrale	Talghemt Ridge	IV	Valves	Monoceratidae	
Paracypris	sp.	Talghemt Ridge	IV	Valves	Cytheridae	
Polycope	sp.	Talghemt Ridge	IV	Valves	Polycopidae	
Pontocyprella	sp.	Talghemt Ridge	I–II	Valves	Cyprididae	
Procytheridea	sp. B	Assameur n’Aït Fergane; Bou Kendill; Jbel Tazigzaout; Ifrda n’Tizguienne; Assameur n’Baknou-Aferdoun’Achi; Talghemt Ridge	II-IV	Valves	Cytherideidae	
Striatojonesia	S. striata	Talghemt Ridge	IV	Valves	Bythocytheridae	

=== Echinoderms ===
Genus	Species	Locality	Member	Material	Notes	Images
Cidaris	sp.	Jebel Assameur; Boukendil; Rich-Gourrama area	IV	Spines & Specimens	Cidaridae	Cidaris
Diplopodia	cf. morierii	Boukendil; Rich-Gourrama area; Assameur n’Aït Fergane; Jbel Tazigzaout; Ifrda n’Tizguienne; Assameur n’Baknou-Aferdoun’Achi	IV	Spines & Specimens	Diplopodiidae	
Gymnocidaris	pustulosa	Jebel Assameur; Boukendil; Rich-Gourrama area	IV	Spines & Specimens	Hemicidaridae	
Hemicidaris	koechlini	Boukendil; Rich-Gourrama area; Assameur n’Aït Fergane; Jbel Tazigzaout; Ifrda n’Tizguienne; Assameur n’Baknou-Aferdoun’Achi	IV	Spines & Specimens	Hemicidaridae	Hemicidaris
Ophiuroids indet.	Indeterminate	Boukendil area	IV	Complete specimens		
Psephechinus	globosus	Boukendil; Rich-Gourrama area; Assameur n’Aït Fergane; Jbel Tazigzaout; Ifrda n’Tizguienne; Assameur n’Baknou-Aferdoun’Achi	IV	Spines & Specimens	Stomechinidae	

=== Annelida ===
Genus	Species	Locality	Member	Material	Notes	Images
Nogrobs	moroccensis	Boukendil, Assameur	IV	Quadrangular tubes	Serpulidae	
Serpula	socialis	Assameur n’Ait Fergane, Boukendil; Imilchil; Jebel Bou Kendill (cap bed)	I-III–IV	Tubes / colonies	Serpulidae	Serpula vermicularis
Serpula	sp.	Assameur n’Ait Fergane, Boukendil; Jebel Bou Kendill (cap bed)	III–IV	Tubes / colonies	Serpulidae	Serpula vermicularis
Terebella	lapilloides	Assameur n’Ait Fergane, Boukendil; Jebel Bou Kendill (cap bed)	III–IV	Tubes / colonies	Terebellidae	Terebella

=== Chondrichthyes ===
Taxa	Species	Locality	Member	Material	Notes	Images
Strophodus	atlasensis	Talsint (eastern High Atlas)	III–IV	Articulated dentition (holotype PIMUZ A/I 5181)	Acrodontidae	Strophodus atlasensis

=== Dinoflajellates ===
Taxa	Species	Locality	Member	Material	Notes	Images
Kallosphaeridium	sp.	Amellago	I-II	Cysts	Incertade Sedis	
Luehndea	cirilliae	Amellago	I	Cysts	Luehndeoideae	
Luehndea	spinosa	Amellago	I	Cysts	Luehndeoideae	
Mancodinium	semitabulatum	Amellago	I-III	Cysts	Mancodinioideae	
Mendicodinium	microscabratum	Amellago	I-II	Cysts	Gonyaulacales	
Mendicodinium	sp. 1	Amellago	I-II	Cysts	Gonyaulacales	
Moesiodinium	sp.	Amellago	I-II	Cysts	Heterocapsaceae	
Phallocysta	sp.	Amellago	I-II	Cysts	Peridiniphycideae	
Wallodinium	cf. cylindricum	Amellago	I-II	Cysts	Incertade Sedis	

=== Algae ===
Taxa	Species	Locality	Member	Material	Notes	Images
Biscutum	depravatum	Amellago; Talghemt Ridge	II–III	Coccoliths	Biscutaceae	
Biscutum	grande	Amellago; Talghemt Ridge	II–III	Coccoliths	Biscutaceae	
Botryococcus	sp.	Amellago	I-III	Miospore	Botryococcaceae	
Cayeuxia	sp.	Assameur n’Ait Fergane; Assoul ramp	IV	Filamentous thalli	Cyanobacteria	
Carinolithus	superbus	Amellago; Talghemt Ridge	II–III	Coccoliths	Carinolithaceae	
Cylindroporella	arabica	Assameur n’Ait Fergane	IV	Thalli	Dasycladaceae	
Discorhabdus	ignotus	Amellago; Talghemt Ridge	II–III	Coccoliths	Discorhabdaceae	
Discorhabdus	striatus	Amellago; Talghemt Ridge	II–III	Coccoliths	Discorhabdaceae	
Garwoodia	sp.	Amellago canyon	IV	Filamentous thalli	Cyanobacteria	
Girvanella	sp.	Assameur n’Ait Fergane	IV	Filamentous thalli	Cyanobacteria	
Halimeda	sp. (cf.)	Assameur n’Ait Fergane	IV	Thallus fragments	Halimedaceae	Halimeda
Lotharingius	hauffii	Amellago; Talghemt Ridge	II–III	Coccoliths	Lotharingiaceae	
Mitrolithus	jansae	Amellago; Talghemt Ridge	II–III	Coccoliths	Mitrolithaceae	
Permocalculus	sp.	Assameur n’Ait Fergane, Boukendil	IV	Encrusting thalli	Gymnocodiaceae	
Rivularia	sp.	Amellago canyon	IV	Filamentous thalli	Rivulariaceae	
Sarfatiella	dubari	Assameur n’Ait Fergane	IV	Thalli	Dasycladaceae	
Schizosphaerella	sp.	Amellago; Talghemt Ridge	II–III	Coccoliths	Schizosphaerellaceae	
Sellinoporella	sp.	Assameur n’Ait Fergane	IV	Thalli	Dasycladaceae	
Similiscutum	finchii	Amellago; Talghemt Ridge	II–III	Coccoliths	Biscutaceae	
Similiscutum	novum	Amellago; Talghemt Ridge	II–III	Coccoliths	Biscutaceae	
Solenopora	sp. (cf.)	Assameur n’Ait Fergane	IV	Encrusting thalli	Solenoporaceae	
Tasmanites	sp.	Amellago	I-III	Miospore	Tasmanaceae	
Triscutum	sullivanii	Amellago; Talghemt Ridge	II–III	Coccoliths	Biscutaceae	
Watznaueria	colacicchii	Amellago; Talghemt Ridge	III	Coccoliths	Watznaueriaceae	
Watznaueria	fossacincta	Amellago; Talghemt Ridge	III	Coccoliths	Watznaueriaceae	

=== Plants ===
Taxa	Species	Locality	Member	Material	Notes	Images
Alisporites	spp.	Amellago	I	Pollen	Corystospermaceae	
Callialasporites	spp.	Amellago	I-II	Pollen	Araucariaceae	Araucaria.
Classopollis	sp.	Amellago	I	Pollen	Hirmeriellaceae	
Cyathidites	spp.	Amellago	I	Spores	Cyatheaceae	Cyathea.
Deltoidospora	spp.	Amellago	I	Spores	Pteridophyte	
Kraeuselisporites	reissingeri	Amellago	I	Spores	Lycopodiaceae	Selaginella.
Ischyosporites	variegatus	Amellago	I	Spores	Lycopodiaceae	Anemia.
Neoraistrickia	spp.	Amellago	I-II	Spores	Selaginellaceae	
Quadraeculina	spp.	Amellago	I	Pollen	Podocarpaceae	Dacrycarpus.
Zonalapollenites	spp.	Amellago	I-II	Pollen	Araucariaceae	

== See also ==
- Toarcian turnover
- Toarcian formations
  - Tafraout Formation, SISTER UNIT, Morocco
  - Tagoudite Formation, SISTER UNIT, Morocco
  - Azilal Formation, SISTER UNIT, Morocco
  - Aganane Formation, Morocco
  - Calcaires du Bou Dahar, Morocco
  - Marne di Monte Serrone, Italy
  - Podpeč Limestone, Slovenia
  - El Pedregal Formation, Spain
  - Mizur Formation, North Caucasus
  - Sachrang Formation, Austria
  - Posidonia Shale, Lagerstätte in Germany
  - Irlbach Sandstone, Germany
  - Ciechocinek Formation, Germany and Poland
  - Krempachy Marl Formation, Poland and Slovakia
  - Djupadal Formation, Central Skane
  - Lava Formation, Lithuania
  - Whitby Mudstone, England
  - Fernie Formation, Alberta and British Columbia
    - Poker Chip Shale
  - Whiteaves Formation, British Columbia
  - Navajo Sandstone, Utah
  - Los Molles Formation, Argentina
  - Mawson Formation, Antarctica
  - Kandreho Formation, Madagascar
  - Kota Formation, India
  - Cattamarra Coal Measures, Australia
