= Tagoudite Formation =

Geological formations in Morocco

- Stratigraphic range: Early-Middle Toarcian 184–180 Ma
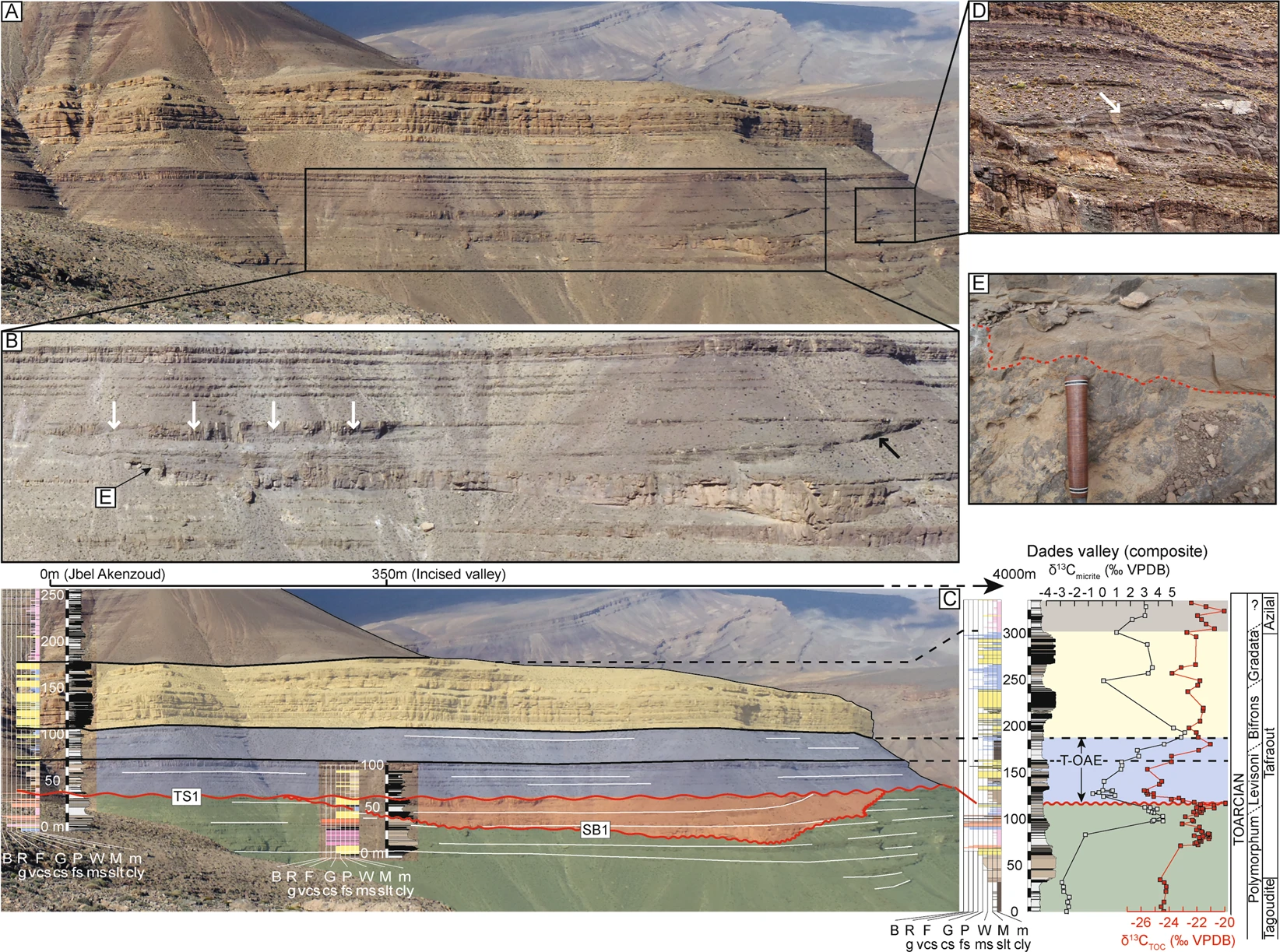
- Profile at Jebel Akenzoud (Dadès Gorges) where the Tagoudite, Tafraout and Azilal Fms can be seen. (B) Close-up view of the left side ooidal shoal with lateral accretions (white arrows). (C) Stratigraphic correlation. (D) Close up of the right side shoulder. (E) Close up on the erosion surface.
- Type: Geological Formation
- Underlies: Aït Abdi Formation; Aït Hani formation; Agoudim Formation; Amellago Formation; Bin el Ouidane Formation; Tafraout Formation
- Overlies: Aberdouz Formation; Aganane Formation; Choucht Formation; Ouchbis Formation
- Thickness: 230 m (750 ft)

Lithology
- Primary: Siliclastic Sandstone/Mudstone, Marlstone

Location
- Location: Er-Rich
- Coordinates: 31.49°N 5.58°W
- Approximate paleocoordinates: 26.6°N 3.4°W
- Region: High Atlas and Middle Atlas
- Country: Morocco

Type section
- Named for: Tagoudite Pass near Er-Rich
- Named by: Riccardo Bernasconi
- Year defined: 1983
- Region: Er-Rich, Midelt Province
- Thickness at type section: ~70 m (230 ft)
- Tagoudite Formation (Morocco)

The Tagoudite Formation (also known as the "Upper Tamadout Formation") is a geological formation of Toarcian (Lower Jurassic) age in the Béni-Mellal, Imilchil, Tinerhir, Tinejdad and Errachidia areas of the High Atlas (reaching areas near Rich in the Middle Atlas) of Morocco.

== Description ==
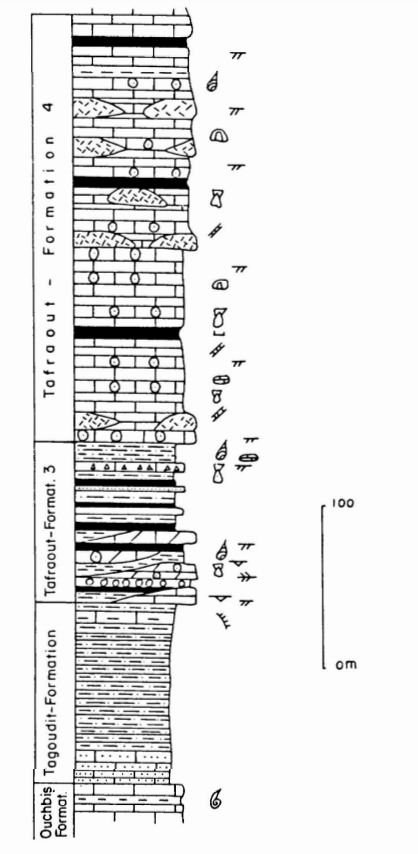
Profile at Ouguerd Zegzaoune with the Tagoudite and Tafraout Fms

The Tagoudite Formation marks a major shift in Liassic sedimentation, replacing the carbonate turbidites of the Ouchbis Formation with mostly siliciclastic layers. These layers alternate between gray and green sandstone, sandy marls, and siltstones, forming sequences up to 20 meters thick. They show a decrease in grain size and an increase in marl content from bottom to top, with features like ripple marks and laminations. Microscopically, the turbidites are mainly fine silt, with varying amounts of quartz, feldspar, and carbonate detritus, and occasional pyrite. This formation suggests an open marine environment with sediment interruptions and materials coming from distant areas. It is widespread in the Central High Atlas, with thicknesses reaching up to 320 meters, and varies across different regions like Tounfite and Beni Mellal. In the Central Middle Atlas, sedimentation was interrupted by emersion before the formation's deposition. The deposits of the Tagoudite Formation are mostly restricted to the central High Atlas, with a thickness of approx. 200 m in the northwest vs at 30–70 m in the southeast, but retaining around 200 m at center areas like Foum Tillicht. More at the E it starts to disappear like at the Cirque de Jaafar, SW of Midelt or more at the E at Bou Redine Gorges, were the Agoudim Formation directly overlies the Pliensbachian.

Small (-1 cm) rounded ridges and troughs wrinkle structures occur on the tops of fine-grained turbidite beds deposited rapidly in deep, low-light conditions, too deep for photosynthetic mats. The wrinkles were likely formed by chemosynthetic microbial mats, sulfur-oxidizing bacteria (Beggiatoaceae, Thioploca spp., and similar Gammaproteobacteria) that thrive in dark, organic-rich sediments where chemical gradients provide energy. Frequent turbidity currents, high organic content (including woody debris), and sulfide-rich pore waters created ideal conditions for these mats to grow and for their textures to be preserved. Low animal activity due to toxic sulfide levels further enhanced preservation.

== Biota ==
Phytoplankton marks oscillations of negative carbon isotope excursions at T-OAE and Pliensbachian-Toarcian (Pl-To) transition, dominated by open marine haptophytan or incertade sedis coccoliths like Biscutum, Carinolithus (including the index C. superbus, marker of the Polymorphum biozone), Calcivascularis, Calyculus, Lotharingius, Mitrolithus, Parhabdolithus or Schizosphaerella, measured in the Tagoudite Fm in areas like Amellago or Talghemt. Dinoflagellates are rare and limited to taxa such as Luehndea, Mancodinium and Mendicodinium.

Color key: Taxon / Reclassified taxon / Taxon falsely reported as present / Dubious taxon or junior synonym / Ichnotaxon / Ootaxon / Morphotaxon

Notes
Uncertain or tentative taxa are in small text
~~crossed out~~ taxa are discredited.

=== Foraminifera ===
Genus	Species	Location	Material	Notes	Images
Dentalina	D. terquemi; D. sp.	Bou-Oumardoul	Tests/shells	A foraminifer of the family Nodosariinae.	
Citharina	C. sp.	Taquat N'Agrd	Tests/shells	A foraminifer of the family Vaginulininae.	
Everticyclammina	E. sp.	Aguerd N´Igli; Aguerd N´Wahmane; Col de Ghnim; Ouguerd Zegzaoune; Tizi n-M´Barek	Tests/shells	A foraminifer of the Everticyclamminidae family.	
Ichtyolaria	I. carinata; I. gr.major	Bou-Oumardoul; Talghemt	Tests/shells	A foraminifer of the family Ichthyolariinae.	
Lenticulina	L. matutina; L. gottingensis; L. acutiangulata; L. münsteri; L. toarcense; L. chichery; L. sp.	Anergui; Bou-Oumardoul; Taquat N'Agrd; Talghemt	Tests/shells	A foraminifer of the family Lenticulininae.	
Lingulina	L. brizaeformis; L. pupa; L. dentaliformis; L. tenera	Bou-Oumardoul; Taquat N'Agrd	Tests/shells	A foraminifer of the family Lenticulininae.	
Marginulina	M. prima; M. spinata	Taquat N'Agrd	Tests/shells	A foraminifer of the family Marginulininae.	
Ophtalmidium	O. concentricum; O. sp.	Aguerd N´Igli; Anergui; Bou-Oumardoul; Ilourhmane; Jebel Toksine; Ouguerd Zegzaoune; Taquat N'Agrd; Timghissine	Tests/shells	A foraminifer of the family Ophthalmidiidae.	
Orbitopsella	O. praecursor	Col de Ghnim	Tests/shells	A foraminifer of the family Orbitopsellinae.	
Pseudocyclammina	P. sp.	Aguerd N´Igli; Bou-Oumardoul	Tests/shells	A foraminifer of the family Hauraniidae.	
Pseudonodosaria	P. tennis; P. multicostata; P. gr.pygmea; P. sp.	Bou-Oumardoul; Ilourhmane; Ouguerd Zegzaoune; Talghemt; Taquat N'Agrd	Tests/shells	A foraminifer of the family Nodosariinae.	
Reinholdella	R. sp.	Anergui; Bou-Oumardoul	Tests/shells	A foraminifer of the family Ceratobuliminidae.	
Verneuilinoides	V. cf.subvitreus	Talghemt	Tests/shells	A foraminifer of the family Verneuilinoidinae	

=== Ichnofossils ===
Ichnogenus	Ichnospecies	Location	Made by	Images
Arenicolites	A. ispp.	Bou-Oumardoul; Ilourhmane; Jbel Taguendouft; Jebel Toksine; Ouguerd Zegzaoune; Tamadoute; Taquat N'Agrd; Tougza	Amphipoda; Arenicolidae; Capitellidae; Sipuncula; Spionida	Arenicolites specimens from Mongolia
Asteriacites	A. ispp.	Bou-Oumardoul	Starfish; Ophiurida	Asteriacites specimen
Chondrites	C. ispp.	Agrd N´Igli; Bou-Oumardoul; Ilourhmane; Jebel Toksine; Ouguerd Zegzaoune	Polychaeta; Sipuncula	Chondrites trace fossil from Scotland
Diplocraterion	D. ispp.	Bou-Oumardoul	Echiurans; Enteropneustans; Polychaeta; Sipunculans	Diplocraterion diagram
Paleodictyon	P. ispp.	Bou-Oumardoul	Bacteria; Hexactinellid	
Phymatoderma	P. granulata	Bou-Oumardoul	Holothurians; Spatangoids; Spionids	
Rhizocorallium	R. parallelum; R. ispp.	Agrd N´Igli; Aït Allal; Jbel Akenzoud; Jbel Taguendouft; Jebel Toksine; NW Dades Valley; Todrha-Dades; Wahmane	Actinopterygii; Decapoda; Polychaeta	Rhizocorallium from Australia
Scolicia	S. ispp.	Bou-Oumardoul; Ilourhmane; Ouguerd Zegzaoune	Echinoids; Gastropoda	
Skolithos	S. ispp.	Jbel Taguendouft; Jebel Toksine	Decapoda; Phoronidans; Polychaeta	Representation of Skolithos along the possible makers
Thalassinoides	T. ispp.	Bou-Oumardoul; Ilourhmane; Jebel Toksine; Ouguerd Zegzaoune	Actinopteri; Anomura; Decapoda; Dipnoi; Polychaeta; Sipuncula	Thalassinoides from France
Zoophycos	Z. ispp.	Agrd N´Igli; Aït Allal; Bou-Oumardoul; Ilourhmane; Jebel Toksine; Ouguerd Zegzaoune; Wahmane	Arenicolidae; Capitellidae; Sipuncula; Spionida	Zoophycos fossil from Kentucky

=== Brachiopoda ===
Genus	Species	Location	Material	Notes	Images
Quadratirhynchia	Q. vasconcellosi	Akka n'Igoulzane; Jebel Bou Ifliyou; Jebel Ich Taskouine	Shells	A brachiopod of the family Tetrarhynchiidae	
Homoeorhynchia	H. meridionalis; H. batalleri	Akka n'Igoulzane; Jebel Bou Ifliyou; Jebel Ich Taskouine; Oued Mijdider	Shells	A brachiopod of the family Rhynchonellinae.	
Pseudogibbirhynchia	P. jurensis	Jebel Ich Taskouine	Shells	A brachiopod of the family Pamirorhynchiinae	
Soaresirhynchia	S. tamazirta; S. bouchardi	Jebel Ich Taskouine	Shells	A brachiopod of the family Basiliolinae	
Telothyris	T. jauberti; T. arnaudi	Akka n'Igoulzane; Jebel Bou Ifliyou; Jebel Ich Taskouine	Shells	A brachiopod of the family Lobothyrididae.	

=== Mollusks ===
Genus	Species	Location	Material	Notes	Images
Alectryonia	A. (Lopha) amellagensis	Agoudim; Amellago	Shells	A marine member of the family Ostreidae.	Modern Lopha specimen
Calliphylloceras	C. nilssoni	Amellago	Shells	An ammonite of the family Calliphylloceratinae	
Canavaria	C. aff. zancleana; C. cf. rosenbergi	Amellago	Shells	An ammonite of the family Hildoceratidae.	
Chlamys	C. semiarticulatus; C. aff.uhligi	Agoudim; Amellago; Bou Dahar	Shells	A marine member of the family Pectinidae.	Modern Chlamys specimens
Dactylioceras	D. (Orthodactylites) aff. crosbeyi; D. cf.helianihoides; D. (Eodactylites) mirabile; D. (Eodactylites) simplex; D. (Eodactylites) cf.polymorphum; D. (Eodactylites) pseudocommune; D. pseudocrassulosum; D. cf. tauromenense; D. (Orthodactylites) andaluciensis	Agoudim; Agounou; Almou-n' Tarzekt; Amellago; Jbel Aouloum; Jbel Bou Hamid; Jbel Taguendouft; SE Cherket; Tagounit; Talghemt; Tamadoute; Taquat N'Agrd; Tougza	Shells	An ammonite of the family Dactylioceratidae.	Dactylioceras reconstruction
Eleganticeras	E. exaratum; E. sp.	Amellago; Foum Tillicht	Shells	An ammonite of the family Hildoceratidae.	
Gryphaea	G. sportella; G. cristata; G. (Bilobissa) sp.	Agoudim; Ait Athmane; Amellago	Shells	A saltwater/brackish bivalve of the family Gryphaeidae.	Specimen of the genus
Harpax	H. spp.	Agoudim; Aït-Haceïne; Amellago	Shells	A marine member of the family Plicatulidae.	
Harpoceras	H. serpentinum; H. pseudoserpentinum; H. falciferum; H. subplanatum	Amellago	Shells	An ammonite of the family Hildoceratidae.	Harpoceras reconstruction
Hildaites	H. striatus; H. wrighti; H. cf. striatus	Agounou; Amellago	Shells	An ammonite of the family Hildoceratidae.	
Hildoceras	H. sublevisoni; H. lusitanicum; H. bifrons; H. spp.	Agrd N´Igli; Aït Allal; Akka n'Igoulzane; Foum Tillicht; Ouguerd Zegzaoune; Taquat N'Agrd; Wahmane	Shells	An ammonite of the family Hildoceratidae.	H. sublevisoni
Juraphyllites	J. libertus	Talghemt	Shells	An ammonite of the family Hildoceratidae.	
Lytoceras	L. monpianense; L. paulosiomaiicum; L. ex gr. villae	Agoudim; Amellago	Shells	An ammonite of the family Lytoceratidae.	
Murleyiceras	M. sp.	Almou-n' Tarzekt	Shells	An ammonite of the family Hildoceratidae.	
Neithea	N. ayarii	Agoudim; Amellago	Shells	A marine member of Neitheidae.	
Neolioceratoides	N. hoffmanni	Amellago; Talghemt	Shells	An ammonite of the family Hildoceratidae.	
Paltarpites	P. paltum; P. (Paltarpites) madagascariense; P. cf.palius; P. sp.	Ait el Abbas; Jbel Aouloum; Talghemt	Shells	An ammonite of the family Hildoceratidae.	
Platyacra	P. (Asperilla) russoi	Amellago	Shells	A trochoidean, member of the family Angariidae	
Praepolyplectus	P. sp.	Amellago	Shells	An ammonite of the family Hildoceratidae.	
Purpurina	P. rudis	Amellago	Shells	A caenogastropodan, member of the family Purpurinidae	Purpurina specimen
Pholadomya	P. bucardium; P. fidicula; P. spp.	Agrd N´Igli; Amellago	Shells	A marine member of the family Pholadomyidae.	
Spondylus	S. numidus	Aghbalou N'Kerdous	Shells	A marine member of the family Spondylidae.	Modern Spondylus specimens
Trichites	T. spp.	Agrd N´Igli; Amellago	Shells	A marine member of the family Pinnidae.	

=== Arthropoda ===
Genus	Species	Location	Material	Notes	Images
Bairdia	B. aff.carinata; B. spp.	Talghemt	Shells	A marine ostracod of the family Bairdiinae.	
Bairdiacypris	B. spp.	Talghemt	Shells	A marine ostracod of the family Bairdiinae.	
Kinkelinella	K. sermoisensis; K. sp.	Talghemt	Shells	A marine ostracod of the family Protocytheridae. Local dominant Lower Toarcian taxon	
Ogmoconcha	O. sp.	Talghemt	Shells	A marine ostracod of the family Healdiidae.	
Polycope	P. spp.	Bou-Oumardoul	Shells	A marine ostracod of the family Polycopidae.	

=== Echinodermata ===
Rare Ophiuroid impressions can be observed.

Genus	Species	Location	Material	Notes	Images
Apiocrinites	A. amalthei	Agoudim; Amellago	Columnar ossicles	A crinoid of the family Apiocrinitidae	
Cotylederma	C. spp.	Agoudim; Amellago	Columnar ossicles	A crinoid of the family Cotyledermatidae	
Diplechinus	D. despujolsi; D. spp.	Agoudim; Amellago	Ambulacrum, spines	An echinoid of the family Stomechinidae	
Diplocidaris	D. menchikofli	Agoudim; Amellago	Ambulacrum, spines	An echinoid of the family Diplocidaridae	
Dubarechinus	D. despujolsi	Agoudim; Amellago	Ambulacrum, spines	An echinoid of the family Orthopsidae	
Firmacidaris	F. precincta	Agoudim; Amellago	Ambulacrum, spines	An echinoid of the family Cidaridae	
Hemicidaris	H. (Dorycidaris) termieri	Agoudim; Amellago	Ambulacrum, spines	An echinoid of the family Hemicidaridae	
Pentacrinites	P. spp.	Agoudim; Amellago	Columnar ossicles	A crinoid of the family Pentacrinitidae	Reconstruction of a few specimens
Polypedina	P. tounatensis	Agoudim; Amellago	Ambulacrum, spines	An echinoid of the family Pedinidae	

=== Actinopteri ===
Genus	Species	Location	Material	Notes	Images
Leptolepis	L. spp.	Jbel Bou Hamid	Semiarticulated specimens	Marine bony fish of the family Leptolepidae.	Restoration of L. coryphaenoides

=== Viridiplantae ===
Phytoclasts, spores, pollen and Tasmanites & Botryococcus algae indicate that the palaeoenvironment of the lower Toarcian Amellago area was likely proximal continental shelf with a high terrestrial input, and notorious influence of brackish water in the depositional environment. This interval is numerically dominated by Classopollis, which usually accounts for more than 60.95% of the palynomorphs present.

Genus	Species	Location	Material	Notes	Images
Alisporites	A. spp.	Amellago	Pollen	Affinities with Peltaspermaceae or Corystospermaceae	
Callialasporites	C. trilobatus; C. spp.	Amellago	Pollen	Affinities with Araucariaceae.	Callialasporites was probably related to modern plants such as Araucaria.
Classopollis	C. spp.	Amellago	Pollen	Affinities with Cheirolepidiaceae.	
Cyathidites	C. minor	Amellago	Spores	Affinities with Cyatheaceae.	Cyathidites was probably related to modern plants such as Cyathea.
Kraeuselisporites	K. reissingeri	Amellago	Spores	Affinities with Selaginellaceae.	Kraeuselisporites was probably related to modern plants such as Selaginella.
Ischyosporites	I. variegatus	Amellago	Spores	Affinities with Schizaeaceae/Anemiaceae.	Ischyosporites was probably related to modern plants such as Anemia.
Quadraeculina	Q. anaellaeformis	Amellago	Pollen	Affinities with Podocarpaceae or Pinaceae.	Quadraeculina was probably related to modern plants such as Dacrycarpus.

== See also ==
- Toarcian turnover
- Toarcian formations
  - Tafraout Formation, SISTER UNIT, Morocco
  - Azilal Formation, SISTER UNIT, Morocco
  - Aganane Formation, Morocco
  - Calcaires du Bou Dahar, Morocco
  - Marne di Monte Serrone, Italy
  - Podpeč Limestone, Slovenia
  - El Pedregal Formation, Spain
  - Mizur Formation, North Caucasus
  - Sachrang Formation, Austria
  - Posidonia Shale, Lagerstätte in Germany
  - Irlbach Sandstone, Germany
  - Ciechocinek Formation, Germany and Poland
  - Krempachy Marl Formation, Poland and Slovakia
  - Djupadal Formation, Central Skane
  - Lava Formation, Lithuania
  - Whitby Mudstone, England
  - Fernie Formation, Alberta and British Columbia
    - Poker Chip Shale
  - Whiteaves Formation, British Columbia
  - Navajo Sandstone, Utah
  - Los Molles Formation, Argentina
  - Mawson Formation, Antarctica
  - Kandreho Formation, Madagascar
  - Kota Formation, India
  - Cattamarra Coal Measures, Australia
