= Abbasites =

Abbasites Temporal range: Aalenian

Scientific classification
- Kingdom: Animalia
- Phylum: Mollusca
- Class: Cephalopoda
- Subclass: †Ammonoidea
- Order: †Ammonitida
- Family: †Erycitidae
- Subfamily: †Erycitinae
- Genus: †Abbasites; Buckman, 1921

Species
- see text

Extinct genus of ammonites

Abbasites is an extinct genus of ammonites from the early Middle Jurassic epoch, included in the ammonitid family Erycitidae.

== Description ==
Abbasites is small and subglobular with ribbing that divides high on its sides and which has an interruption on the venter that replaces the keel, generally characteristic of the Hammatoceratidae

== Classification ==
Abbasites was originally described by Sydney S. Buckman in 1921, with A. abbas as its type species, and was considered by some to be a subgenus of Erycites. Abbasites was included in the Otoitidae, the ancestral family of the Stephanoceratoidea, according to Westermann (1965) and Imlay (1984) but was previously placed in the Hildoceratoid family Hammatoceratidae by Arkell et al. (1957). It is currently regarded as a full genus in the Erycitidae subfamily Erycitinae. The genus Erycites is believed to be ancestral to Abbasites. However, Abbasites is believed to have left its own descendants in the ammonite family Otoitidae.

Valid species:

- Abbasites abbas, found in southern Spain.
- A. platystomus, found in southern Alaska.
- A. sparsicostatus (described by Ralph Imlay)

Dubious and excluded species:

- ?Abbasites cestiferus; type specimen too small to be certain about classification.
- (Abbasites) challinori; originally thought to be closely related to A. abbas, but following subsequent study has been removed from Abbasites to the genus Opuatia
