= Erycitidae =

Erycitidae Temporal range: Early - Middle Jurassic

Scientific classification
- Kingdom: Animalia
- Phylum: Mollusca
- Class: Cephalopoda
- Subclass: †Ammonoidea
- Order: †Ammonitida
- Superfamily: †Hildoceratoidea
- Family: †Erycitidae; Spath, 1928

Genera
- Praerycites Venturi, 1981; Cagliceras Rulleau & Elmi, 2001; Erycites Gemmellaro, 1886; Abbasites Buckman, 1921; Abbasitoides Géczy, 1966; Haplopleuroceras Buckman, 1892; Malladaites Linares & Sandoval, 1986; Spinammatoceras Schindewolf, 1964

Extinct family of ammonites

Erycitidae is a family of Lower and Middle Jurassic ammonites included in the Hildoceratoidea. The hammatoceratid subfamily Erycitinae is equivalent. Genera include Erycites (type) and Abbasites.

== Description ==
Erycitids are generally evolute with all whorls showing and are strongly ribbed with ribs branching on the outer part of the flanks and crossing over the outer rim, or venter.

== Classification ==
In older taxonomies, e.g. W.J. Arkell et al., 1964 and D.T. Donovan et al., 1981, the Hammatoceratidae, which then included erycitid genera, was part of the Hammatoceratoidea. More recently the Erycitidae was reassigned to the Hammatoceratoidea which also includes the Hammatoceratidae, Graphoceratidae and Sonniniidae removed from the Hildoceratoidea, left with only the Hildoceratidae and its included subfamilies.
