= Euaptetoceras =

Euaptetoceras Temporal range: Bajocian

Scientific classification
- Domain: Eukaryota
- Kingdom: Animalia
- Phylum: Mollusca
- Class: Cephalopoda
- Subclass: †Ammonoidea
- Order: †Ammonitida
- Family: †Hammatoceratidae
- Subfamily: †Hammatoceratinae
- Genus: †Euaptetoceras; Buckman, 1922

Species
- Euaptetoceras amplectens (Buckman, 1889)

Genus of molluscs (fossil)

Euaptetoceras is an evolute hildoceratoid ammonite from the lower Middle Jurassic, included in the family Hammatoceratidae and the subfamility Hammatoceratinae. The genus may be a junior synonym for Eudmetoceras of Buckman, 1920.

The shell of Euaptetoceras has an evolute, compressed, discoidal shape with a whorl section higher than wide. The inner whorls have long primary ribs while the outer whorls become smooth. The venter, which is the outer rim, is narrowly to sharply rounded and its suture is rather complex. Euaptetoceras is found in strata of Europe, Iran, and Argentina.
