= Guhsania =

Guhsania Temporal range: Bajocian

Scientific classification
- Kingdom: Animalia
- Phylum: Mollusca
- Class: Cephalopoda
- Subclass: †Ammonoidea
- Order: †Ammonitida
- Family: †Sonniniidae
- Subfamily: †Witchelliinae
- Genus: †Guhsania; McLearn, 1926

Genus of molluscs (fossil)

Guhsania is an extinct ammonoid cephalopod genus that lived during the early Middle Jurassic (early Bajocian), from about 171.5 to 173.5 Ma.

Guhsania belongs to the Sonniniidae, a member of the Hildoceratoidea superfamily. The shell (conch): essentially involute and ribbed throughout, umbilical edge sharp, outer whorl oxyconic.
