= Fissilobiceras =

Fissilobiceras Temporal range: Bajocian

Scientific classification
- Kingdom: Animalia
- Phylum: Mollusca
- Class: Cephalopoda
- Subclass: †Ammonoidea
- Order: †Ammonitida
- Family: †Hammatoceratidae
- Subfamily: †Hammatoceratinae
- Genus: †Fissilobiceras; Buckman, 1919

Genus of molluscs (fossil)

Fissilobiceras ist ein glatter, komprimierter, involuter Ammonit aus dem unteren mittleren Jura (Aalenium/Bajocium) Europas, der 1919 von Buckman benannt wurde. Fissilobiceras gehört zur Familie der Hildoceratoiden (Hammatoceratidae).

Fissilobiceras is similar to Shirbuirnia, except primarily for being more involute and having complex sutures. More of the inner whorls show in Shirbuirnia and its sutures are simple. Fissilobiceras also has a low keel running along the venter and only a small part of the inner whorls are exposed in the small umbilicus.
