= Bredyia =

Bredyia Temporal range: Middle Jurassic

Scientific classification
- Kingdom: Animalia
- Phylum: Mollusca
- Class: Cephalopoda
- Subclass: †Ammonoidea
- Order: †Ammonitida
- Family: †Hammatoceratidae
- Subfamily: †Hammatoceratinae
- Genus: †Bredyia; Buckman, 1910

Type species
- Bredyia crassornata (Buckman, 1910)

Species
- Bredyia crassornata (Buckman, 1910); Bredyia alleoni (Dumortier, 1874); Bredyia lagardettei Rulleau, 2006

Synonyms
- Burtonia Buckman, 1910

Genus of molluscs (fossil)

Bredyia is a genus of ammonites from the lower part of the Middle Jurassic, found in Europe and North America.

Bredyia is a member of the Hammatoceratidae, a family which comprises part of the Hildoceratoidea. Its shell is involute, strongly ribbed, with a small umbilicus. Whorls are strongly embracing; ribs thick, radially straight on the sides, curves forward on the venter but do not meet. The sides or flanks are outwardly bowed. The venter has a narrow keel and may be fastigate, like a gable roof.
