= Dorsetensia =

Dorsetensia Temporal range: Bajocian

Scientific classification
- Kingdom: Animalia
- Phylum: Mollusca
- Class: Cephalopoda
- Subclass: †Ammonoidea
- Order: †Ammonitida
- Family: †Sonniniidae
- Subfamily: †Sonniniinae
- Genus: †Dorsetensia; Buckman, 1892

Species
- See text

Genus of molluscs (fossil)

Dorsetensia is a narrowly coiled discoidal ammonite from the early Middle Jurassic, lower Bajocian, belonging to the family Sonniniidae of the superfamily Hildoceratoidea. The inner whorls are ribbed or smooth, outer whorl is smooth. The outer rim (venter) is narrow, with a keel running along the middle. The umbilicus, the opening in the middle of the shell exposing inner whorls, is of moderate size with a sharp, sometimes undercut edge.

Dorsetensia is similar in general form to the genus Witchellia, to the point that it had been regarded as a subgenus of the latter or as subgenera of Soninnia along with Witchellia. The prevailing consensus is these are three distinct genera with Dorsetensia and Witchellia distinguished by shell morphology and stratigraphic disjunction. Witchellia is from the middle Lower Bajocian Laeviuscula subzone, Sowebvyi Zone and has a distinct tabulate venter even in smooth involute forms. Dorsetensia is from the middle Bajocian Humphriesianum Zone and has a narrow fastigate (pitched roof) venter.
