= Frechiella =

Frechiella Temporal range: Toarcian

Scientific classification
- Kingdom: Animalia
- Phylum: Mollusca
- Class: Cephalopoda
- Subclass: †Ammonoidea
- Order: †Ammonitida
- Family: †Hildoceratidae
- Genus: †Frechiella; Prinz, 1904

Frechiella is an ammonite with a smooth, somewhat globose involute shell that lived during the later part of the Early Jurassic, which has been found in England and Italy. The shell is coiled so that the outer whorls cover most of the inner, leaving the inner whorls only slightly exposed. The outer rim, known as the venter, is broadly arched, with either a low narrow keel bordered by small grooves, or a large median groove.

Frechiella is included in the Hildoceratidae, a family of Jurassic ammonoid cephalopods that are part of the Hildocerataceae.
