= Yakounia =

Yakounia Temporal range: Toarcian

Scientific classification
- Kingdom: Animalia
- Phylum: Mollusca
- Class: Cephalopoda
- Subclass: †Ammonoidea
- Order: †Ammonitida
- Family: †Hildoceratidae
- Genus: †Yakounia; Jakobs & Smith, 1996

Genus of molluscs (fossil)

Yakounia is a genus of evolutely coiled, planispiral ammonite, coiled so all whorls are exposed, with close transverse ribbing. This genus lived during the Toarcian stage, late early Jurassic, and has been found in western British Columbia. The brief description is based on that of the subfamily.

Yakounia is included in the hildoceratid family, subfamily Grammoceratinae. Related genera include such as Grammoceras, Costigrammoceras, and Phenakocerites
