= Fontannesia =

Fontannesia Temporal range: Aalenian–Bajocian

Scientific classification
- Kingdom: Animalia
- Phylum: Mollusca
- Class: Cephalopoda
- Subclass: †Ammonoidea
- Order: †Ammonitida
- Family: †Sonniniidae
- Subfamily: †Witchelliinae
- Genus: †Fontannesia; Buchman, 1902

Genus of molluscs (fossil)

Fontannesia is an ammonoid cephalopod genus with a small to medium size, evolute, discoidal shell that was extant during the Jurassic Period. The sides are ribbed, the venter has a single median keel, and tubercles are lacking.

Fontannesia is included in the Sonniniidae (Hildoceratoidea) and has been found widespread in Europe, western Australia, Canada, and Argentina.
