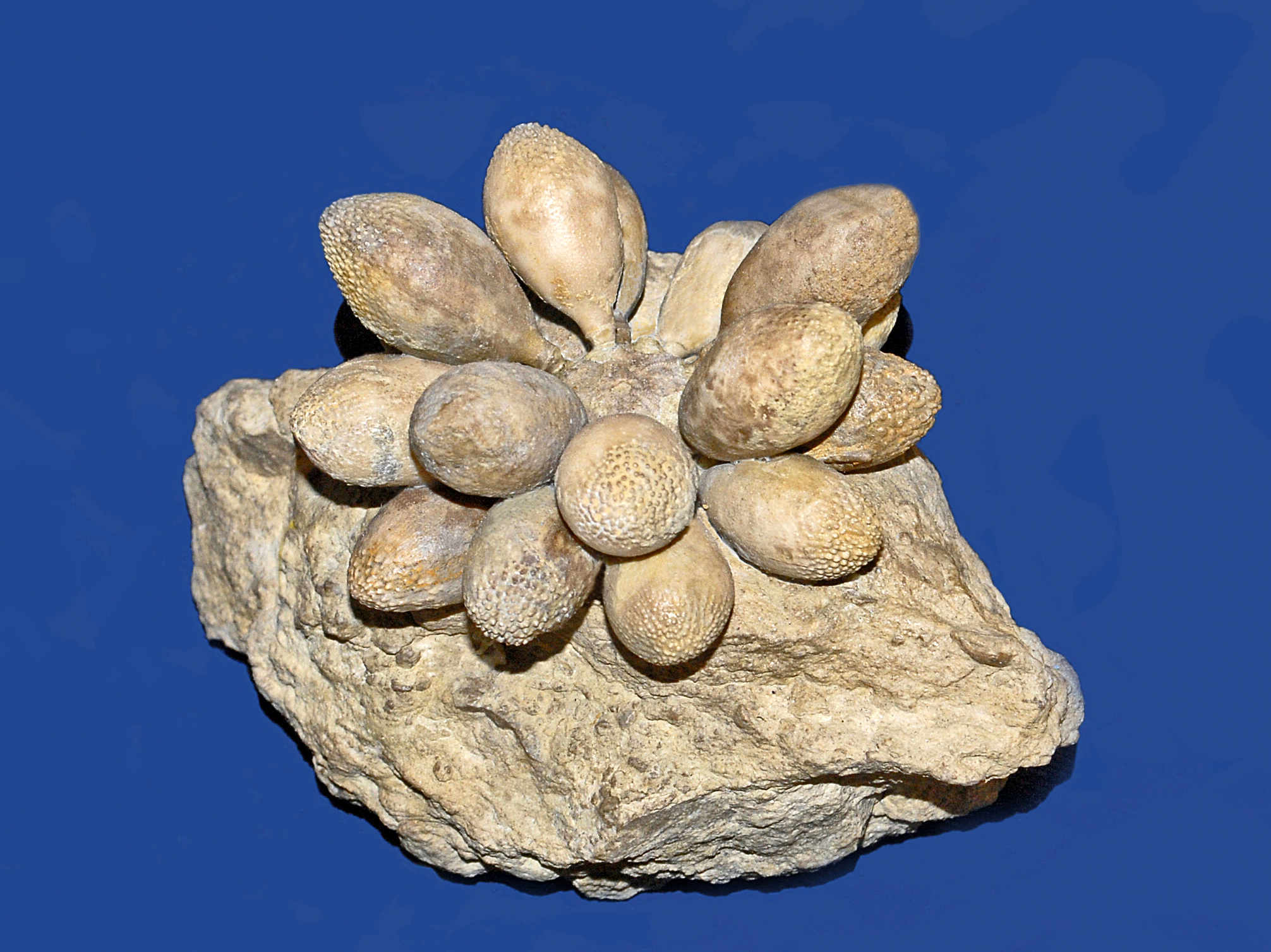
- Fossil of Asterocidaris species from Morocco

Scientific classification
- Kingdom: Animalia
- Phylum: Echinodermata
- Class: Echinoidea
- Infraclass: Carinacea
- Family: †Hemicidaridae
- Genus: †Asterocidaris; Cotteau, 1859

= Asterocidaris =

Asterocidaris Temporal range: Jurassic

Fossil genus of sea urchins

Asterocidaris is a genus of fossils sea urchins in the family Hemicidaridae. These epifaunal grazer-deposit feeders lived in the Middle and Upper Jurassic age (from 171.6 to 161.2 Ma).

== Species ==
- Asterocidaris besairiei Lambert, 1936 †
- Asterocidaris meandrina (Agassiz 1840) †
- Asterocidaris ragoti Lambert, 1936 †

== Description ==
These fossil spined echinoid sea urchins can reach a diameter of about 25 millimetres (0.98 in), with spicules of about 69x60mm. They are hemispherical, flattened beneath, with small apical disc.

== Distribution ==
Fossils of species within this genus have been found in the Middle to Upper Jurassic sediments (Bajocian-Oxfordian) in Europe, Madagascar and Africa (Morocco).

== Gallery ==
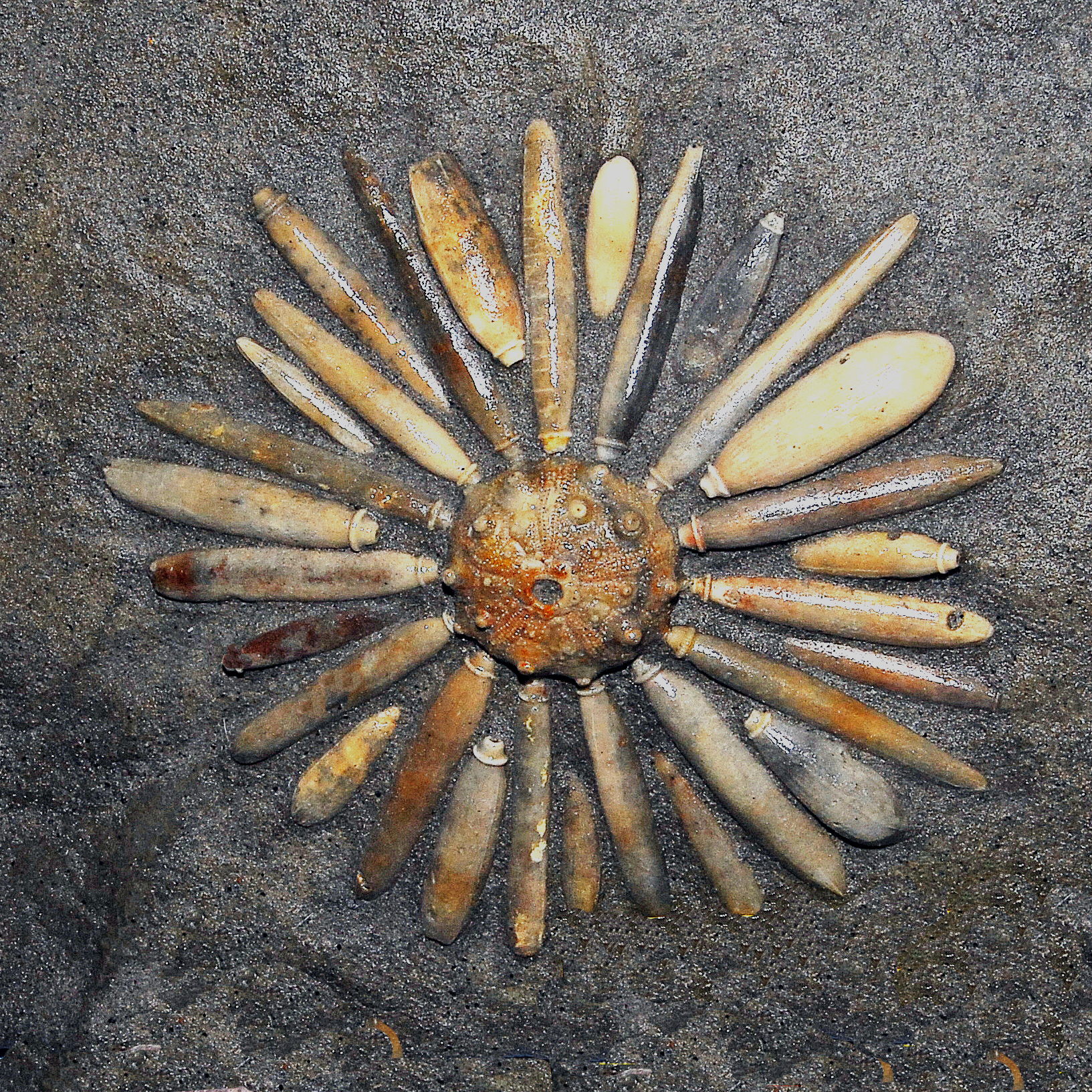
Fossil of Asterocidaris bistriata (Gauthier, 1903)

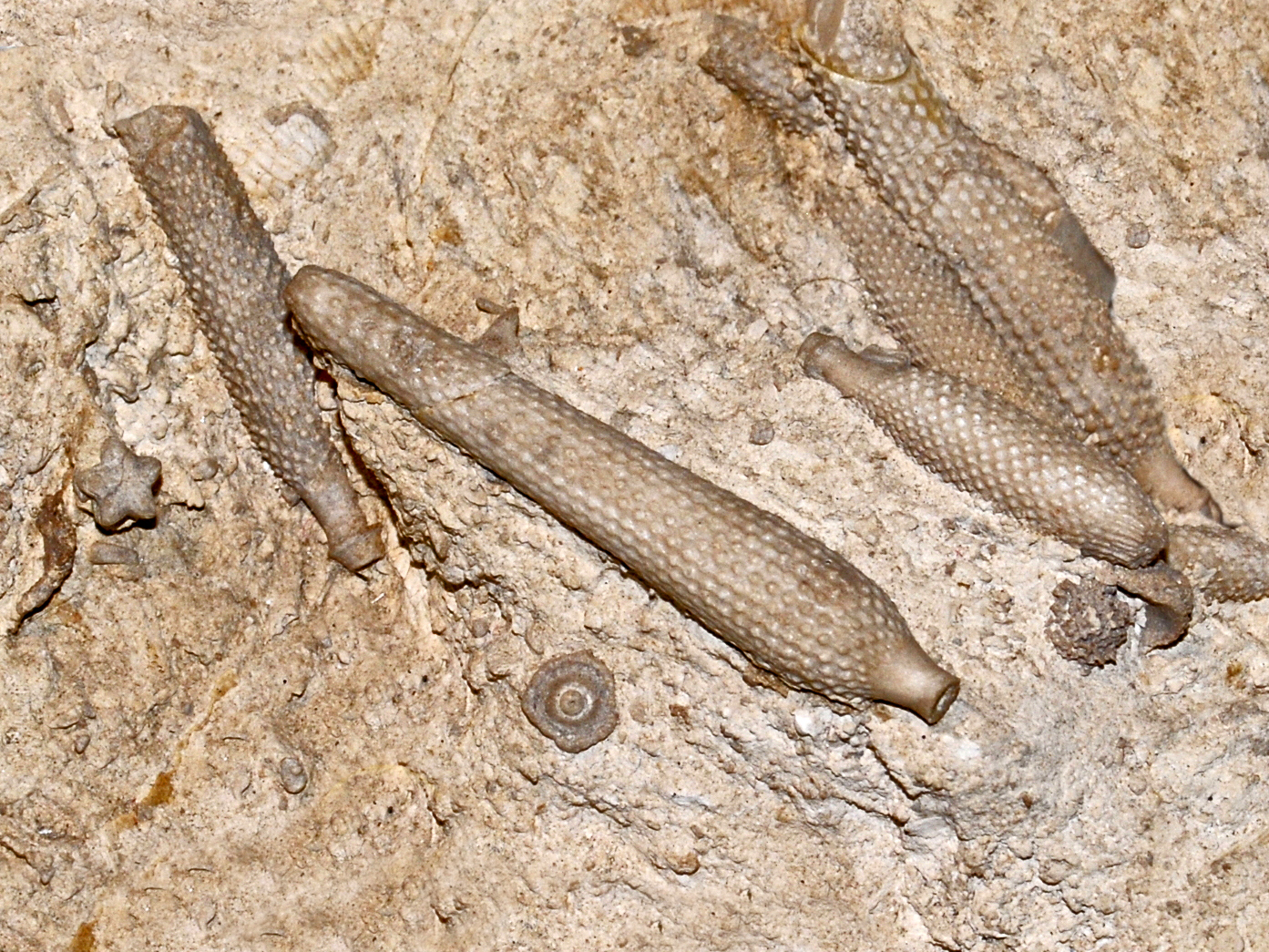
Fossil spicules of Asterocidaris meandrina
