= Asthenoceras =

Asthenoceras Temporal range: Bajocian

Scientific classification
- Kingdom: Animalia
- Phylum: Mollusca
- Class: Cephalopoda
- Subclass: †Ammonoidea
- Order: †Ammonitida
- Family: †Sonniniidae
- Subfamily: †Witchelliinae
- Genus: †Asthenoceras; Buckman, 1899

Species
- †A. nannodes Westermann, 1969; †A. delicatum

Genus of molluscs (fossil)

Asthenoceras is a genus of ammonoid from the Middle Jurassic (Lower Bajocian) with dwarfish, evolute, smooth, compressed, discoidal, strongly keeled shell. Asthenoceras belongs to the Sonniniidae and may be a subgenus of the Lower Jurassic (Upper Toarcian) Grammoceras.
