= Zurcheria =

Zurcheria Temporal range: Bajocian

Scientific classification
- Kingdom: Animalia
- Phylum: Mollusca
- Class: Cephalopoda
- Subclass: †Ammonoidea
- Order: †Ammonitida
- Family: †Hammatoceratidae
- Subfamily: †Zurcheriinae
- Genus: †Zurcheria; Douville, 1885

Genus of molluscs (fossil)

Zurcheria is a genus of dwarf ammonites from the Middle Jurassic included in the Hammatoceratidae and lacking a keel. The shell is evolute, inner whorls exposed; whorls compressed and slightly overlapping. Bears ribs, which are sinuous folds that project strongly onto the arched venter.
