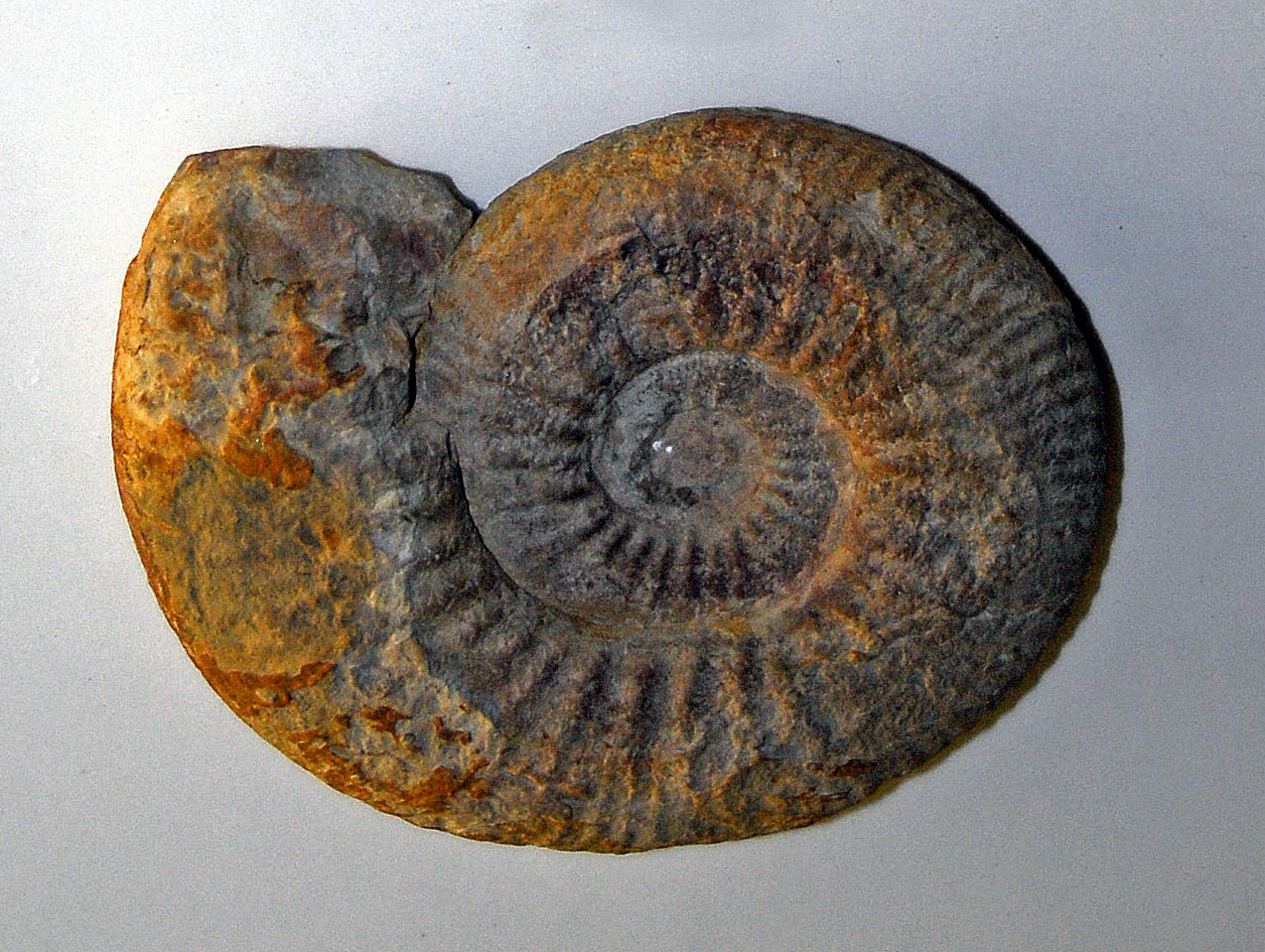
- Fossil of Geczyceras porcarellense. Museum specimen

Scientific classification
- Domain: Eukaryota
- Kingdom: Animalia
- Phylum: Mollusca
- Class: Cephalopoda
- Subclass: †Ammonoidea
- Order: †Ammonitida
- Family: †Hammatoceratidae
- Subfamily: †Hammatoceratinae
- Genus: †Hammatoceras; Hyatt, 1867

= Hammatoceras =

Hammatoceras Temporal range: Toarcian

Genus of molluscs (fossil)

Hammatoceras is a genus of ammonites belonging to the family Hammatoceratidae which lived during the Toarcian stage of the Early/Lower Jurassic between about 184 and 175 million year ago.

== Taxonomy ==
Hammatoceras is included in the subfamily Hammatoceratinae, which in the outdated 1957 Treatise on Invertebrate Paleontology was part of the Hammatoceratidae, but of the Phymatoceratidae in D.T. Donovan et al. In 1981, a case of what to base the family name on. Both accordingly contain the earlier Phytmatoceratinae and derived Hammatoceratinae. The superfamily Hammatoceratoidea in which the Hammatocaratidae and related families are currently placed is abandoned in favor of the older, equivalent, Hildoceratoidea. (M. K. Howarth. 2013)

== Species ==
Species within this genus include:

- ?Hammatoceras gabillyi Martinez, 1992
- Hammatoceras insigne Schubler, 1831
- ?Hammatoceras costatum (Gabilly, 1973)
- Hammatoceras pachu Buckman, 1921
- Hammatoceras clausum Gabilly, 1973
- Hammatoceras semilunatum Quenstedt, 1885
- Hammatoceras roubanense Elmi, 1998
- Hammatoceras bonarellii Parisch & Viale, 1906
- Hammatoceras subplanatum De Brun, 1932
- Hammatoceras speciosum Janensch, 1902

== Fossil record ==
This genus is known in the fossil record in the Middle Jurassic, from 175.6 million years ago to about 171.6 million years ago. Fossil shells within this genus have been found in Canada, France, Germany, Hungary, Indonesia, Italy, Spain, Tunisia and the United Kingdom.

== Description ==
The shell of Hammatoceras varies from evolute to sub-involute, according to species and growth stage. All are compressed, i.e. discoidal, in form, with strong ribbing and a keeled ventor. Ribs arise from tubercles on the umbilical shoulder, the inner, dorso-lateral margin of the whorls, and bifurcate on the flanks, stopping at the ventral keel. Juvenile forms tend to be more evolute with more of the inner whorls showing, whereas mature forms tend to be more involute with outer whorls more strongly embracing.
