= Grammoceras =

Grammoceras Temporal range: Toarcian

Scientific classification
- Kingdom: Animalia
- Phylum: Mollusca
- Class: Cephalopoda
- Subclass: †Ammonoidea
- Order: †Ammonitida
- Family: †Hildoceratidae
- Subfamily: †Grammoceratinae
- Genus: †Grammoceras; Hyatt, 1867

Species
- Grammoceras striatulum (Sowerby, 1825); Grammoceras chateleti (De Brun, 1929); Grammoceras thouarsense (D'Orbigny, 1843); Grammoceras penestriatulum (Buckman, 1902); Grammoceras arenaceum (m) (Buckman, 1904); Grammoceras glabrum (m) (Monestier, 1921)

Genus of ammonite

Grammoceras is an extinct genus of ammonite found in Yorks Ravenscar, England, from Jurassic period sediments. Its overall distribution is fairly worldwide.

Grammoceras has a thin, discoidally evolute shell with simple, gently sigmoid ribbing and a low ventral keel. Dumortiera and Catulloceras from the same age are similar except that Dumortiera has a more rounded venter and Catulloceras has a subquadrate whorl section. Asthenoceras from the slightly younger lower Bajocian may be a subgenus.
