= Haplopleuroceras =

Haplopleuroceras Temporal range: Bajocian

Scientific classification
- Kingdom: Animalia
- Phylum: Mollusca
- Class: Cephalopoda
- Subclass: †Ammonoidea
- Order: †Ammonitida
- Family: †Hammatoceratidae
- Subfamily: †Zurcheriinae
- Genus: †Haplopleuroceras; Buckman, 1892

Genus of molluscs (fossil)

Haplopleuroceras is a Middle Jurassic ammonite and likely member of the Hildoceratacean family Sonniniidae with which it shares the same sort of ribbing.

== Description ==
Haplopleuoceras has a small, strongly ribbed, evolute shell of about 2 1/2 volutions. Whorl section is subquadrate, slightly compressed, flanks slightly convex, venter rounded. Ribs are undivided, smooth, moderately concave, and slope forward on the ventro-lateral region to form chevrons pointing toward the aperture. The venter on the outer rim is bisected by a rounded keel bordered by distinct but shallow grooves, interrupting the ribbing in the middle of the chevrons.

Haplopleuroceras shares its simple undivided ribbing with the contemporary Sonniniidae in which it probably belongs (e.g. Treatise L, 1957) although others since then (e.g. Donovan et al. 1981) have removed it to the Hammatoceratidae. The Hammatoceratidae, the oldest of which predate the Sonniniidae so as to be their most likely predecessors, are however characterized by primary and secondary ribs which bifurcate on the flanks and cross the venter, often transversely.
