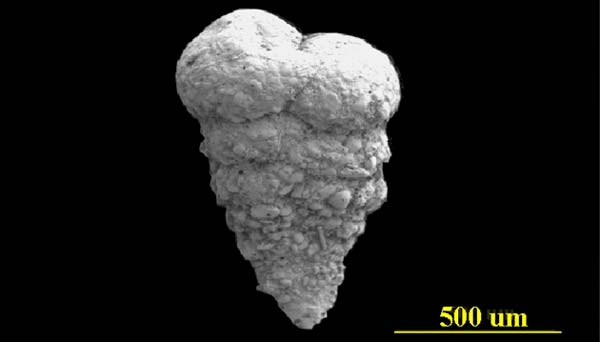

Scientific classification
- Domain: Eukaryota
- Supergroup: Rhizaria
- Phylum: Foraminifera
- Class: Globothalamea
- Order: Textulariida
- Family: Textulariidae
- Subfamily: Textulariinae
- Genus: Textularia; Defrance, 1824

= Textularia =

Textularia Temporal range: Late Carboniferous - Present

Genus of single-celled organisms

Textularia is a genus of textulariid foraminiferans. It includes many vagile inbenthic species of normal salinity seawater.
