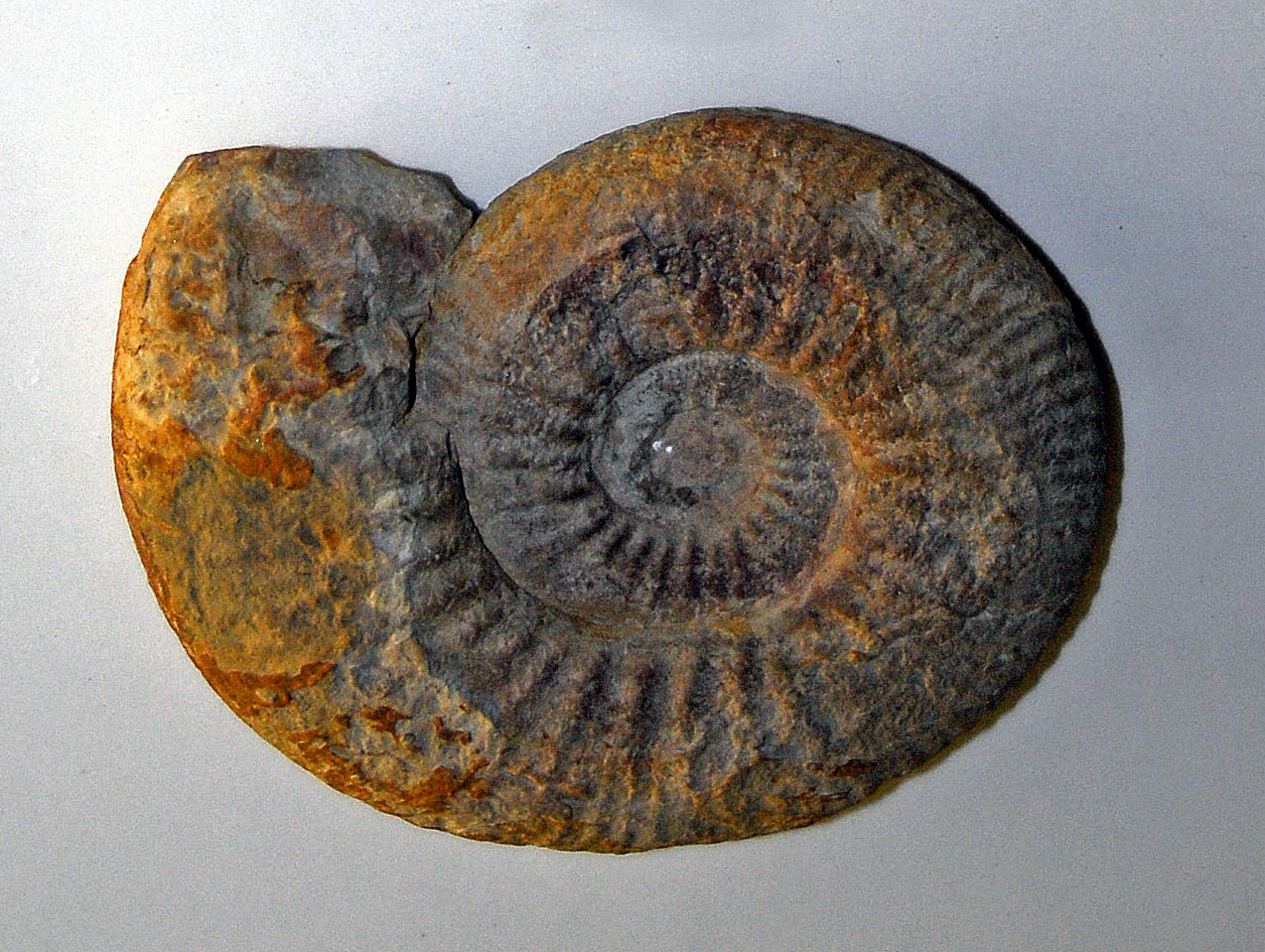
- Fossil of Geczyceras porcarellense

Scientific classification
- Domain: Eukaryota
- Kingdom: Animalia
- Phylum: Mollusca
- Class: Cephalopoda
- Subclass: †Ammonoidea
- Order: †Ammonitida
- Superfamily: †Hildoceratoidea
- Family: †Hammatoceratidae; Buckman, 1887

Subfamilies
- See text

= Hammatoceratidae =

Hammatoceratidae Temporal range: Hettangian–Callovian

Extinct family of ammonites

Hammatoceratidae is a family of lower and middle Jurassic ammonites included in the superfamily Hildoceratoidea.

== Diagnosis ==
Hammatoceratidae comprises genera which are characterized by ribbed evolute shells (all whorls visible), some bearing keels along the venter. Those in the Phymatoceratinae have more simple ribbing while those in the Hammatoceratinae have ribbing that branch higher up on the whorl sides, divided into primaries and secondaries.

== Taxonomy ==
In the outdated classification of the 1957 American Treatise on Invertebrate Paleontology, Hammatoceratidae was included in the superfamily Hildoceratoidea and divided into two subfamilies, the earlier Phymatoceratinae, and later Hammatoceratinae.

Hammatoceratidae is now divided into four subfamilies, the Hammatoceratinae, Erycitinae, Podagrosiceratinae, and Zurcheriinae.

Hammatoceratinae includes Rarenodia, Geczyceras, Bredyia, Parammatoceras, Crestaites, Erycitoides, Euaptetoceras, Eudmetoceras, Fissilobiceras, Hammatoceras, Onychoceras, Paviatites, Planammatoceras, Pseudaptetoceras, and Puchenquia. Fissilobiceras, included in the Sonniniidae in the Treatise, 1957, differs from typical hammatoceratids in being rather involude and smooth shelled.

The Erycitinae is said to include Praerycites, Erycites, Abbasites, Abbasitoides, Shahrudites and Cagliceras. The Treatise Part L, 1957, includes Erycites and Abbasites in the Hammatoceratinae. Cagliceras, named by Rulleau and Elmi, was added in 2001.

Podagrosiceratinae named by Westermann and Riccardi, 1979, includes Podagrosiceras Maubeuge and Lambert, 1956, Sphaerocoeloceras, and Westermanniceras. D.T. Donovan, et al.,1981 recognized Sphaerocoeloceras as a hammatoceratid rather than a dactyloceratid as in the Treatise.

Zurcheriinae, Hyatt 1900, includes Zurcheria, H.Douville, 1885, Haplopleuroceras, Malladaites, and Spinammatoceras. Zurcheria and Haplopleuroceras are included in the Sonniniidae in the Treatise Part L.

== Evolution and phylogeny ==
The Hammatoceratidae with its four subfamilies has its origin in the Phymatoceratidae, with the subfamily Hammatoceratinae giving rise to the subfamilies Erycitinae and Podagrosiceratinae. If Zurcheria and Haplopleuroceras belong in the Sonniniidae, the Zurcheriinae must thereby be derived and therefore belongs to the Sonniniidae.
