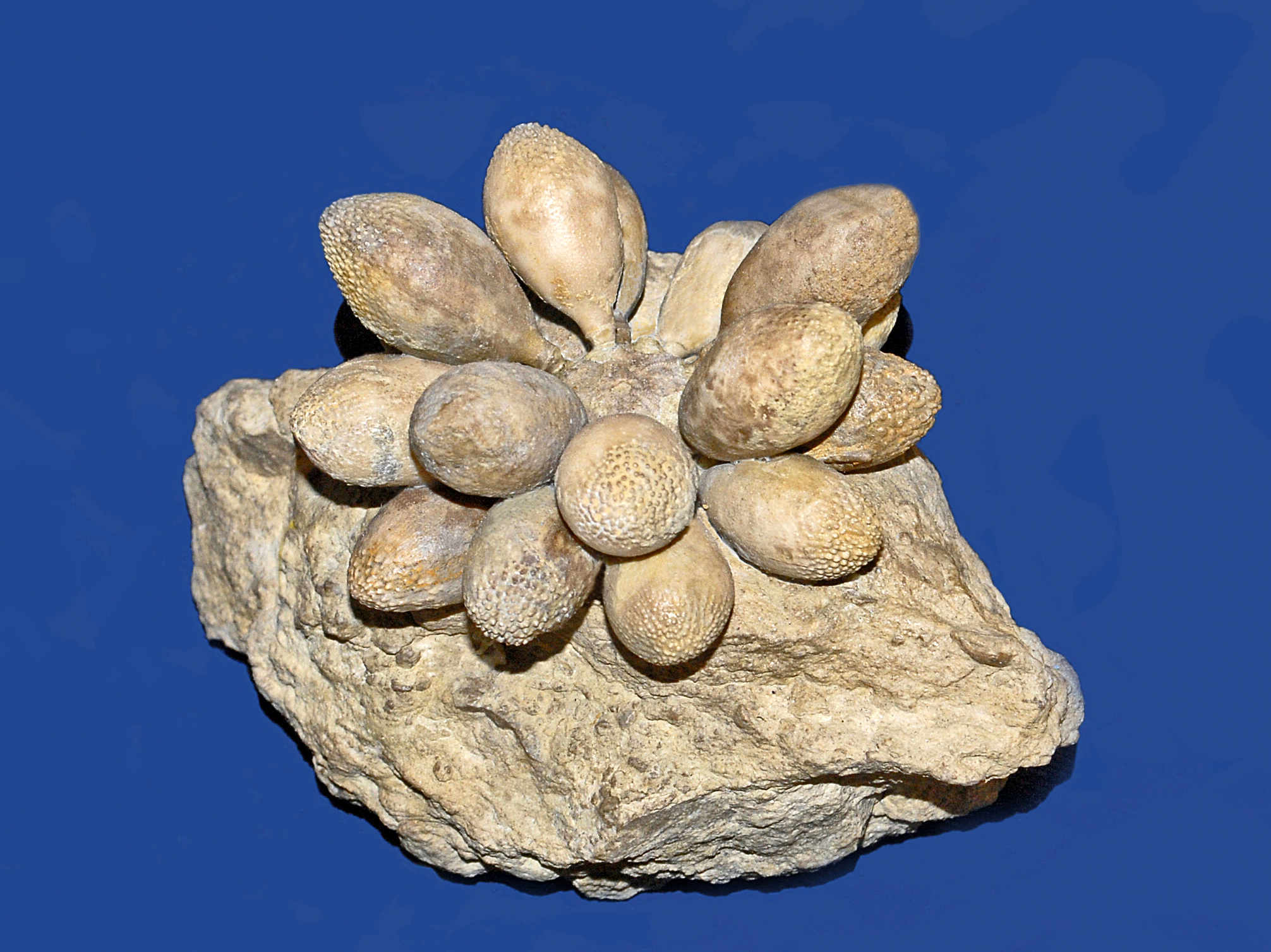
- Fossil of Asterocidaris species

Scientific classification
- Kingdom: Animalia
- Phylum: Echinodermata
- Class: Echinoidea
- Subclass: Euechinoidea
- Infraclass: Carinacea
- Family: †Hemicidaridae; Wright, 1857

= Hemicidaridae =

Hemicidaridae Temporal range: Jurassic- Cretaceous

Extinct family of sea urchins

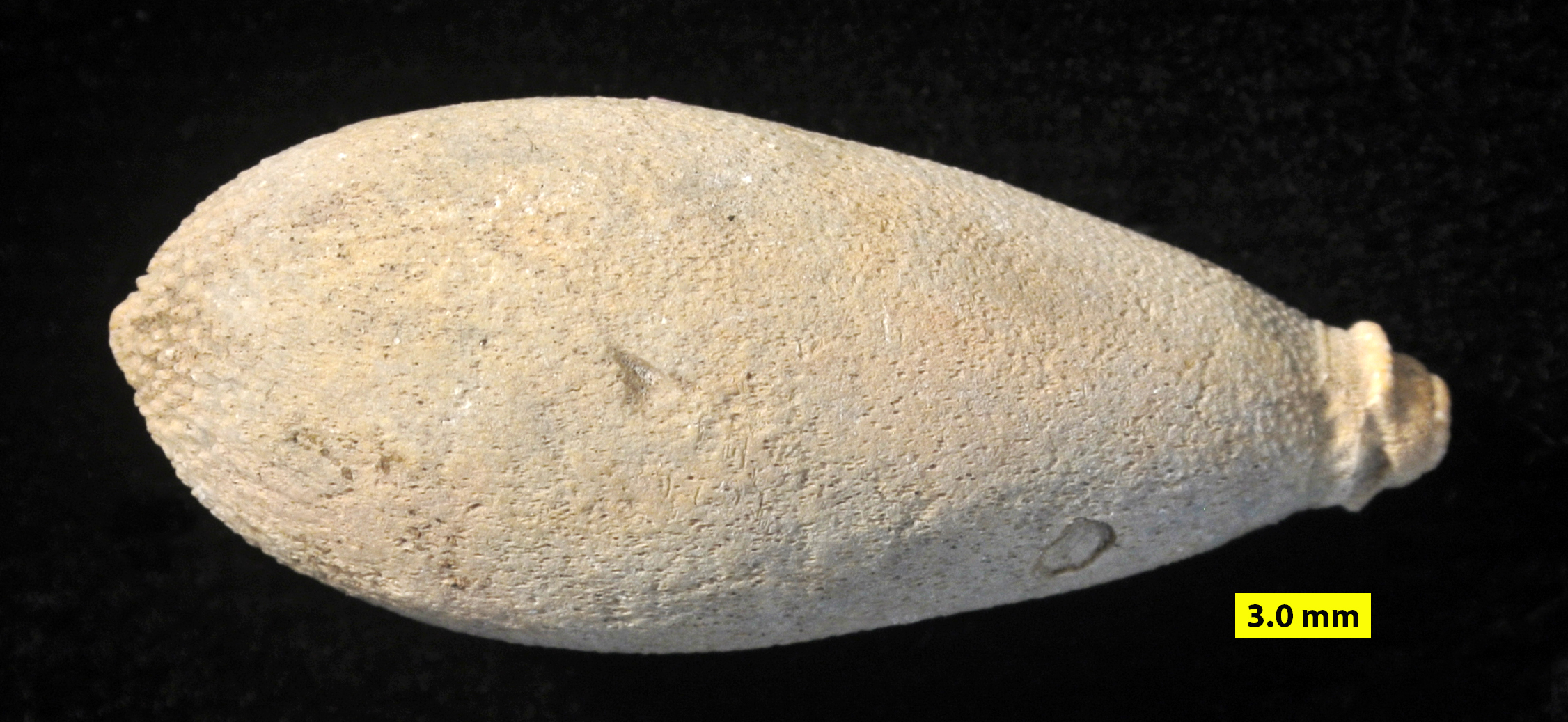
Pseudocidaris spine; Matmor Formation (Middle Jurassic) of Makhtesh Gadol, Israel.

Hemicidaridae is a family of extinct sea urchins characterized by large, massive, club-shaped spines.

These epifaunal grazer-deposit feeders lived in Jurassic and Cretaceous ages (from 189.6 to 112.6 Ma).

== Taxonomy ==
List of genera and subfamilies:

- Subfamily Hemicidarinae Wright, 1857 †

Asterocidaris Cotteau, 1859 †
Gymnocidaris L. Agassiz, 1838 †
Hemicidaris L. Agassiz, 1838 †

- Subfamily Pseudocidarinae Smith & Wright, 1993 †

Cidaropsis Cotteau, 1863 †
Pseudocidaris Pomel, 1883 †
Gymnocidaris L. Agassiz, 1838 †

== Distribution ==
Fossils of species within this genus have been found in the Jurassic and Cretaceous sediments in Europe, Africa, North America and China.
