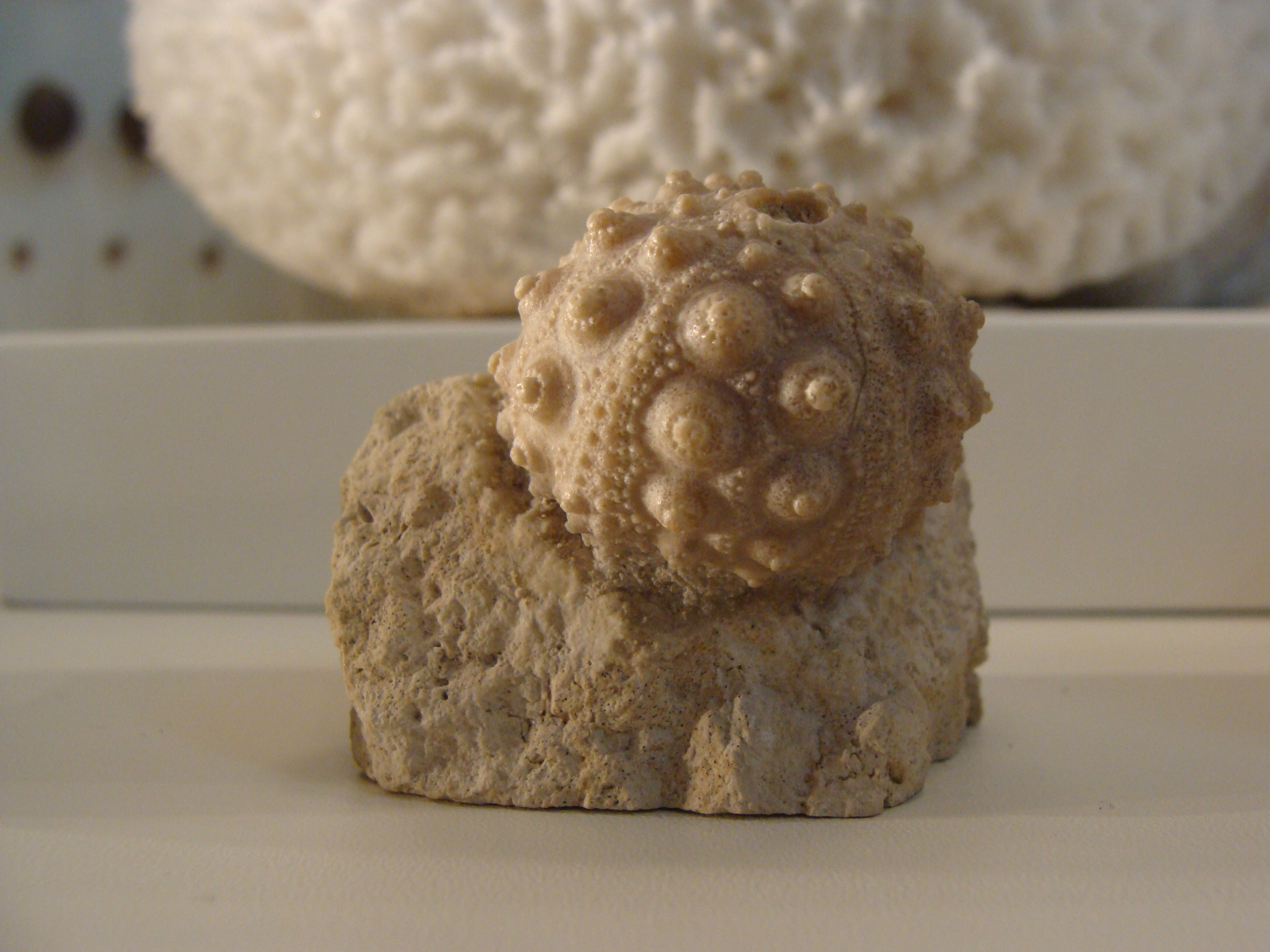
- Hemicidaris intermedia fossil from France in Cosmocaixa, Barcelona.

Scientific classification
- Kingdom: Animalia
- Phylum: Echinodermata
- Class: Echinoidea
- Family: †Hemicidaridae
- Genus: †Hemicidaris; L. Agassiz, 1838

= Hemicidaris =

Hemicidaris Temporal range: Middle Jurassic-Early Cretaceous

Extinct genus of sea urchins

Hemicidaris is an extinct genus of echinoids that lived from the Middle Jurassic to the Early Cretaceous. Its remains have been found in Africa, Asia, and Europe.
