= Eudmetoceras =

Eudmetoceras Temporal range: Aalenian–Bajocian

Scientific classification
- Kingdom: Animalia
- Phylum: Mollusca
- Class: Cephalopoda
- Subclass: †Ammonoidea
- Order: †Ammonitida
- Family: †Hammatoceratidae
- Subfamily: †Hammatoceratinae
- Genus: †Eudmetoceras; Buckman, 1920

Genus of molluscs (fossil)

Eudmetoceras is an extinct genus from a well-known class of fossil cephalopods, the ammonites. It lived during the Jurassic Period, which lasted from 171.6 to 168.4 million years ago.
