= Sonniniidae =

Sonniniidae Temporal range: Middle Jurassic

Scientific classification
- Kingdom: Animalia
- Phylum: Mollusca
- Class: Cephalopoda
- Subclass: †Ammonoidea
- Order: †Ammonitida
- Superfamily: †Hildoceratoidea
- Family: †Sonniniidae; Buckman, 1892

Genera
- see text

Extinct family of ammonites

Sonniniidae is a diverse family of Middle Jurassic ammonites ranging from those with stout evolute shells to those whose shells are sharply rimmed, oxyconic. The keel, which runs along the middle of the venter, is typically hollow. Sutures vary from simple to complex. The aptychus is shiny with coarse folds (Cornaptychus).

Sonniniidae are included in the superfamily Hildoceratoidea. Most lived during the middle Bajocian stage. Distribution is worldwide except for boreal.

== Taxonomy ==
Sonniniidae is divided into subfamilies with 10 genera.

- Sonniniidae Buckman, 1892
  - Sonniniinae Buckman, 1892
    - Dorsetensia
    - Pseudoshirbuirnia Dietz, 2005
    - Shirbuirnia
    - Sonninia
    - Sonninites Buckman, 1923
  - Witchelliinae Callomon and Chandler, 2006
    - Asthenoceras
    - Fontannesia
    - Guhsania
    - Newmarracarroceras Hall, 1989
    - Witchellia

== Distribution ==
Argentina, Canada, China, Germany, Hungary, Morocco, Saudi Arabia, Spain, the United Kingdom.
