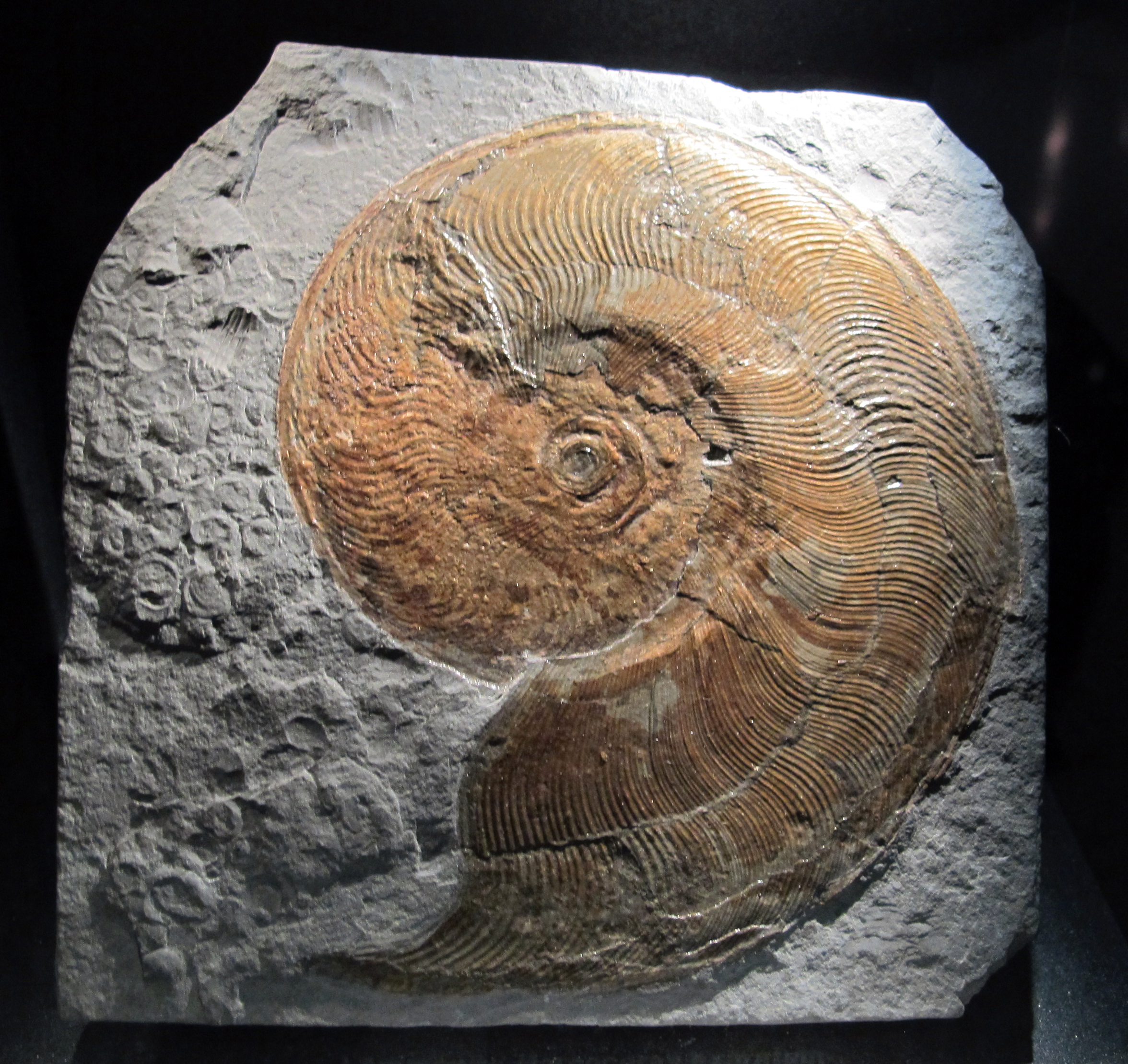
- Harpoceras exaratum

Scientific classification
- Kingdom: Animalia
- Phylum: Mollusca
- Class: Cephalopoda
- Subclass: †Ammonoidea
- Order: †Ammonitida
- Suborder: †Ammonitina
- Superfamily: †Hildoceratoidea; Hyatt, 1867

Families
- Erycitidae; Hildoceratidae; Hammatoceratidae; Graphoceratidae; Sonniniidae

= Hildoceratoidea =

Hildoceratoidea Temporal range: Early—Middle Jurassic, Pliensbachian–Bajocian

Extinct superfamily of ammonites

Hildoceratoidea, formerly Hildoceratacaea, is a superfamily of compressed or planulate ammonites, some tending to develop acute outer rims; generally with arcuate or sigmoidal ribs. Aptichus were found in place are double-valved.

Hildoceratoidea is an upper Lower to lower Middle Jurassic group belonging to the Ammonitina that unites the Hildoceratidae, Hammatoceratidae, Graphoceratidae, and Sonniniidae. In some taxonomies the name Phymatoceratidae is substituted for the Hammatoceratidae

Hildoceratidae, which is the ancestral family, is derived from the Acanthopleuroceratinae, a subfamily in the Eoderoceratoidean family, Polyorphitidae. The Stephanoceratoidea, Perisphinctoidea, and Haploceratoidea have their source in the Hammatoceratidae which is derived from the Hildoceratidae.

Approximate timeline of Hildoceratoidea families with their evolutionary relationships.
