= Krempachy Marl Formation =

Geological formation in Poland and Slovakia

- Stratigraphic range: Toarcian-Bajocian; ~184–168 Ma
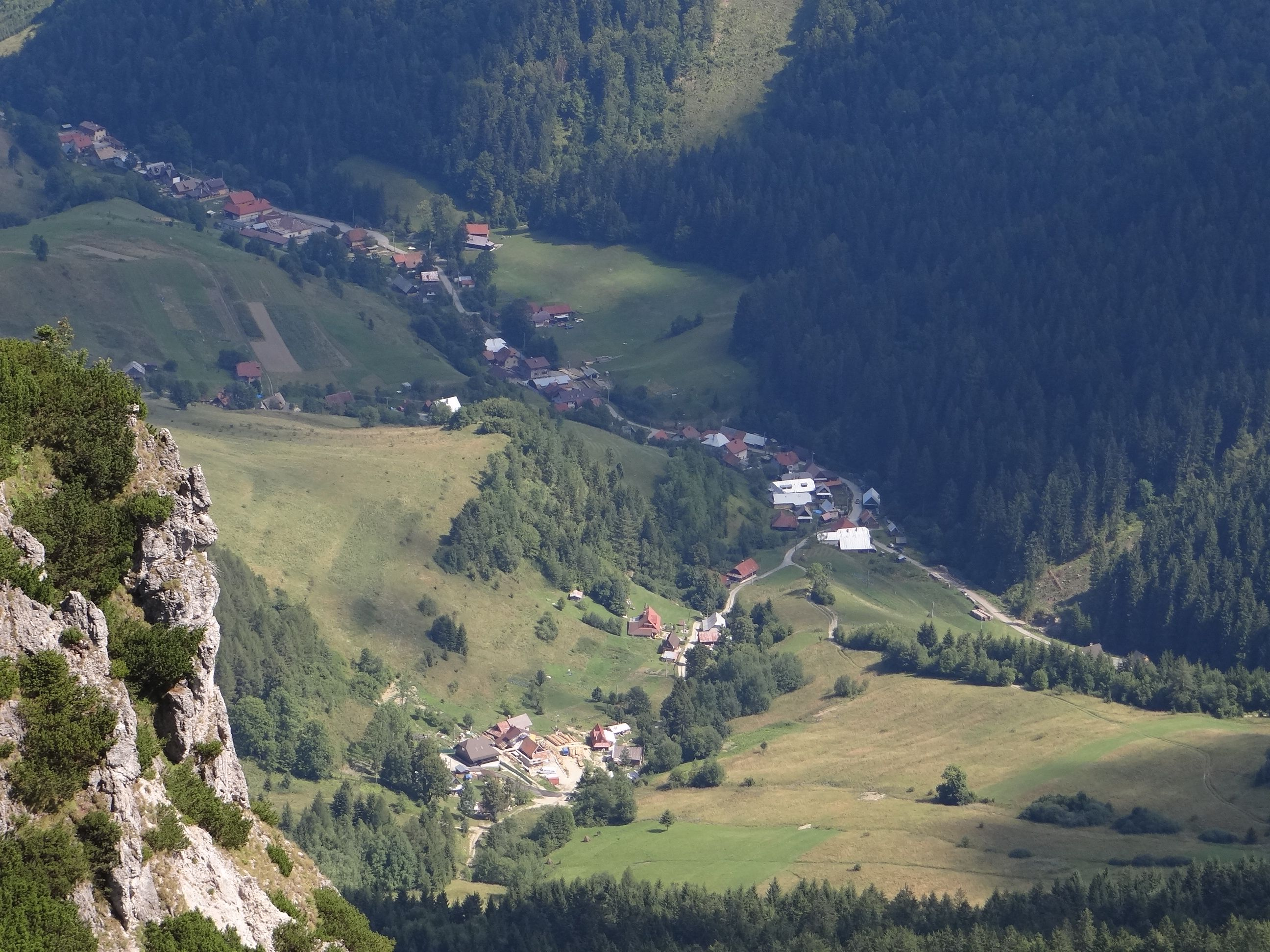
- Panoramic of Zázrivá, rich in outcrops of this unit
- Type: Geological formation
- Unit of: Pieniny Klippen Belt
- Underlies: Podzamcze Limestone, Skrzypny & Harcygrund Shale
- Overlies: Allgäu Formation & Orava Unit
- Area: Western Carpathians
- Thickness: 10–30 m (33–98 ft)

Lithology
- Primary: Marl & limestone
- Other: Lithified limestone

Location
- Region: Nowy Targ County-Prešov Region, West Carpathians
- Country: Poland, Slovakia

Type section
- Named for: Krempachy, a village in southern Poland
- Named by: Birkenmajer
- Year defined: 1977

The Krempachy Marl Formation is a geological formation in Poland and Slovakia, dating to about 184-168 million years ago, and covering the Toarcian-Bajocian stages of the Jurassic Period. It is among the most important formations of the Toarcian boundary on the Carpathian realm, being the regional equivalent of the Posidonia Shale.

The formation has been considered as following the model of the Fleckenmergel Marl, without macroscopic paleodepths implicated on the processes. The facies of the formation developed on the Pieniny Klippen Basin, being influenced by the widespread of the Late Liassic Tethys. The formation was a succession of nearshore to epicontinental deposits, with several of the only Toarcian terrestrial deposits know from the Bohemian Massif. It also gives one of the few limited insights into paleoceanographic changes that took place in this area during this key time interval.

== Geology ==
The Pieniny Klippen Belt represents an axial tectonic zone on the West Carpathians, with a narrow structure, that extends a several hundred kilometers long structural zone belonging to the Carpathian sector of the Alpide belt, and separates the Southern Carpathian and the Central Carpathian. While the Pliensbachian-Toarcian boundary is nearly unknown on the Belt, the Toarcian to Bajocian succession is present on various points. The belt is a Laramian Front inside the Central Carpathian Orogenic Wedge, that had a re-folded along with a strong compressed process during the Alpine thrusting of the Outer Carpathians in the Neogene. The belt has a series of lithofacies patterns that recover from the Middle Jurassic to the Lower Cretaceous paleogeographical changes on the east Bohemian Massif margin, and reflects a paleobathymetric gradient change, that was developed around the Czorsztyn Swell de to a crustal block of Oravicum, correlated to the contemporaneous Briançonnais. The Toarcian basin was located to the north of Oravicum, being on the NE of the North European Shelf. It was an area that suffered from Middle Jurassic that would have ended forming the Magura Basin. After that, sedimentary infill was translated northward to the nearshore platforms, and then formed nappe structures and flysch mélange. The view and reconstruction of the sedimentary basins on the Toarcian realm is very complicated, since they lost their original geometry due to tectonic works and deformations on the Noegene, abundant allochthonous material and several hiatus on the strata.

== Sedimentology ==
The strata of the formation is composed by grey-blue marl & limestones. The formation overlies Sinemurian to Pliensbachian deposits of the Orava Unit, where there is disposed a southwest bedding dipping. The lowermost part of the strata recovers spotted limestone beds & alternations of dark Marls that are equivalent to the uppermost Allgäu Formation. Over the marls there is a series of dark shales that had intercalated siltstones, that mark the start of the main Krempachy Marl Formation. The marls of the main formation strata are covered on Ammonite fragments, intercalated with Dinoflagellates. There is a condensation of the Lower-Middle Toarcian deposits throughout the Western Carpathians. As that, in the Pieniny Klippen Belt, sections like the Tenuicostatum and Serpentinum zones of the early Toarcian are or completely missing or strongly condensed. Altroght sections such as Zázrivá A provide the first record of the T-OAE from all Western Carpathians. Zázrivá A has an expressure of 36 m, oriented to the Southwest.

== Lithology ==
The Krempachy Marl is rich in black shales in its lowermost parts, which are locally rich in macrofauna, including ammonites, soft-bodied cephalopods, bivalves, crustaceans and fish remains. Manganese mineralization is also common in the oldest part, something shared with most of the coeval Alpine Tethys successions. Due to that, there is a high concentration of Mn contents (6 to 10 wt%). Typical Toarcian sections of the Orava Succession are represented by condensed red marls, marly limestones, and/or red nodular limestones, being locally rich in ammonites.

== Fossil content ==
Geochemical, palynological and mineralogical framboid data show that dysoxic to euxinic conditions occurred in an epicontinental basin located close to the Tethys open-ocean during the T-OAE, and continued after it. Organic-rich sedimentation and anoxic conditions were clearly shorter-lived in the southern basins, where evidence for elevated organic carbon burial is generally restricted to the CIE. There are results that indicate poor oxygenation, elevated carbon and sulfur burial developed in basins located very close to the open-ocean masses of the Tethys Ocean, similar to modern large euxinic basins. The basin was located between Oravicum, with an initial area of ~100,000 square kilometers, and the NW-European shelf and has been associated with considerable amounts of sulfur and carbon during the T-OAE. The presence of brown wood traces has been interpreted as reflecting the proximity of land areas, with fluvial run-off supplying fresh phytoclasts. Although most of the basin lacks unequivocal palynological evidence for brackish conditions, such as the freshwater green algae Botryococcus, being related to effects due to changes in oxygenation.

Color key: Taxon / Reclassified taxon / Taxon falsely reported as present / Dubious taxon or junior synonym / Ichnotaxon / Ootaxon / Morphotaxon	Notes; Uncertain or tentative taxa are in small text; ~~crossed out~~ taxa are discredited.

=== Microbiota ===
Taxa	Species	Locality	Material	Notes	Images
Ammobaculites	sp.	Krempachy; Biała Woda; Podubocze	Tests	Agglutinated foraminifer	
Ammodiscus	incertus	Orava Valley	Tests	Agglutinated foraminifer	
Astacolus	anceps	Podubocze	Tests	Nodosariidae	
Astrorhizids	spp.	Krempachy; Biała Woda; Podubocze	Tests	Tubular agglutinated foraminifers	
Carinolithus	poulnabronei	Zázrivá	Nannofossils	Coccolithophyceae	
Carinolithus	superbus	Zázrivá	Nannofossils	Coccolithophyceae	
Carinolithus	impontus	Zázrivá	Nannofossils	Coccolithophyceae	
Crinoid	Indeterminate	Krempachy; Biała Woda; Podubocze	Fragments	Echinodermata	
Dentalina	vetustissima	Orava Valley	Tests	Nodosariidae	
Discorhabdus	striatus	Zázrivá	Nannofossils	Coccolithophyceae	
Echinoid	Indeterminate	Krempachy	Spines	Echinodermata	
Eoguttulina	liassica	Niedzica	Tests	Polymorphinidae	
Eoguttulina	sp.	Krempachy; Biała Woda; Podubocze	Tests	Polymorphinidae	
Falsopalmula	deslongchampsi	Podubocze	Tests	Nodosariidae	
Falsopalmula	tenuistriata	Krempachy; Biała Woda; Podubocze	Tests	Nodosariidae	
Frondicularia	sulcata	Orava Valley	Tests	Nodosariidae	
Holothurian	Indeterminate	Krempachy; Biała Woda; Podubocze	Sclerites	Echinodermata	
Hyperammina	sp.	Krempachy; Biała Woda; Podubocze	Tests	Agglutinated foraminifer	
Inaperturopollenites	I. orbiculatus	Zázrivá	Pollen	Pinidae or Cupressaceae.	
Laevidentalina	sp.	Podubocze	Tests	Nodosariidae	
Laevidentalina	subplana	Podubocze	Tests	Nodosariidae	
Lenticulina	d’orbignyi	Podubocze	Tests	Vaginulinidae	
Lenticulina	polygonata	Podubocze	Tests	Vaginulinidae	
Lenticulina	spp.	Krempachy; Biała Woda; Podubocze	Tests	Vaginulinidae	
Lophocythere	sp.	Podubocze	Valve	Ostracoda	
Lotharingius	sigillatus	Zázrivá	Nannofossils	Coccolithophyceae	
Marginulinopsis	dictyodes	Podubocze	Tests	Nodosariidae	
Mitrolithus	jansae	Zázrivá	Nannofossils	Coccolithophyceae	
Nodosaria	fontinensis	Orava Valley	Tests	Nodosariidae	
Nodosaria	regularis	Podubocze	Tests	Nodosariidae	
Nodosariids	spp.	Krempachy; Biała Woda; Podubocze; Orava Valley	Tests	Nodosariidae	
Ophthalmidiids	spp.	Krempachy; Biała Woda; Podubocze	Tests	Ophthalmidiidae	
Ostracods	Indeterminate	Krempachy; Biała Woda; Podubocze; Niedzica; Orava Valley	Valves/Carapaces	Ostracoda (smooth-carapace)	
Patellina	sp.	Biała Woda	Tests	Spirillinidae	
Pseudonodosaria	bajociana	Podubocze	Tests	Nodosariidae	
Pseudonodosaria	sp.	Krempachy; Biała Woda; Podubocze	Tests	Nodosariidae	
Pyramidulina	columnaris	Podubocze	Tests	Nodosariidae	
Pyramidulina	dispar	Podubocze	Tests	Nodosariidae	
Radiolaria	spp.	Krempachy; Biała Woda; Podubocze	Tests	Radiolaria	
Ramulina	spandeli	Podubocze	Tests	Ramulinidae	
Reophax	sp.	Krempachy; Biała Woda; Podubocze	Tests	Agglutinated foraminifer	
Rhabdammina	sp.	Podubocze	Tests	Agglutinated foraminifer	
Reinholdella	spp.	Krempachy; Biała Woda; Niedzica	Tests	Epistominidae	
Polychaete	Indeterminate	Zázrivá	Scolecodonts	Annelids	
Spirillina	elongata	Podubocze	Tests	Spirillinidae	
Spirillina	infima	Podubocze	Tests	Spirillinidae	
Spirillina	spp.	Krempachy; Biała Woda; Podubocze	Tests	Spirillinidae	
Sponge	Indeterminate	Krempachy; Biała Woda; Podubocze	Spicules; Macroscler	Calcarea-Hexactinellid Complex	
Subreophax	sp.	Krempachy; Biała Woda; Podubocze	Tests	Agglutinated foraminifer	
Tolypammina	sp.	Krempachy; Biała Woda; Podubocze	Tests	Agglutinated foraminifer (adherent)	
Tolypammina	inflata	Orava Valley	Tests	Agglutinated foraminifer	
Tolypammina	sp.	Krempachy; Biała Woda; Podubocze	Tests	Agglutinated foraminifer	
Watznaueria	fossacincta	Zázrivá	Nannofossils	Coccolithophyceae	
Watznaueria	spp.	Zázrivá	Nannofossils	Coccolithophyceae	

=== Cephalophoda ===
Genus	Species	Stratigraphic position	Material	Notes	Images
Brasilia	B. spp.	Beňatina	Shells	A Graphoceratid ammonite	
Dumortieria	D. striatulocostata	Zázrivá	Shells	A hildoceratid ammonite	
Eleganticeras	E. cf. elegans; E. cf. exaratum	Zázrivá	Shells	A hildoceratid ammonite	
Graphoceras	G. sp.	Beňatina	Shells	A Graphoceratid ammonite	
Harpoceras	H. ex. gr. falciferum	Zázrivá	Shells	A harpoceratin ammonite	Restoration
Hildaites	H. ex. gr. murleyi-levisoni; H. cf. subserpentinus	Zázrivá	Shells	A hildoceratid ammonite	Hildaites specimen (from Italy)
Ludwigia	L. spp.	Beňatina	Shells	A Graphoceratid ammonite	
Teudopsis	T. bunelii	Zázrivá	Gladius	A Teudopseina squid	Restoration

=== Arthropods ===
Genus	Species	Stratigraphic position	Material	Notes	Images
Dollocaris	D. toarcica	Zázrivá	SNM Z41680, complete shield; Paratypes SNM Z 41034–41041, 41683, nine shields in various states of completeness	A Dollocarididae Thylacocephalan	Dollocaris reconstruction
Zazrivacaris	Z. jodorowskyi	Zázrivá	SNM Z 41047, near-complete shield. Paratype SNM Z 41681, one fragmented shield	A Dollocarididae Thylacocephalan	

=== Crocodrylomorpha ===
Genus	Species	Stratigraphic position	Material	Notes	Images
Steneosaurus	cf. S. sp.	Beňatina	One isolated tooth	A Teleosaurid	

== See also ==
- List of fossiliferous stratigraphic units in Poland
- List of fossiliferous stratigraphic units in Slovakia
- Toarcian turnover
- Toarcian formations
  - Marne di Monte Serrone, Italy
  - Calcare di Sogno, Italy
  - Mizur Formation, North Caucasus
  - Sachrang Formation, Austria
  - Saubach Formation, Austria
  - Úrkút Manganese Ore Formation, Hungary
  - Posidonia Shale, Lagerstätte in Germany
  - Ciechocinek Formation, Germany and Poland
  - Djupadal Formation, Central Skane
  - Lava Formation, Lithuania
  - Azilal Group, North Africa
  - Whitby Mudstone, England
  - Fernie Formation, Alberta and British Columbia
    - Poker Chip Shale
  - Whiteaves Formation, British Columbia
  - Navajo Sandstone, Utah
  - Los Molles Formation, Argentina
  - Mawson Formation, Antarctica
  - Kandreho Formation, Madagascar
  - Kota Formation, India
  - Cattamarra Coal Measures, Australia
