= Shemshak Group =

Geologic formation in Iran

- Stratigraphic range: Norian–Late Jurassic
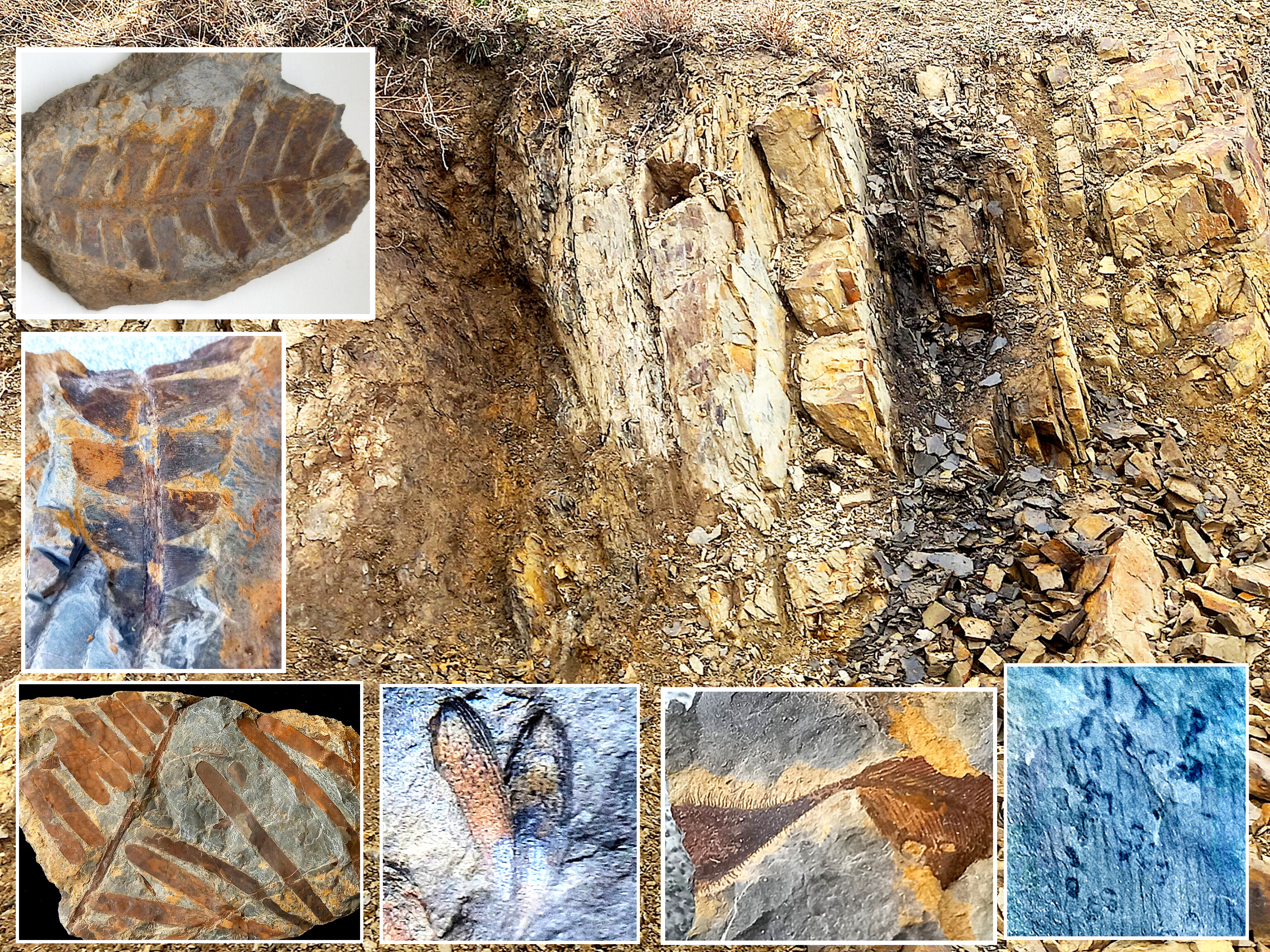
- A Shemshak Group excavation site and some of its fossils
- Type: Geological group
- Sub-units: Shemshak Formation; Dansirit Formation; Hojedk Formation; Nayband Formation; Klariz Formation; Badamu Formation
- Overlies: Elikah Formation; locally Permian or older rocks
- Thickness: Up to 4000 m

Lithology
- Primary: Mainly; Shale, sandstone; Mudrock
- Other: siltstone; Coal; argillite

Location
- Region: Alborz Province, Isfahan Province, Kerman Province, Golestan Province, South Khorasan Province
- Country: Iran
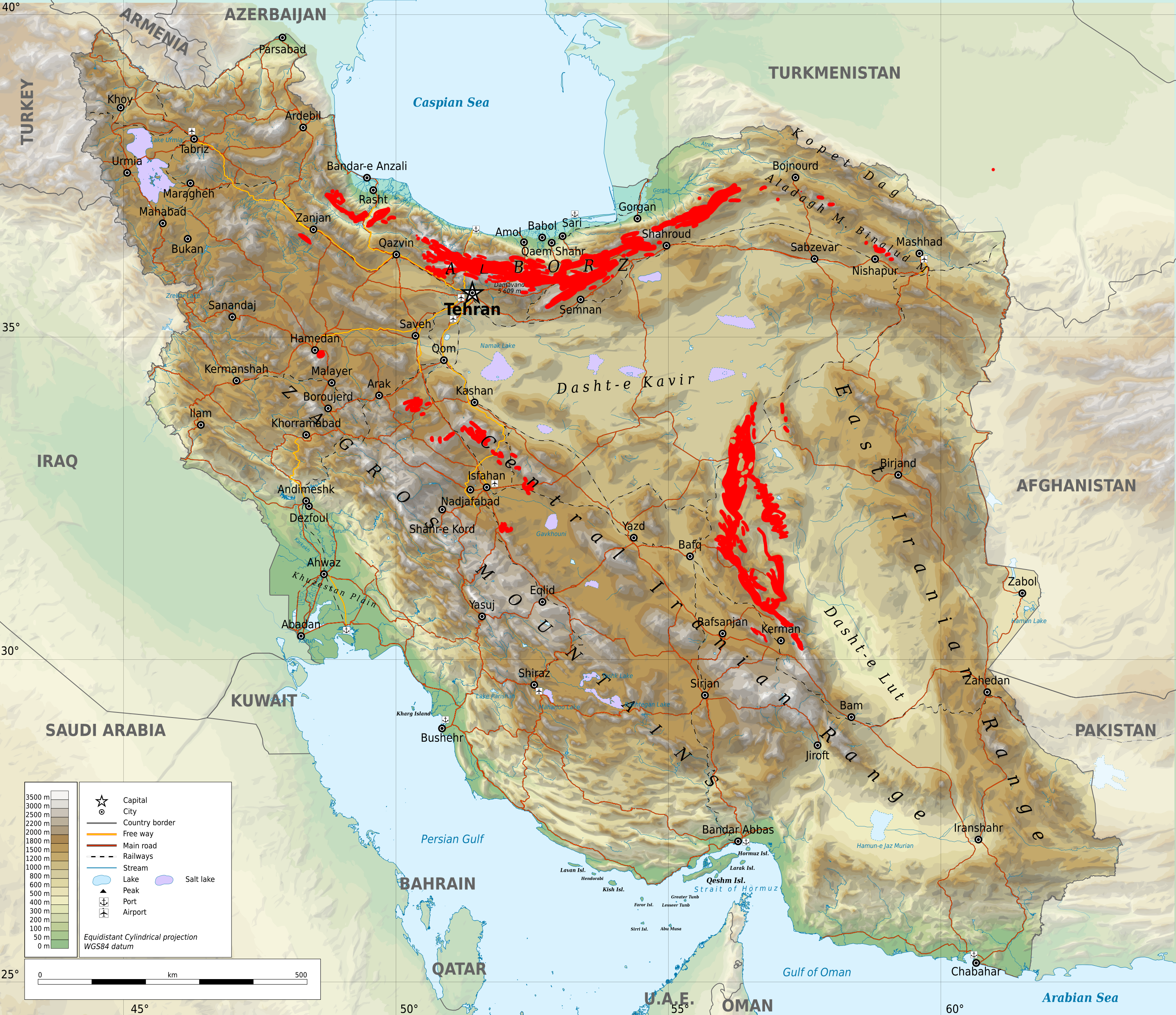
- The approximate extent of the Shemshak Group outcrops is marked in red (some locations are larger than reality).

The Shemshak Formation is a Mesozoic geologic group in Iran. It is dated to the Norian to the Late Jurassic and is up to 4,000 meters thick and primarily consists of siliciclastic sediments. The most important group in terms of paleontology is the Mesozoic in Iran. Contains dinosaur fossils, plant flora with rich coal deposits, and other animals.

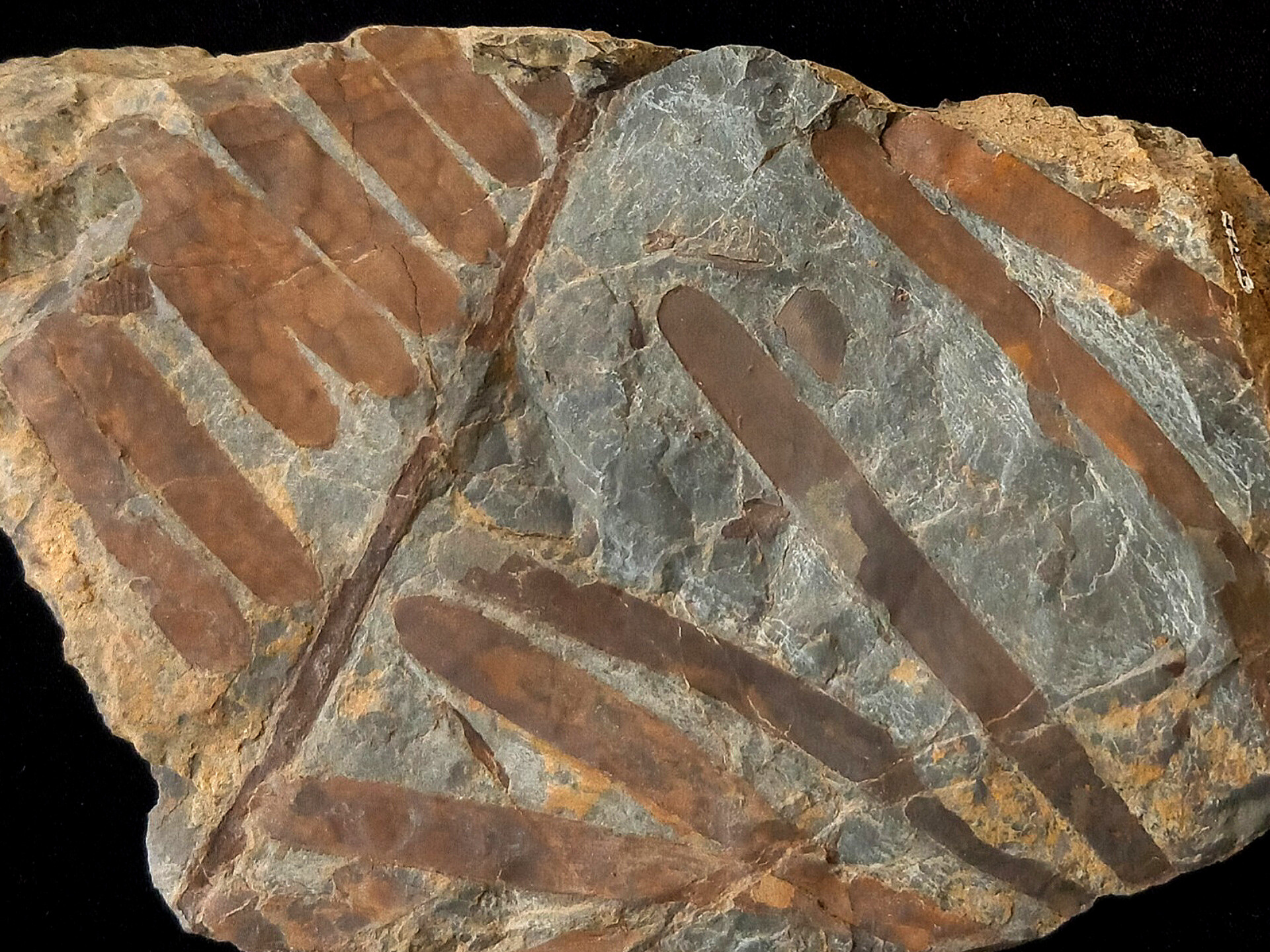
Zamites persica

== Fossils and paleoenvironment ==
The Shemshak Group in Iran includes formations that sometimes leave behind marine sediments. This section introduces all the fossil animals reported from this group.

Land animals:

=== Dinosaurs ===
- theropod, Fossil teeth and dozens of fossil footprints
- Sauropoda, Several fossil tracks
- Ornithopoda, Several fossil tracks
- Stegosauria, Several fossil tracks

=== Insects ===
- Cupedidae, Rhaetian, Alborz Province
- Roachoid, Rhaetian, Alborz Province
- Odonatan, Some eggs, Lower Jurassic, Gilan Province
- Xyelidae, Nutritional effects on leaves, Rhaetian, Alborz Province
- Large amounts of insect eggs and insect damage on leaves

=== plants ===
Plant fossils of the Shemshak Group mostly include Filicales, Bennettitales, Cycadales, Corystospermales, Caytoniales, Ginkgoales and Pinales. Filicophyta, Coniferales, Bennetitales and Equisetales dominate the flora, which indicates the deposition of this formation in relatively tropical and rainy environments in islands, deltas and river banks.

=== > cycads ===
- Nilssoniopteris, Rhaetian, Golestan Province
- Nilssonia, Middle Jurassic, Aalenian_Bajocian | Isfahan, South Khorasan
- Anomozamites, Rhaetian, Golestan Province
- Scytophyllum, Rhaetian, Golestan Province
- Ctenis, Aalenian_Bajocian | South Khorasan
- Pterophyllum
- Scytophyllum
- Taeniopteris
- Anthrophyopsis,Rhaetian, Golestan Province

=== > Bennettitales ===
- Zamites, Rhaetian, Golestan Province
- Pterophyllum, Rhaetian, Golestan Province
- Ptilophyllum, Aalenian_Bajocian | South Khorasan
- Otozamites, Rhaetian, Golestan Province
- Williamsonia, Rhaetian, Golestan Province

=== > Ferns ===
- Phlebopteris, Rhaetian, Aalenian_Bajocian | Golestan, South Khorasan
- Cladophlebis, Rhaetian, Middle Jurassic, Aalenian_Bajocian | Golestan, Isfahan, South Khorasan
- Clathropteris, Rhaetian, Golestan Province
- Lobifolia, Rhaetian, Golestan Province
- Dictyophyllum, Rhaetian, Aalenian_Bajocian | Golestan, South Khorasan
- Todites, Rhaetian, Aalenian_Bajocian | Golestan, South Khorasan
- Coniopteris, Middle Jurassic, Aalenian_Bajocian | Isfahan, South Khorasan
- Marattiopsis, Middle Jurassic, Aalenian_Bajocian | Isfahan, South Khorasan
- Ferizianopteris, Aalenian_Bajocian | South Khorasan
- Lobifolia, Aalenian_Bajocian | South Khorasan.

=== > Ginkgoopsida ===
- Ginkgoites, Middle Jurassic, Aalenian_Bajocian | Isfahan, South Khorasan
- Baier, Rhaetian, Golestan Province
- Stachyopitys, Rhaetian, Golestan Province
- Sphenobaiera, Middle Jurassic | Isfahan

=== > Conifers ===
- Podozamites, Rhaetian, Middle Jurassic, Aalenian_Bajocian | Golestan, Isfahan, South Khorasan
- Chamaetaxus, Rhaetian, Golestan Province
- Elatocladus, Middle Jurassic | Isfahan
- Elatides, Middle Jurassic, Aalenian_Bajocian | Isfahan, South Khorasan
- Cyparissidium, Middle Jurassic | Isfahan
- Klukia, Aalenian_Bajocian | South Khorasan

=== > Pteridospermatophyta ===
- Sphenopteris, Rhaetian, Aalenian_Bajocian | Golestan, South Khorasan
- Caytonanthus
- Pachypteris

=== > Equisetidae ===
- Equisetites, Rhaetian, Middle Jurassic, Aalenian_Bajocian | Golestan, Isfahan, South Khorasan
- Neocalamites, Rhaetian, Aalenian_Bajocian | Golestan, South Khorasan
- Annulariopsis, Middle Jurassic, Aalenian_Bajocian | Isfahan, South Khorasan
- beanii, Middle Jurassic | Isfahan

=== > Other plants ===
- Taeniopteris, Rhaetian, Middle Jurassic, Aalenian_Bajocian | Golestan, Isfahan, South Khorasan
- Chamaetaxus, Middle Jurassic | Isfahan
- Rhizomopteris, Aalenian_Bajocian | South Khorasan

=== Other animals ===
> Cephalopoda (ammonites, etc)

- Dactylioceras, Late Jurassic, Tehran Province
- Leioceras, Late Jurassic, Semnan Province

> Bivalvia:

- Inoperna, Late Jurassic, Semnan Province
- Pterotrigonia, Jurassic, North Khorasan Province
- Trigonia, Jurassic, North Khorasan Province

> Brachiopod:

- juralina, Late Jurassic, Tehran Province

== Description and The way to form ==
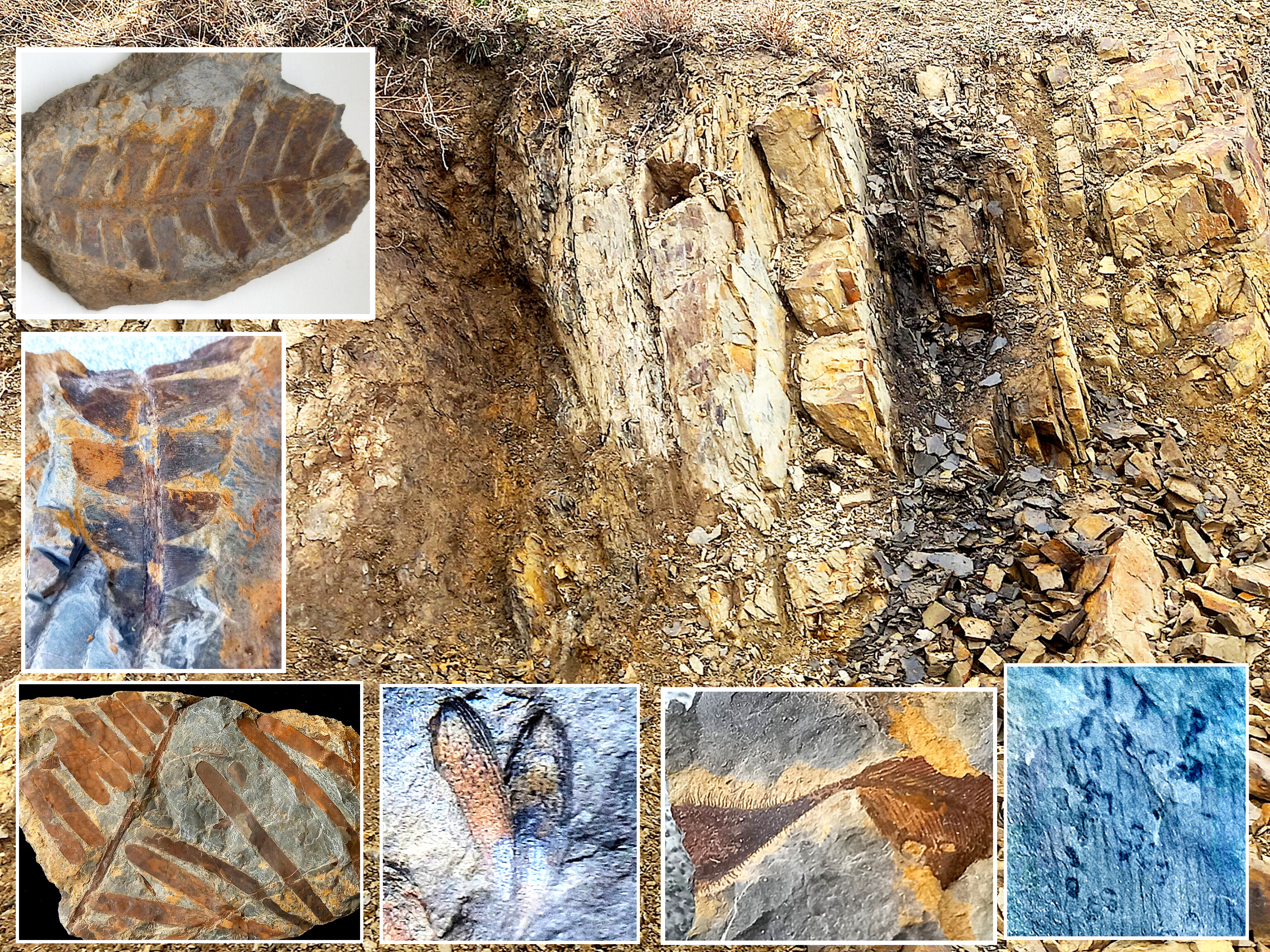
A Shemshak Group excavation site and some of its fossils

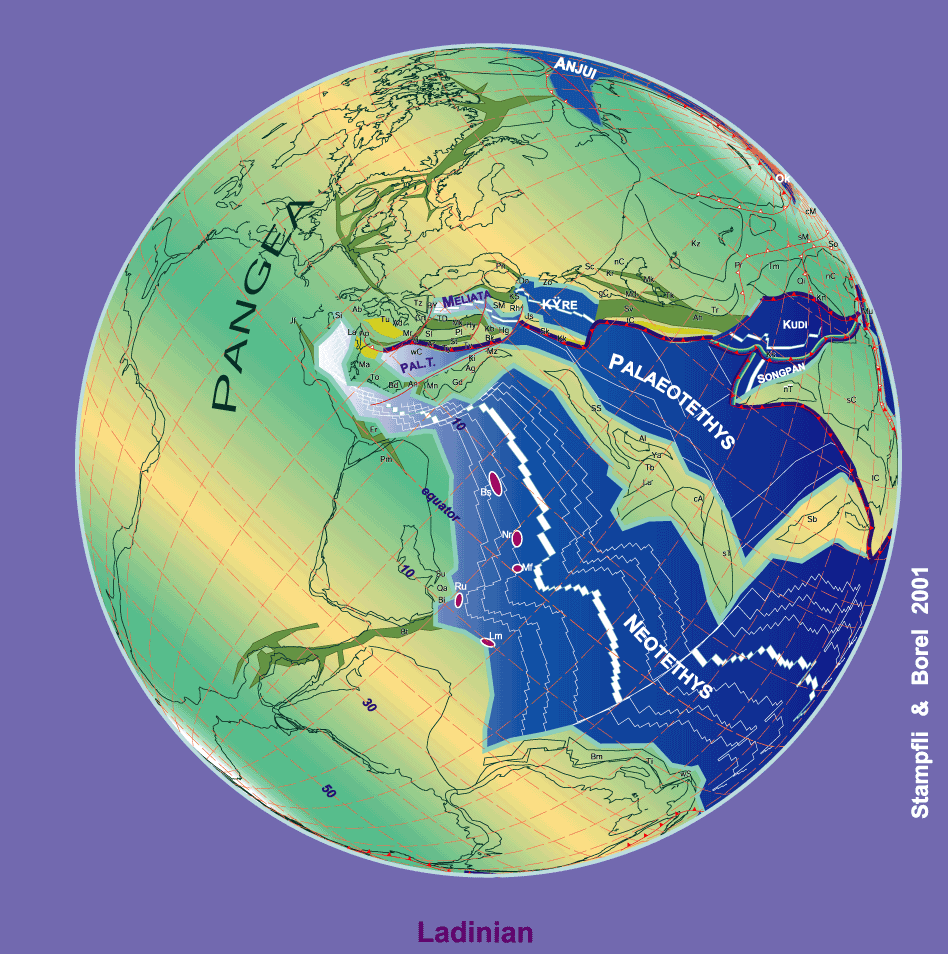
230 Ma plate tectonic reconstruction

In the Triassic, Iran changed the conditions and type of sedimentary basins of that time as a result of the tectonic forces of a large orogeny called Late Cimmerian. As a result of the tectonic forces, the young Tethys sea is opening and the Iran plate has been moving away from the Zagros-Arabian plate, and this movement towards the north caused the collision of the Iran and Turan plates and the closure of the old Tethys in the Late Triassic. Orogeny has been associated with the general upliftment of the earth, which until the middle of the Middle Jurassic, that is, about 170 million years ago, formed high landmasses in central Iran and Lut block

In Alborz, Farabums were associated with a lot of drift and the landing and residuals of the sea were accompanied, but in the late Triassic, with the advancement of the sea in Alborz, this area has become a relatively narrow bay that extends to the east and is connected to the high sea from the west. In this bay, the subsidence of the bed was high, so that the conditions for the accumulation of a significant amount of mud were fully provided. At this time, with the retreat of the sea, Alborz first became an alluvial-delta plain and then an alluvial plain in which turbine lagoons were sometimes formed. Due to these geographical and climatic conditions at that time, relatively homogeneous shale and sandstone deposits along with coal layers begin to form in these swampy-kulabi environments, which continue to the Middle Jurassic, about 170 million years ago. This uniformity in sedimentation in the late Triassic to Middle Jurassic is such that it is not possible to separate them based on age and in many parts of Alborz are not separated from each other.

1027 meters have been measured in the cutting site of the Setb pattern for the Shamshak formation, but the lateral thickness changes are very large in Alborz places and extend up to about 4000 meters.

The Shamshak Group is actually a sedimentary cycle whose deposits indicate the existence of wide plains and marsh-river basins and sometimes shallow seas. This stratified rock unit is one of the most prominent stratified rock units of Iran, which generally has a weathered appearance and dark color. Having a lot of coal, animal and plant fossils has caused many studies to be done on it. In the cutting site of this formation model that Aserto has chosen in the upstream of Rote valley in the north of Lazim pass, he has divided the Shamshak formation into four rock zones:

- ower sandstone: 70 to 100 meters thick, including an interval of whitish quartz sandstones with thin layers of shale and coaly shales.
- Lower Coal series: including 250 to 300 meters of shale and argillite with intervals of extractable coal
- Upper sandstone: 500 to 600 meters of overlying sandstones with mica silt layers and regionally shale and ammonite limestone horizons
- Upper coal series: argillaceous deposits and coal layers, where coal is abundant in the lower part and silt, marl and gray shale are more abundant in the upper part.

== Naming and age ==
In 1963, a scientist named Asreto studied this sedimentary row and called the Alborz coal-fired sediment collection "Sheshmak Formation" and considered its age from the early Jurassic (Lias) to the middle of it (Duger), but subsequent findings showed that the Shemshak Formation is actually It is a sedimentary shrub that can consist of several formations and its age ranges from the Late Triassic to the Late Jurassic, so the name "Sheshshak Group" was chosen for it.

== Formations ==
- Dansirit Formation
- Klariz Formation
- Nayband Formation
- Shemshak Formation
- Badamu Formation
- Hojedk Formation

== See also ==
- List of dinosaur-bearing rock formations
- Geology of Iran
  - List of stratigraphic units with theropod tracks
