= Dansirit Formation =

Geologic formation in Iran

- Stratigraphic range: Aalenian-Bajocian; ~175–165 Ma
- Type: Geological formation
- Unit of: Shemshak Group
- Underlies: Dalichai Formation
- Overlies: Fillzamin & Shirindasht Formations
- Thickness: over 200 metres (660 ft)

Lithology
- Primary: Sandstone
- Other: Shale, siltstone, Coal

Location
- Coordinates: 36.2°N 51.7°E
- Approximate paleocoordinates: 29.1°N 59.8°E
- Region: Mazandaran
- Country: Iran
- Extent: Alborz Mountains
- Dansirit Formation (Iran)

The Dansirit Formation is a geological formation in Iran. It is Middle Jurassic in age, dating from the Aalenian to Bajocian.

== Fossils ==
The fossils of Dansirit Formation mainly include plant fossils and dinosaur footprints

Plant fossils

Plant fossils of the Dansirit Formation mostly include Filicales, Bennettitales, Cycadales, Corystospermales, Caytoniales, Czekanowskiales, Ginkgoales and Pinales. Filicophyta, Coniferales, Bennetitales and Equisetales dominate the flora, which indicates the deposition of this formation in relatively tropical and rainy environments in islands, deltas and river banks.

Dinosaur footprints

The dinosaur footprints of this formation in Mazandaran province include theropods with an average length of about 2 meters, small two-toed Deinonychosaurs, relatively giant sauropods about 9 meters long, and small two-legged ornithopods. These works are limited to footprints and dinosaur fossils have not been reported in this formation.

== Description ==
It is part of the Shemshak Group, a Late Triassic to Callovian set of coal bearing largely fluvio-lacustrine sediments up to 4000 metres thick located within the Alborz Mountains. The outcrop of sediments is strongly controlled by numerous fault structures in the region. The formation predominantly consists of sandstone, with subordinate siltstone and shale. Dinosaur tracks are known from the formation, including sauropods, and tridactyl and didactyl theropods. A diverse fossil flora is also known from the formation. After this formation, the Garedu Red Bed Formation contains the most numerous dinosaur fossils in Iran.

== See also ==
Shemshak Group
