= Ludwigia =

Ludwigia is the generic name of three groups of organisms. It can refer to:

- Animals
  - Ludwigia (ammonite)
  - Ludwigia (beetle) (an invalid name, now Neoludwigia)
- Plants
  - Ludwigia (plant)
