= Dimorphinites =

Dimorphinites Temporal range: Bajocian

Scientific classification
- Kingdom: Animalia
- Phylum: Mollusca
- Class: Cephalopoda
- Subclass: †Ammonoidea
- Order: †Ammonitida
- Family: †Morphoceratidae
- Genus: †Dimorphinites; Buckman, 1923

Dimorphinites is an extinct genus from a well-known class of fossil cephalopods, the ammonites, which lived during the Bajocian.
