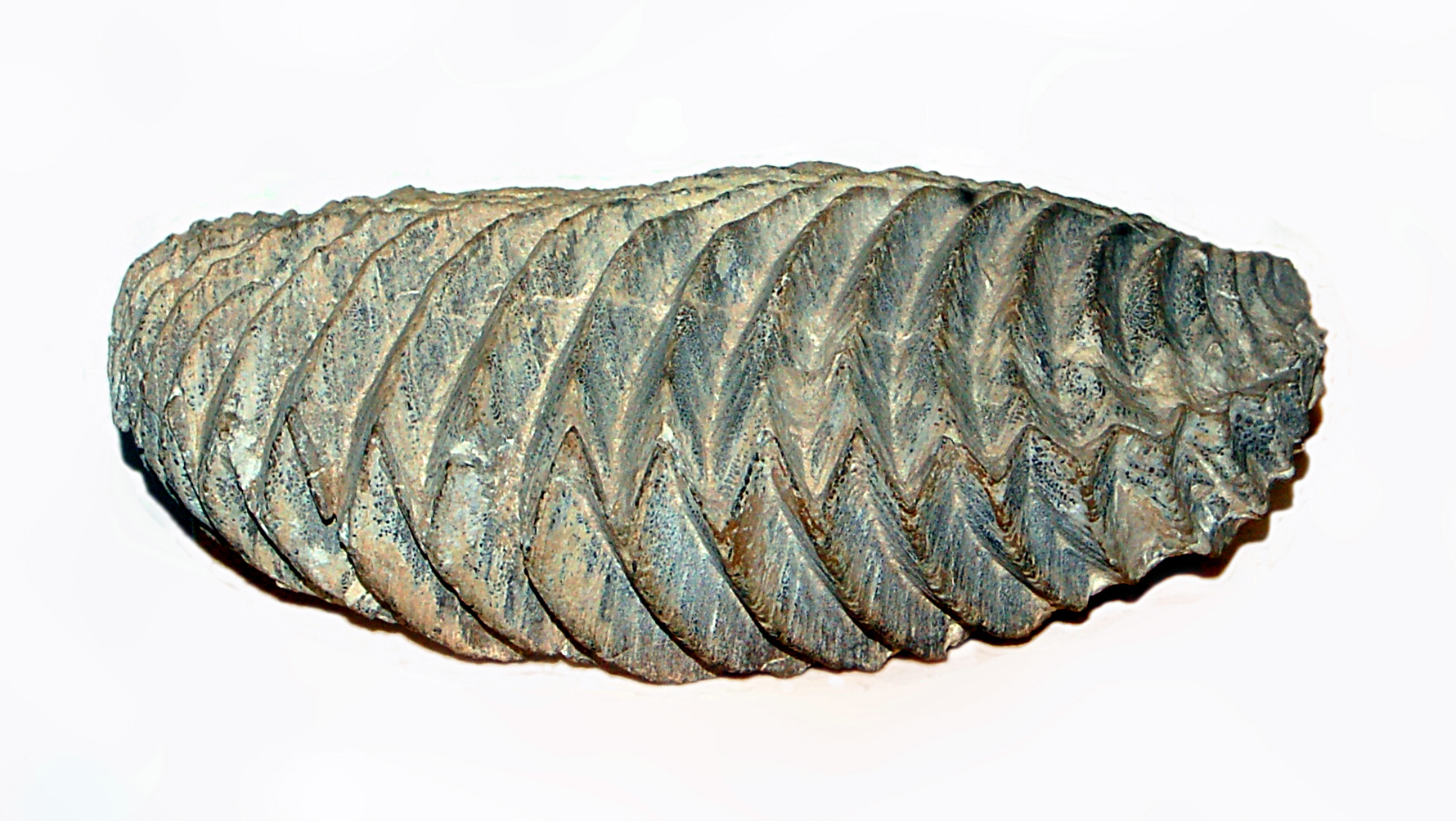
- Fossil Lopha sp. from Upper Cretaceous, France

Scientific classification
- Domain: Eukaryota
- Kingdom: Animalia
- Phylum: Mollusca
- Class: Bivalvia
- Order: Ostreida
- Family: Ostreidae
- Subfamily: Ostreinae
- Genus: Lopha; Röding, 1798

Synonyms
- Alectryonia Fischer von Waldheim, 1807

= Lopha =

Lopha Temporal range: Triassic - Recent

Genus of bivalves

Lopha is a genus of marine bivalve molluscs in the family of Ostreidae.

The genus Lopha is present from the Triassic period in the Lower Norian age (216.5 ± 2.0 – 203.6 ± 1.5 Mya) to the recent age.

== Description ==
Lopha species have thick, strongly ribbed shells with unequal valves. The margins of the valves have a characteristic zig-zag pattern. The lower valve shows finger-like outgrowths, by which the molluscs adhere to the substrate. These molluscs are stationary, epifaunal, suspension feeders, as they feed by filtering sea water to extract the nutrients.

== Species ==
- Lopha affinis Sowerby, 1871
- Lopha capsa Fischer von Waldheim, 1808
- Lopha chemnitzii Hanley, 1846
- Lopha cristagalli C. Linnaeus, 1758
- Lopha frons C. Linnaeus, 1758
- Lopha imbricata J. B. Lamarck, 1819
- Lopha rosacea G. P. Deshayes, 1836

== Fossil species ==
- Lopha gregarea, Oxfordian (stage) (160 mya)
- Lopha marshii (Sowerby, 1914), Bajocian (170 mya)

== Gallery ==
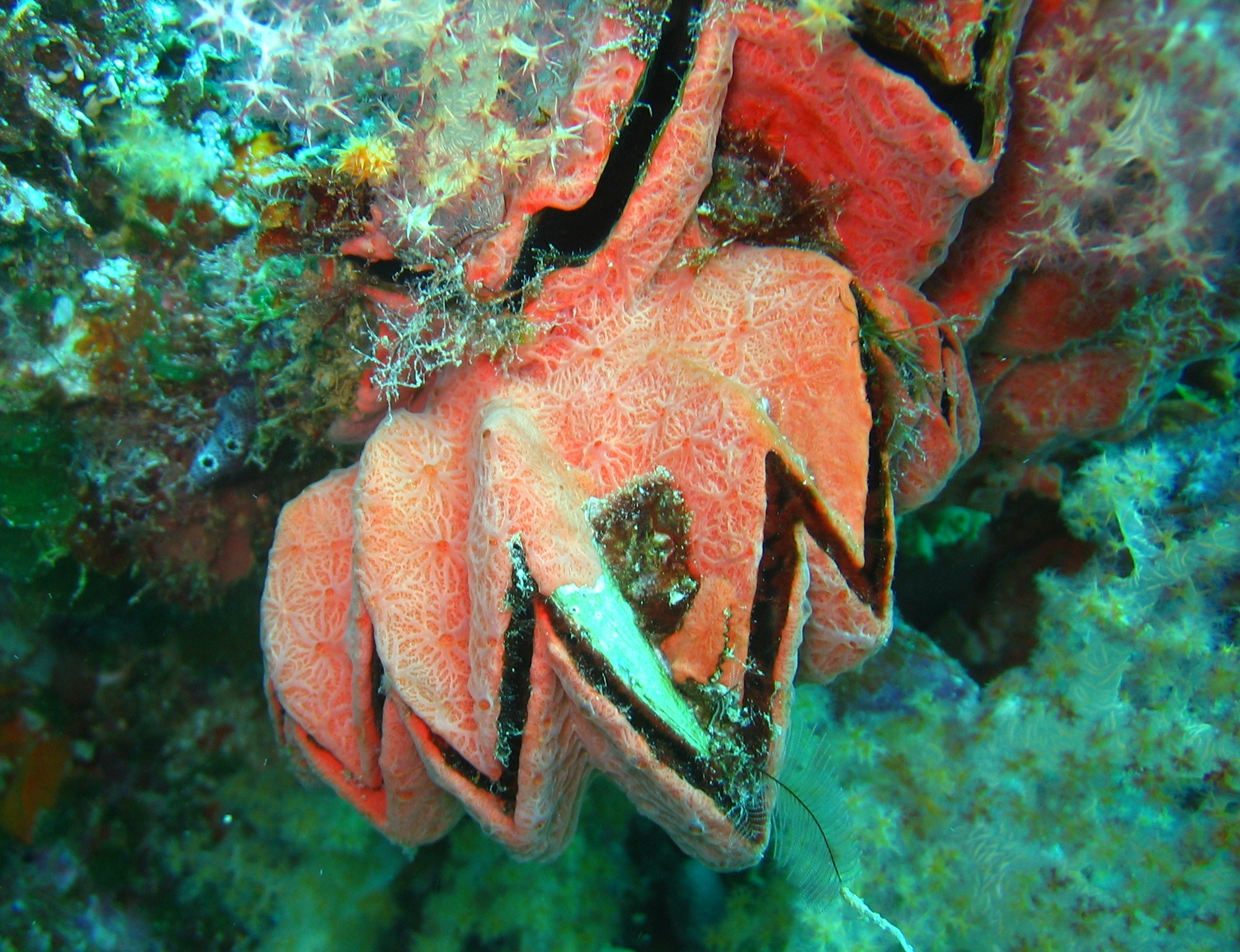
Lopha cristagalli

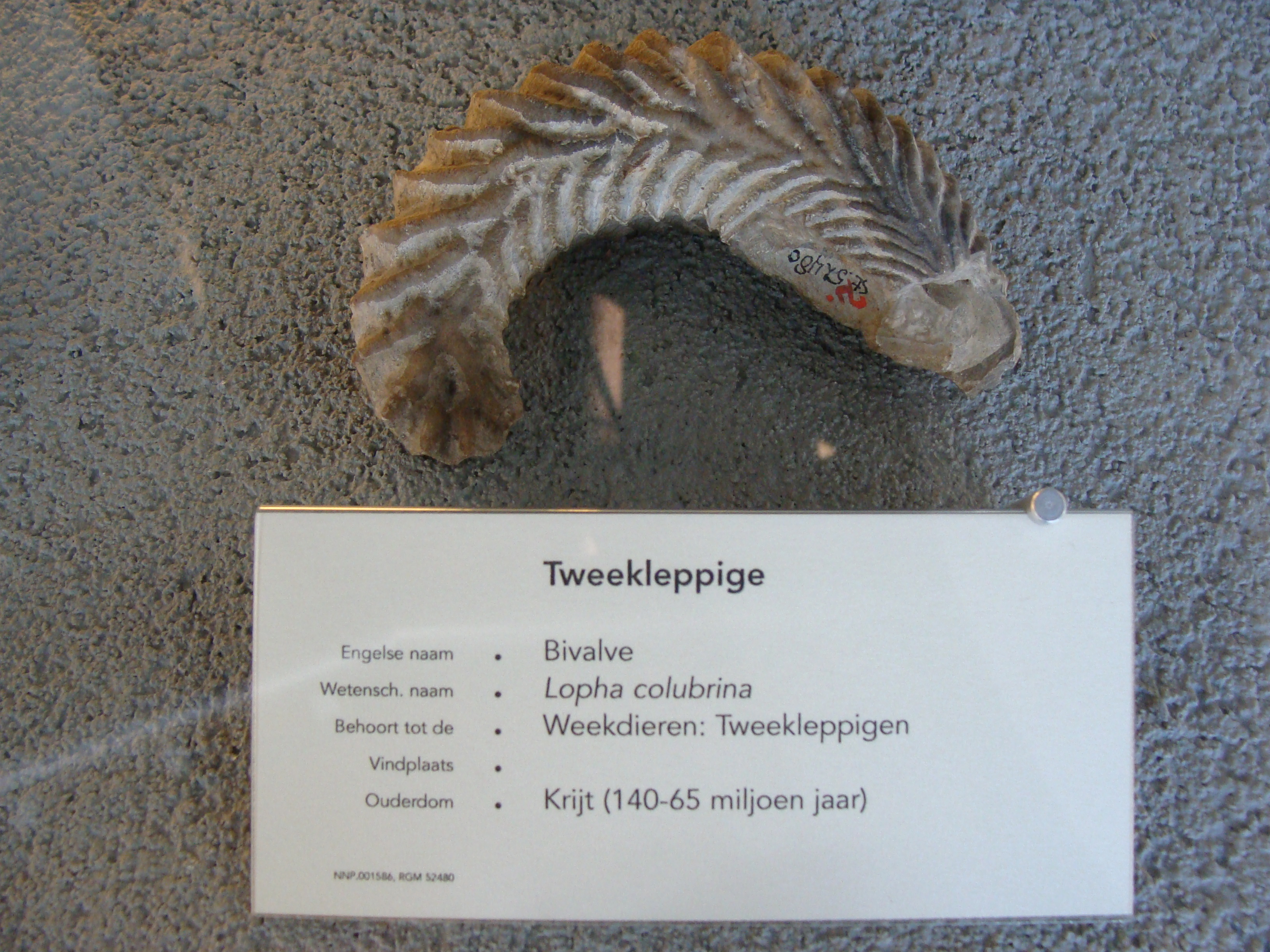
Lopha colubrina in Naturalis, Leiden
