= Lupherites =

Lupherites Temporal range: Bajocian

Scientific classification
- Kingdom: Animalia
- Phylum: Mollusca
- Class: Cephalopoda
- Subclass: †Ammonoidea
- Genus: †Lupherites

Lupherites is an extinct genus from a well-known class of fossil cephalopods, the ammonites. It lived during the Bajocian, which lasted from approximately 170.3 to 168.3 million years ago.
