= Rhynchonelloidea (Aalenirhynchia) =

Rhynchonelloidea (Aalenirhynchia) Temporal range: 175.6–171.6 Ma Aalenian

Scientific classification
- Kingdom: Animalia
- Phylum: Brachiopoda
- Class: Rhynchonellata
- Order: Rhynchonellida
- Family: †Rhynchonellidae
- Genus: †Rhynchonelloidea
- Subgenus: †Aalenirhynchia; Shi and Grant, 1993

Species
- A. subdecorata A. walkeri

Extinct subgenus of marine lamp shells

Aalenirhynchia is an extinct subgenus of brachiopods found in Aalenian strata in Gloucestershire, England. It was a stationary epifaunal suspension feeder. Originally classed as a genus, it was reclassified as a subgenus of Rhynchonelloidea by Williams et al. in 2002.
