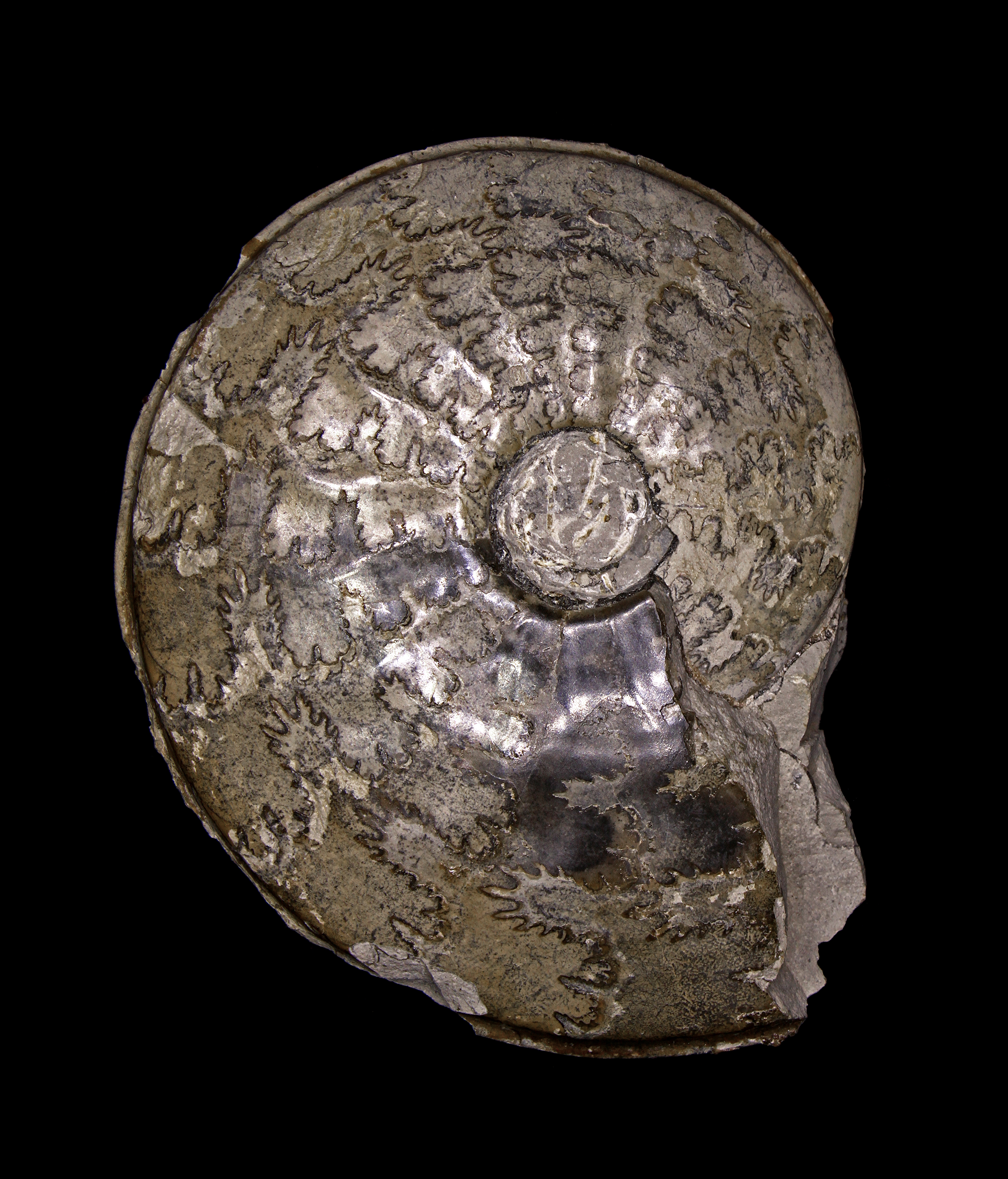

Scientific classification
- Kingdom: Animalia
- Phylum: Mollusca
- Class: Cephalopoda
- Subclass: †Ammonoidea
- Order: †Ammonitida
- Family: †Graphoceratidae
- Subfamily: †Graphoceratinae
- Genus: †Hyperlioceras; Buchman, 1889

Species
- Hyperlioceras (Toxolioceras) incisum; Hyperlioceras (Toxolioceras) inclusum; Hyperlioceras curvicostatum

= Hyperlioceras =

Hyperlioceras Temporal range: Bajocian

Genus of molluscs (fossil)

Hyperlioceras is an extinct genus of cephalopod included in the ammonitid family Graphoceratidae that lived during the Bajocian stage of the Middle Jurassic. The type species is Hyperlioceras discites (Waagen, 18567)

== Morphology ==
The shell of Hyperlioceras is very compressed and involute, with a tall persistent keel and a deep umbilicus.

== Biostratigraphic significance ==
The International Commission on Stratigraphy (ICS) has defined the base of the Bajocian Stage of the Jurassic as the lowest occurrence of the genus Hyperlioceras, at 170.3 ± 1.4 million years ago, which defines base of the Hyperlioceras discites Zone. This point also marks the end of the preceding Aalenian Stage. The upper boundary of the Bajocian is indicated by the lowest occurrence of the ammonite Parkinsonia (G.) convergens, at about 167.7 Ma, which defines base of Zigzagiceras zigzag Zone.

== Distribution ==
Luxembourg, Saudi Arabia, Spain and the United Kingdom.

== Synonyms ==
- Braunsella Buckman, 1904
- Braunsina Buckman, 1902
- Darellia
- Darellina Buckman, 1904
- Deltoidoceras Buckman, 1902
- Deltotoceras Buckman, 1904
- Dissoroceras Buckman, 1902
- Hugia Buckman, 1904
- Hyperlioceras (Toxolioceras)
- Lopadoceras Buckman, 1904
- Reynesella
- Reynesia Buckman, 1902
- Toxolioceras
