= Eocephalites =

Eocephalites Temporal range: Bajocian

Scientific classification
- Kingdom: Animalia
- Phylum: Mollusca
- Class: Cephalopoda
- Subclass: †Ammonoidea
- Genus: †Eocephalites

Species
- Eocephalites primus Imlay 1967

Extinct genus of molluscs

Eocephalites is an extinct genus from a well-known class of fossil cephalopods; the ammonites. It lived during the Bajocian.
