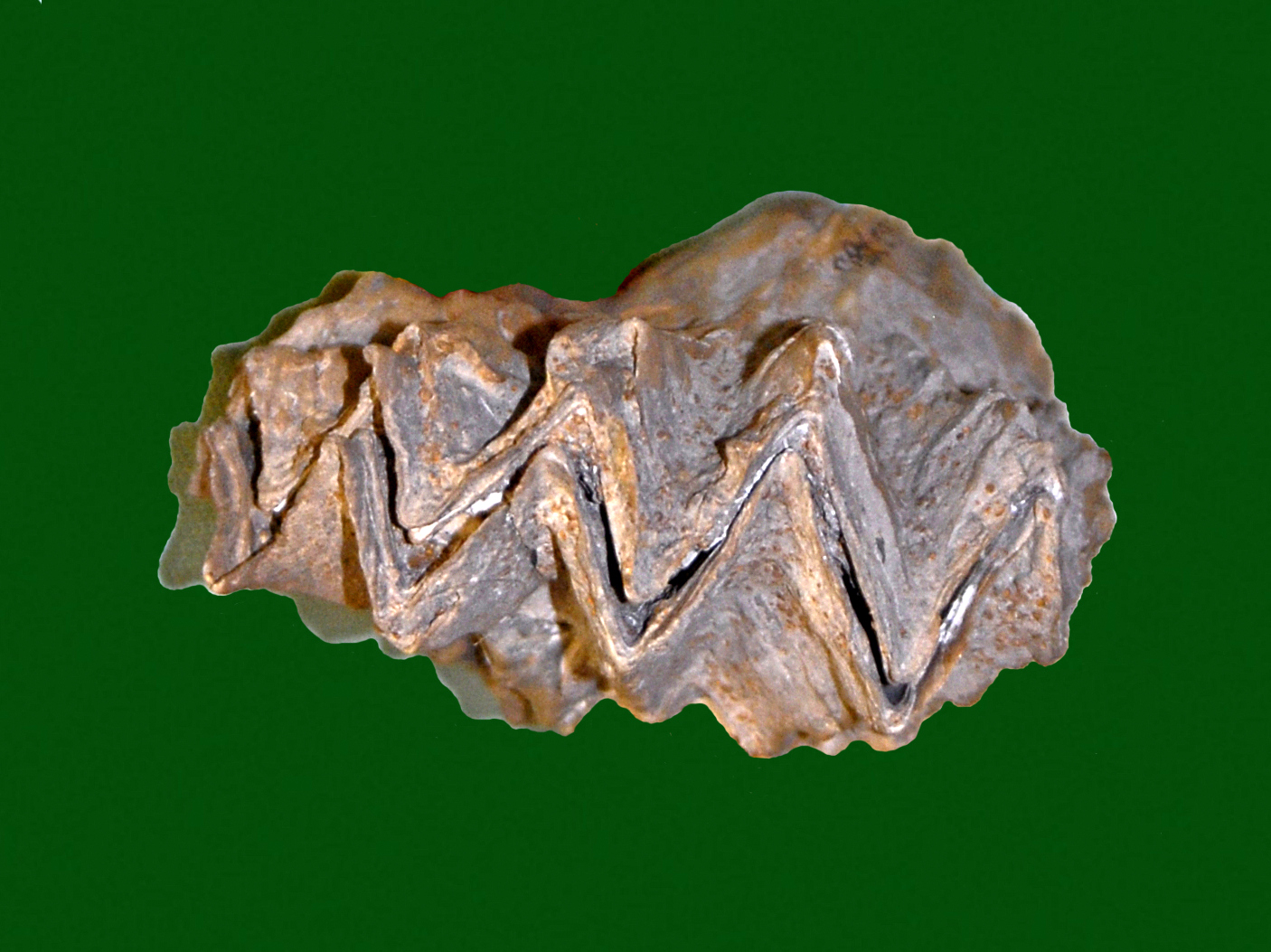
- Fossil Lopha marshii from Vaches Noires (Calvados) at Galerie de paléontologie et d'anatomie comparée, Paris

Scientific classification
- Domain: Eukaryota
- Kingdom: Animalia
- Phylum: Mollusca
- Class: Bivalvia
- Order: Ostreida
- Family: Ostreidae
- Genus: Lopha
- Species: L. marshii

Binomial name
- Lopha marshii (Sowerby, 1814)

= Lopha marshii =

Lopha marshii Temporal range: Bajocian, 170.3–168.3 Ma

Extinct species of bivalve

Lopha marshii is a fossil species of true oyster, a marine bivalve mollusc in the family Ostreidae, the true oysters. This species was present in the Bajocian age (about 170 mya).
