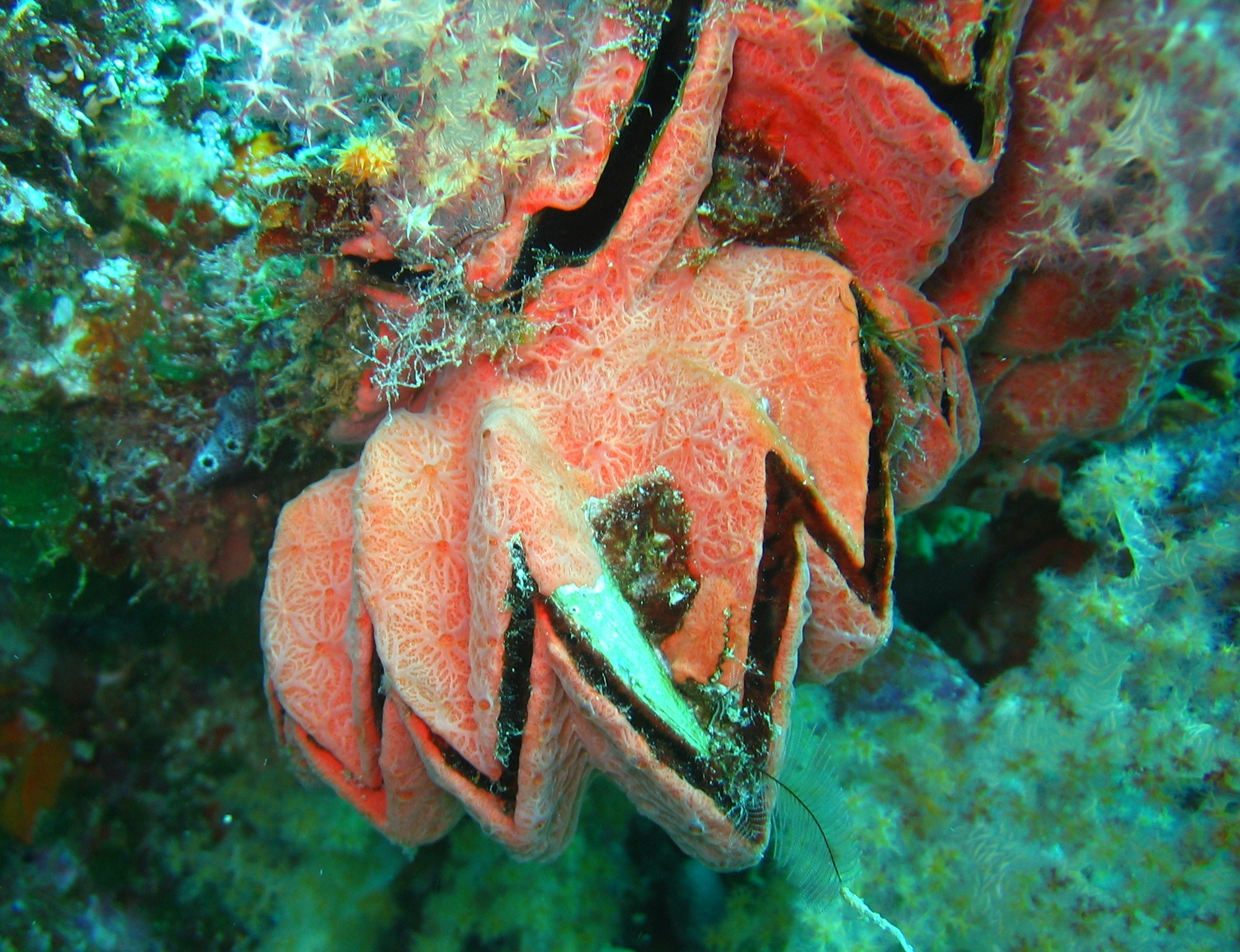
- Live specimen of Lopha cristagalli

Scientific classification
- Kingdom: Animalia
- Phylum: Mollusca
- Class: Bivalvia
- Order: Ostreida
- Family: Ostreidae
- Genus: Lopha
- Species: L. cristagalli

Binomial name
- Lopha cristagalli (Linnaeus, 1758)

Synonyms
- Alectryonia rara Fischer von Waldheim, 1807; Mytilus cristagalli Linnaeus, 1758; Ostrea cristagalli (Linnaeus, 1758); Ostrea townsendi Melvill, 1898

= Lopha cristagalli =

Species of mollusc

Lopha cristagalli, the cockscomb oyster, cock's-comb oyster, or coxcomb oyster, is a species of marine bivalve molluscs in the family Ostreidae.

== Description ==
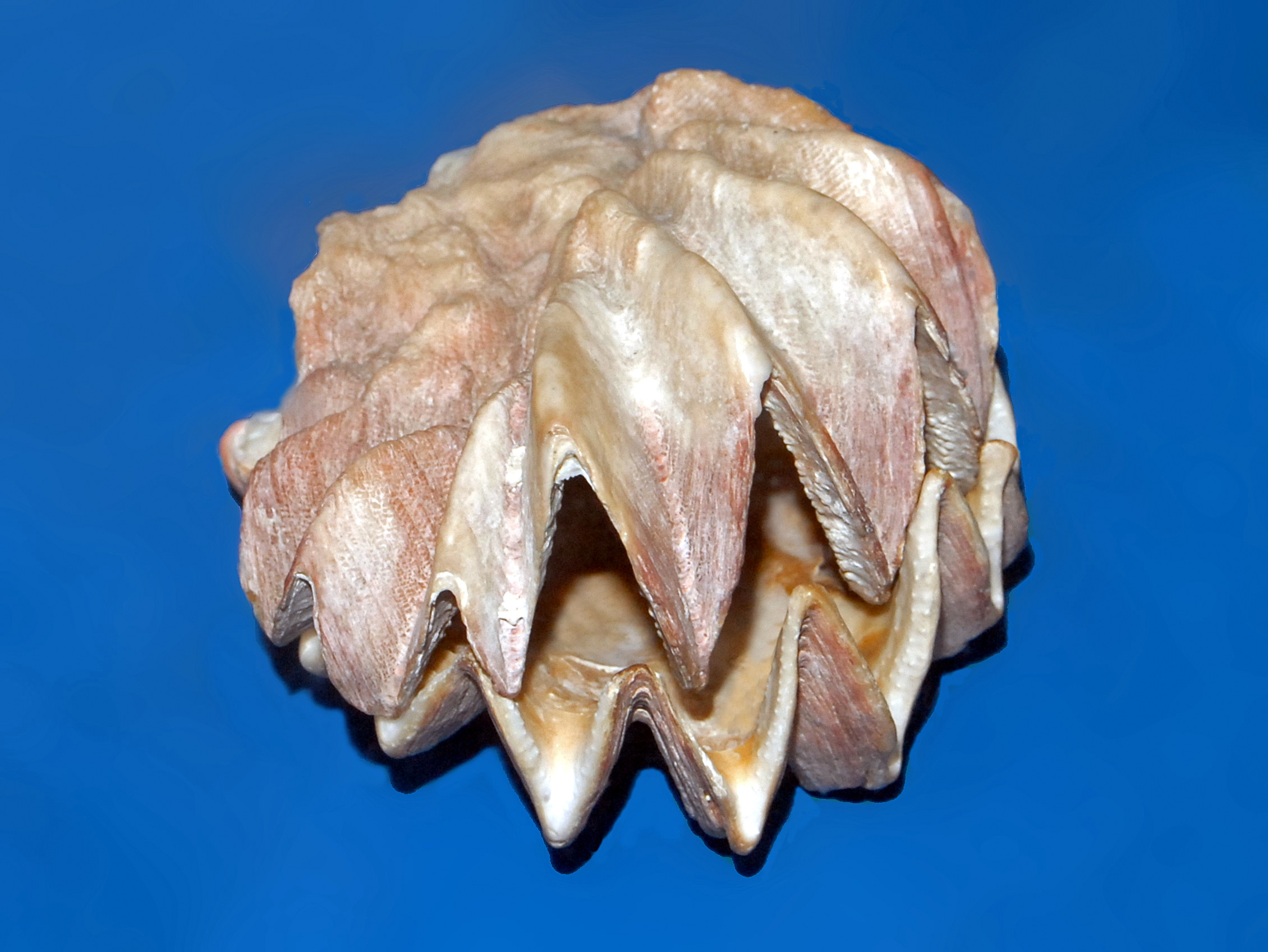
Shell of Lopha cristagalli from Okinawa at the Museo Civico di Storia Naturale di Milano

The cockscomb oyster has a shell reaching a maximum diameter of about 20.5 cm, commonly 10 cm. It has a variable coloration, dark to light purple, and it is a thick, strongly ribbed, and slightly inequivalve shell. The shell inside is porcelaneous, usually purplish-brown or whitish in colour. The margins of the valves have a characteristic zig-zag pattern. The surfaces of both valves have many small, low, and rounded protuberances. These molluscs are stationary epifaunal suspension feeders, as they feed filtering sea water to extract the nutrients.

== Distribution and habitat ==
This species is widespread in the Indo-West Pacific, from East Africa, including Madagascar, Mauritius, the Red Sea, Seychelles, and the Persian Gulf, to Micronesia; north to Japan and south to Papua New Guinea and Indonesia. It lives on coral reefs in shallow subtidal waters at depths of 5 to 30 m.
