= Garedu Red Bed Formation =

Geologic formation in Iran

- Stratigraphic range: Kimmeridgian–Tithonian
- Type: Geological Formation
- Overlies: Esfandiar Formation
- Thickness: 500m~

Lithology
- Primary: Mainly siliciclastic; Conglomerate, sandstone, Siltstone
- Other: Copper, Uranium, Hematite,

Location
- Coordinates: Tabas Block, Kerman Province and South Khorasan Province
- Country: Iran

Garedu Red Bed is a geological formation in central Iran (Tabas Block) mainly continental with arid to semi-arid climate, This formation was deposited gradually or discontinuously on the limestone of the Esfandiar Formation. The age of these sediments is attributed to the Upper Jurassic, Kimmeridgian–Tithonian, although its upper layers may have been deposited in the Early Cretaceous, as biostratigraphic data are not sufficiently assignable. In between, there are layers containing copper occurrences that are associated with plant remains.
