= Graphoceras =

Graphoceras Temporal range: Aalenian–Bajocian

Scientific classification
- Kingdom: Animalia
- Phylum: Mollusca
- Class: Cephalopoda
- Subclass: †Ammonoidea
- Order: †Ammonitida
- Family: †Graphoceratidae
- Subfamily: †Graphoceratinae
- Genus: †Graphoceras; Buckman, 1898

Genus of molluscs (fossil)

Graphoceras is an extinct ammonite genus included in the hildoceratacean family Graphoceratidae that lived during the Aalenian and Bajocian stages, Middle Jurassic in what is now Europe, north Africa, and Iran.

Graphoceras produced a compressed, involute shell with a raised umbilical edge and sinuous ribbing.
