= Toarcian =

Fourth and last age of the Early Jurassic

- 184.2 ± 0.3 – 174.7 ± 0.8 Ma
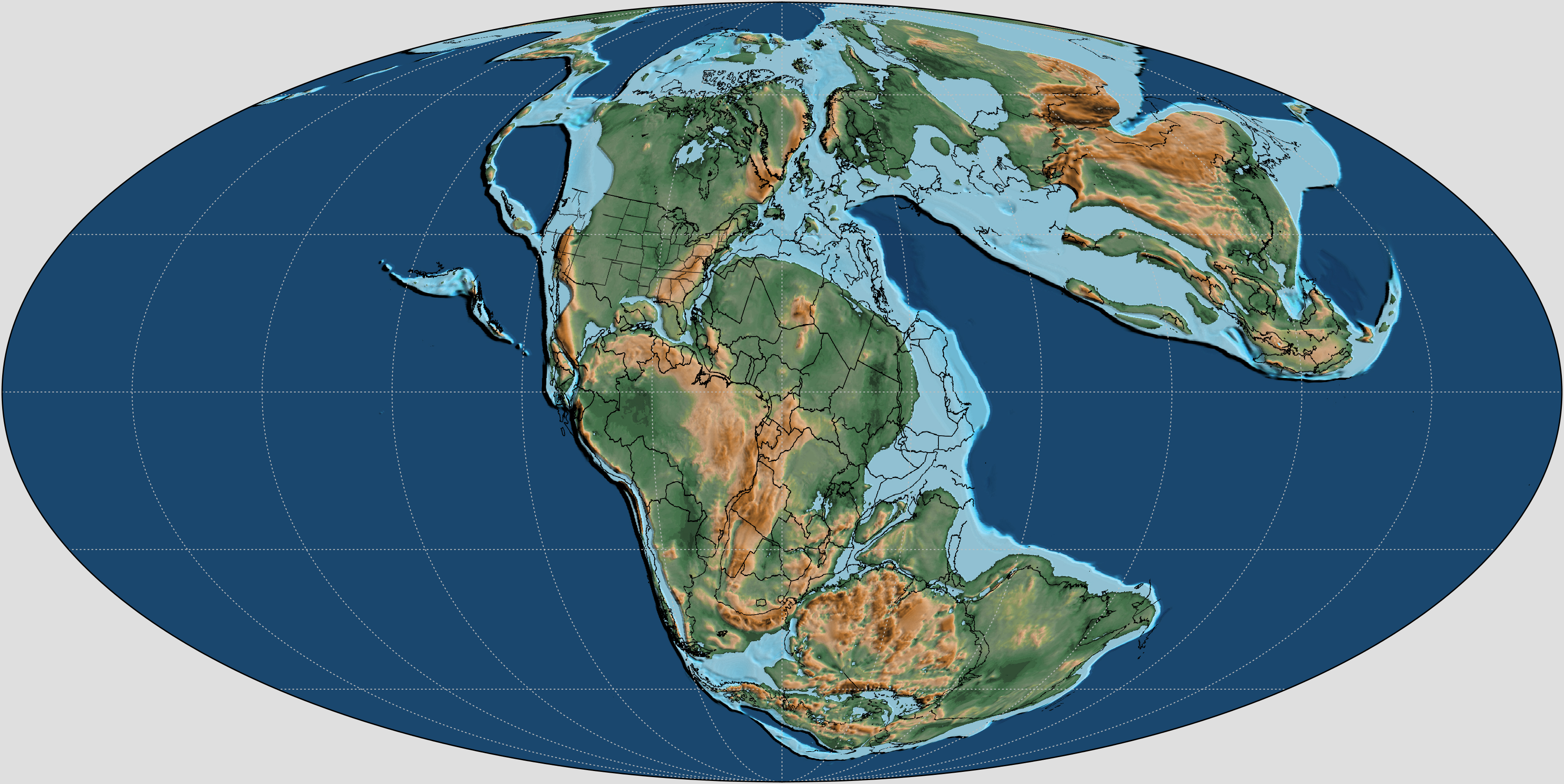
- Map of Earth at 180 million years ago; the boundaries of present-day landmasses, countries, and states are superimposed as black outlines

Chronology
← / Triassic–Jurassic extinction event
Subdivision of the Jurassic according to the ICS, as of 2024. Vertical axis scale: Millions of years ago

Etymology
- Name formality: Formal

Usage information
- Celestial body: Earth
- Regional usage: Global (ICS)
- Time scale(s) used: ICS Time Scale

Definition
- Chronological unit: Age
- Stratigraphic unit: Stage
- Time span formality: Formal
- Lower boundary definition: Peniche, Portugal
- Lower boundary GSSP: FAD of the Ammonite D. (E.) simplex 39.3708°N 9.3853°W
- Lower GSSP ratified: 2014
- Upper boundary definition: FAD of the Ammonites Leioceras opalinum and Leioceras lineatum
- Upper boundary GSSP: Fuentelsaz, Spain; 41.1708°N 1.8333°W
- Upper GSSP ratified: 2000

The Toarcian is, in the ICS' geologic timescale, an age and stage in the Early or Lower Jurassic. It spans the time between 184.2 Ma (million years ago) and 174.7 ±0.8 Ma. It follows the Pliensbachian and is followed by the Aalenian.

The Toarcian Age began with the Toarcian Oceanic Anoxic Event, a major anoxic event associated with marine extinctions and increased global temperatures that sets its fossil faunas apart from the previous Pliensbachian age. It is believed to have ended with a global cooling event known as the Comptum Cooling Event, although whether it represented a worldwide event is controversial.

== Stratigraphic definitions ==
The Toarcian takes its name from the city of Thouars, just south of Saumur in the Loire Valley of France. The stage was introduced by French palaeontologist Alcide d'Orbigny in 1842, after examining rock strata of this age in a quarry near Thouars.

In Europe this period is represented by the upper part of the Lias.

The base of the Toarcian is defined as the place in the stratigraphic record where the ammonite genus Eodactylites first appears. A global reference profile (a GSSP) for the base is located at Peniche, Portugal. The top of the stage is at the first appearance of ammonite genus Leioceras.

In the Tethys domain, the Toarcian contains the following ammonite biozones:

- zone of Pleydellia aalensis
- zone of Dumortieria pseudoradiosa
- zone of Phlyseogrammoceras dispansum
- zone of Grammoceras thouarcense
- zone of Haugia variabilis
- zone of Hildoceras bifrons
- zone of Harpoceras serpentinum
- zone of Dactylioceras tenuicostatum

== Sources ==
- Gradstein, F.M.; Ogg, J.G. & Smith, A.G.; 2004: A Geologic Time Scale 2004, Cambridge University Press.
- d´Orbigny, A.C.V.M.D.; 1842: Paléontologie française. 1. Terrains oolitiques ou jurassiques, Bertrand, Paris. (in French)
- Elmi, S., Rulleau, L., Gabilly, J. & Mouterde, R. 1997: Toarcien. In: Cariou, E. & Hantzpergue, P. (eds): Biostratigraphie du Jurassique ouest-européen et méditerranéen. Bulletin du Centre des Recherches, Elf Explor. Prod. Mém., 17.
