= Ancolioceras =

Ancolioceras Temporal range: Aalenian

Scientific classification
- Kingdom: Animalia
- Phylum: Mollusca
- Class: Cephalopoda
- Subclass: †Ammonoidea
- Order: †Ammonitida
- Family: †Graphoceratidae
- Subfamily: †Leioceratinae
- Genus: †Ancolioceras; Buckman, 1899

Genus of molluscs (fossil)

Ancolioceras is an extinct genus of cephalopod belonging to the ammonite subclass.
