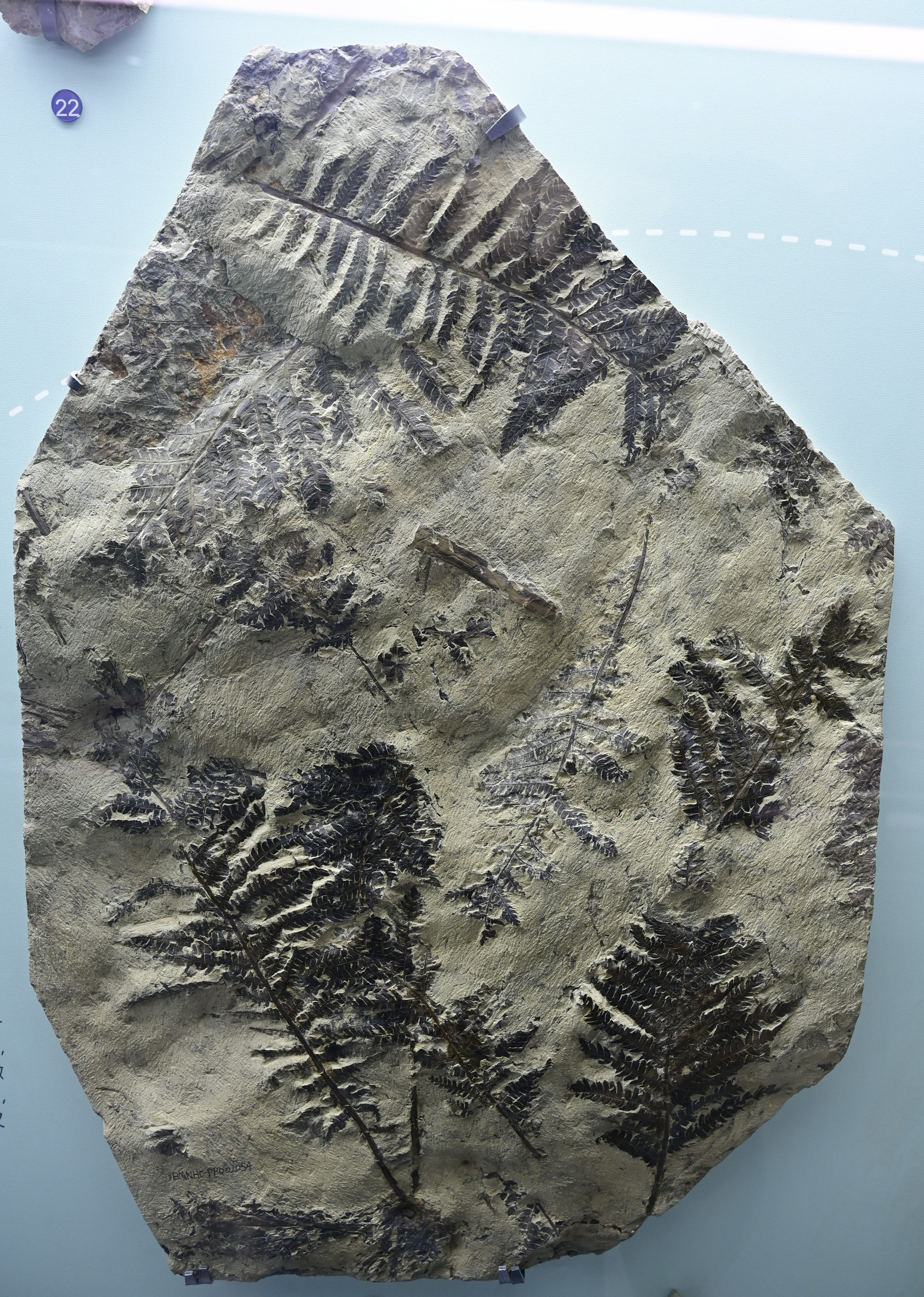
- Fossil specimen, National Natural History Museum of China
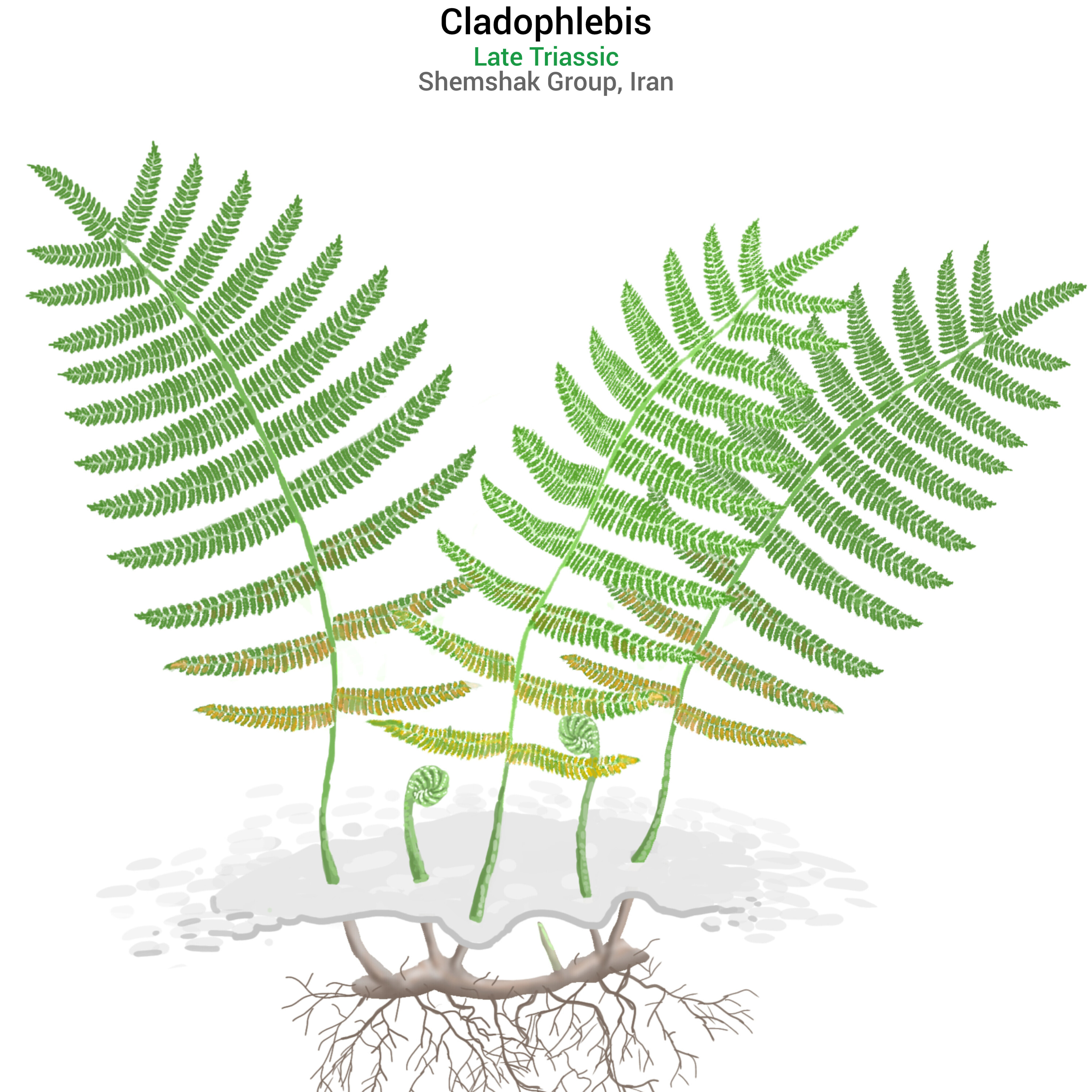
- Life restoration of Cladophlebis sp. from Shemshak Group

Scientific classification
- Kingdom: Plantae
- Clade: Embryophytes
- Clade: Tracheophytes
- Division: Polypodiophyta
- Class: Polypodiopsida
- Order: Osmundales
- Family: Osmundaceae
- Genus: †Cladophlebis; Brongn.

Species
- See text

= Cladophlebis =

Cladophlebis Temporal range: Permian to Campanian ~279–70 Ma

Extinct genus of ferns

Cladophlebis is an extinct form genus of fern, which has been reported from the Permian to the end of the Cretaceous and from all continents of the world.

== Description ==
Some pinnules have smooth edges and some have serrated edges. The midrib is distinct and the lateral veins are dichotomous (two branches) to the end. This fern had rizoma. used to refer to Paleozoic and Mesozoic fern leaves that have "fern fronds with pinnules that are attached to the rachis, and have a median vein that runs to the apex of the pinnule, and veins from that are curved and dichotomise".

== Species ==
There were many species of Cladophlebis, including: C. akhtashensis, C. arctica, C. browniana, C. denticulata, C. dunberi, C. fukiensis. C. haiburnensis, C. heterophylla, C. hirta, C. impressa, C. kurtzi, C. lobifolia, C. nebbensis, C. patagonica, C. phlebopteris, C. porsildi, C. readi, C. remota, C. retallackii, C. roessertii, C. septentrionalis, C. simplicima, C. spectabilis, C. tenuis, C. wyomingensis, and C. yanschinii.
