= Klariz Formation =

Geologic formation in Iran

- Stratigraphic range: Norian–Rhaetian
- Type: Geological Formation

Lithology
- Primary: Mainly siliciclastic; Shale, sandstone, Mudrock
- Other: siltstone, Coal

Location
- Country: Iran

Klariz Formation is an Upper Triassic formation in the Alborz Mountains. It is composed of mixed carbonate-detrital silica deposits.
