= Aalenian =

First age of the Middle Jurassic

- 174.7 ± 0.8 – 170.9 ± 0.8 Ma
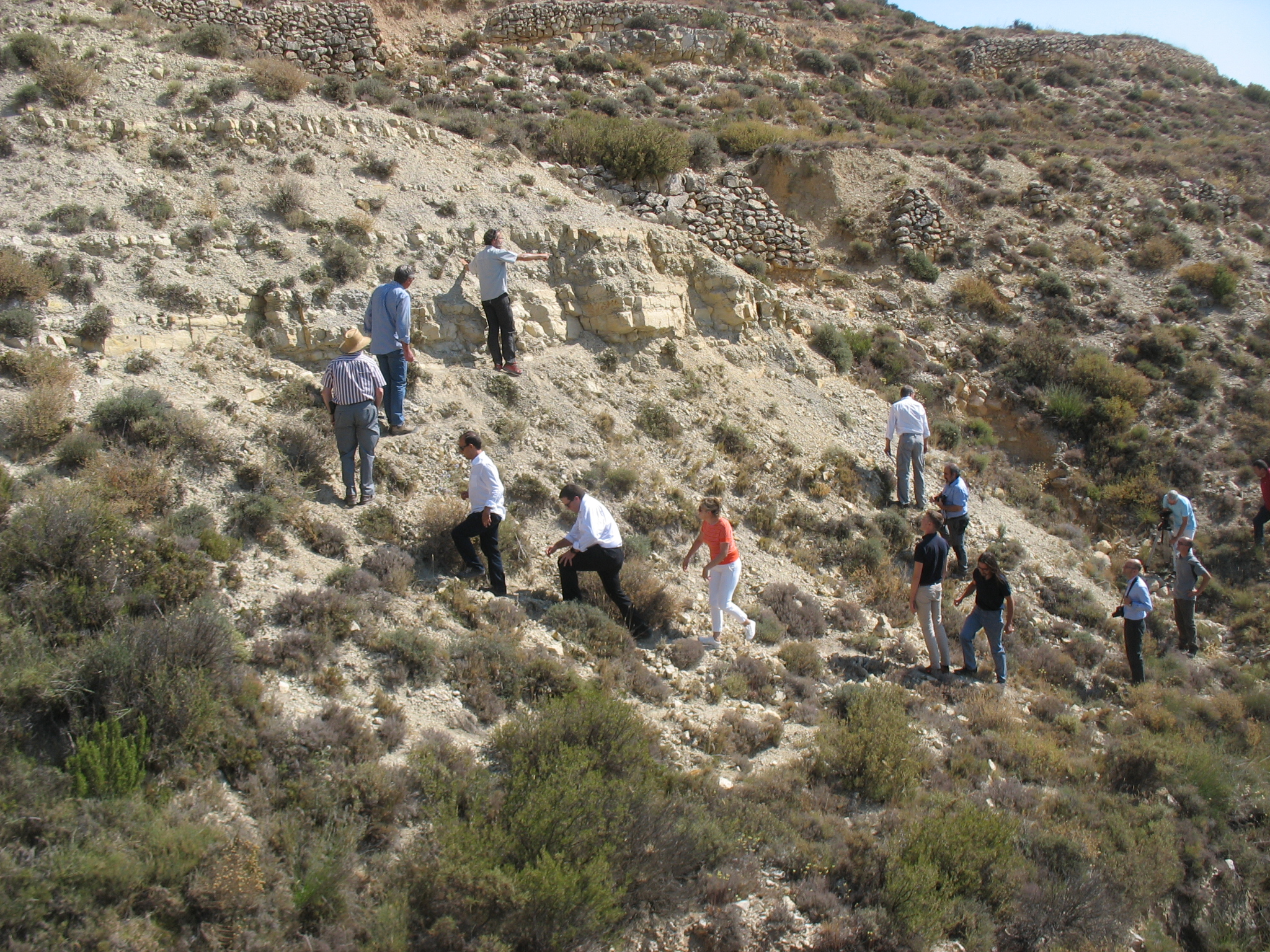
- The Aalenian GSSP in Spain

Chronology
← / Triassic–Jurassic extinction event
Subdivision of the Jurassic according to the ICS, as of 2024. Vertical axis scale: Millions of years ago

Etymology
- Name formality: Formal

Usage information
- Celestial body: Earth
- Regional usage: Global (ICS)
- Time scale(s) used: ICS Time Scale

Definition
- Chronological unit: Age
- Stratigraphic unit: Stage
- Time span formality: Formal
- Lower boundary definition: FAD of Ammonites Leioceras opalinum and Leioceras lineatum
- Lower boundary GSSP: Fuentelsaz, Spain; 41.1708°N 1.8333°W
- Lower GSSP ratified: 2000
- Upper boundary definition: FAD of the Ammonites Hyperlioceras mundum, Hyperlioceras furcatum, Braunsina aspera, and Braunsina elegantula
- Upper boundary GSSP: Cabo Mondego, Portugal; 40.1992°N 8.9042°W
- Upper GSSP ratified: 1996

The Aalenian ( /ɑːˈliːniən/) is a subdivision of the Middle Jurassic Epoch/Series of the geologic timescale that extends from about 174.7 ±0.8 Ma to about 170.9 ±0.8 Ma (million years ago). It was preceded by the Toarcian and succeeded by the Bajocian.

== Stratigraphic definitions ==
The Aalenian takes its name from the town of Aalen, some 70 km east of Stuttgart in Germany. The town lies at the northeastern end of the Swabian Jura. The name Aalenian was introduced in scientific literature by Swiss geologist Karl Mayer-Eymar in 1864.

The base of the Aalenian is defined as the place in the stratigraphic column where the ammonite genus Leioceras first appears. The global reference profile (GSSP) is located 500 meters north of the village of Fuentelsaz in the Spanish province of Guadalajara. The top of the Aalenian (the base of the Bajocian) is at the first appearance of ammonite genus Hyperlioceras.

In the Tethys domain, the Aalenian contains four ammonite biozones:

- zone of Graphoceras concavum
- zone of Brasilia bradfordensis
- zone of Ludwigia murchisonae
- zone of Leioceras opalinum
