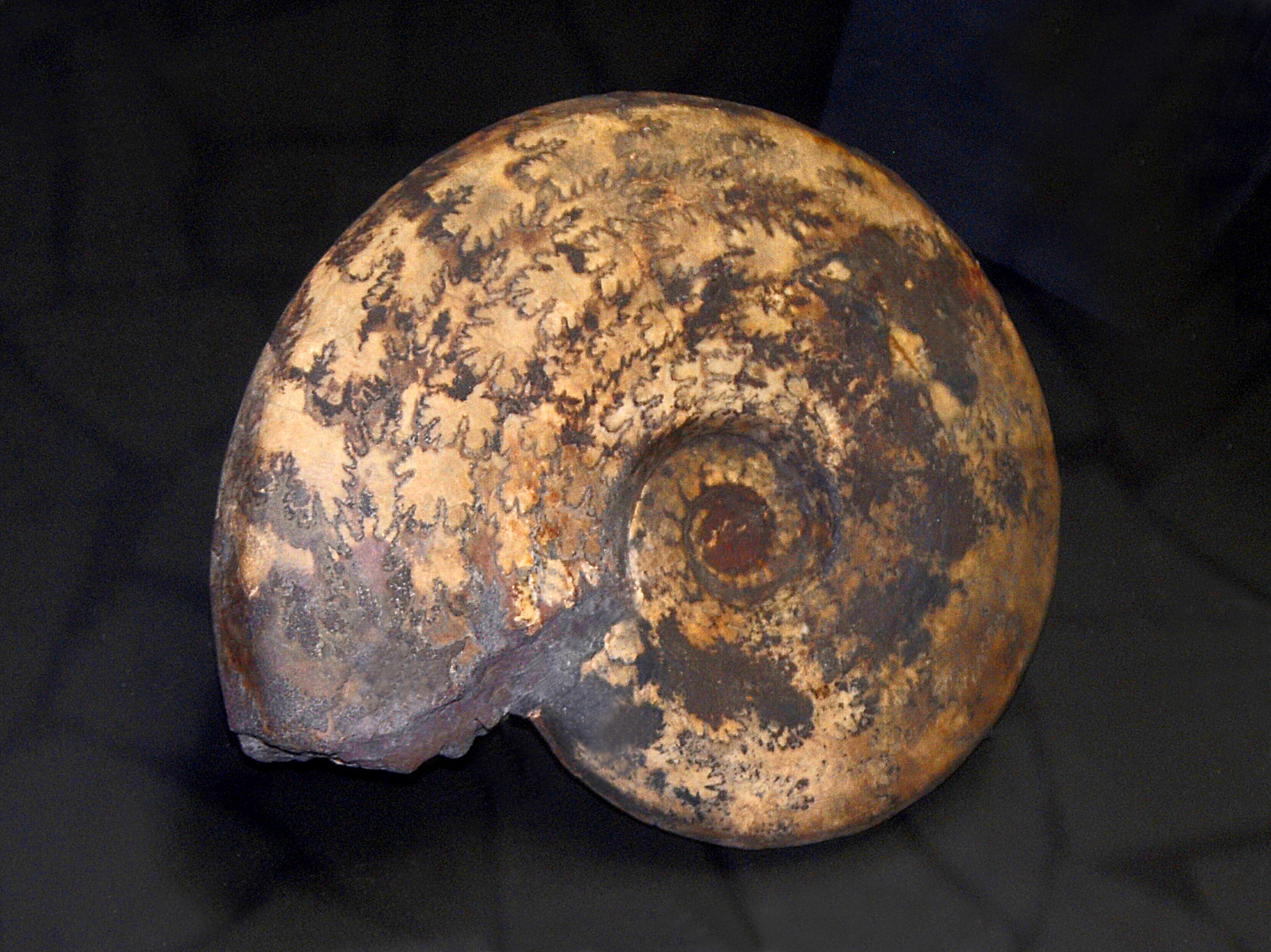
- Ludwigia murchisonae, Mid Jurassic, Germany

Scientific classification
- Kingdom: Animalia
- Phylum: Mollusca
- Class: Cephalopoda
- Subclass: †Ammonoidea
- Order: †Ammonitida
- Superfamily: †Hildoceratoidea
- Family: †Graphoceratidae; Buckman, 1905

Subfamilies
- See text

= Graphoceratidae =

Graphoceratidae Temporal range: Jurassic

Extinct family of ammonites

Graphoceratidae is an extinct family of ammonites in the order Ammonitida, which lived during the Jurassic.

== Distribution ==
Fossils are found in the Jurassic marine strata of Canada, France, Germany, Hungary, Italy, Morocco, Saudi Arabia, Spain and the United Kingdom.

== Genera ==
Subfamily Graphoceratinae Buckman, 1905

- Brasilia
- Graphoceras
- Hyperlioceras
- Ludwigia

Subfamily Leioceratinae Spath, 1936

- Canavarella
- Costileioceras
- Vaceckia
- Leioceras
- Staufenia
- Ancolioceras

Subfamily Dumortieriinae Haug, 1885

- Dumortieria
- Pleydellia
- Catulloceras
- Cotteswoldia
- Walkericeras
- Canavarina
- Paradumortieria

Subfamily Tmetoceratinae Spath, 1936

- Tmetoceras
