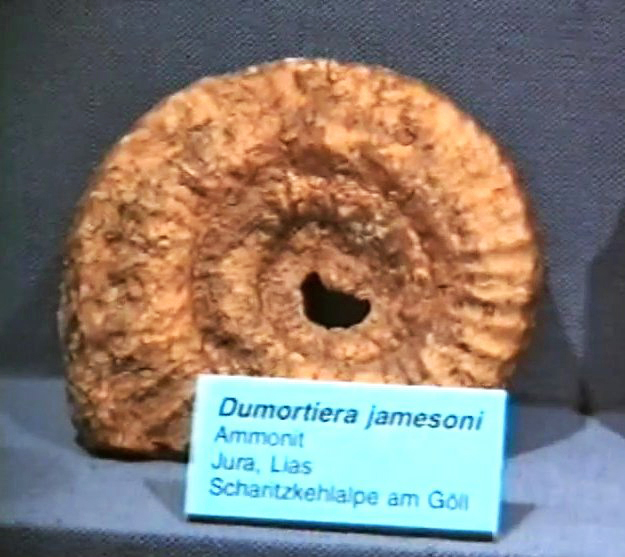
- Fossil of Dumortieria jamesoni at Haus der Natur, Salzburg

Scientific classification
- Kingdom: Animalia
- Phylum: Mollusca
- Class: Cephalopoda
- Subclass: †Ammonoidea
- Order: †Ammonitida
- Family: †Graphoceratidae
- Genus: †Dumortieria

Synonyms
- Paradumortieria Elmi and Caloo-Fortier 1985; Phenakoceras Maubeuge 1949; Phenakocerites Maubeuge 1950

= Dumortieria =

Dumortieria Temporal range: Late Jurassic

Genus of molluscs (fossil)

Dumortieria is a genus of ammonites belonging to the family Graphoceratidae.

== Fossil record ==
These cephalopods were fast-moving nektonic carnivores. They lived in the Early Jurassic, upper Toarcian age (from about 180.1 to 175.6 million years ago). Fossils of species within this genus can be found in Bulgaria, Canada, France, Germany, Hungary, Iran, Italy, Spain and Tunisia.

== Description ==
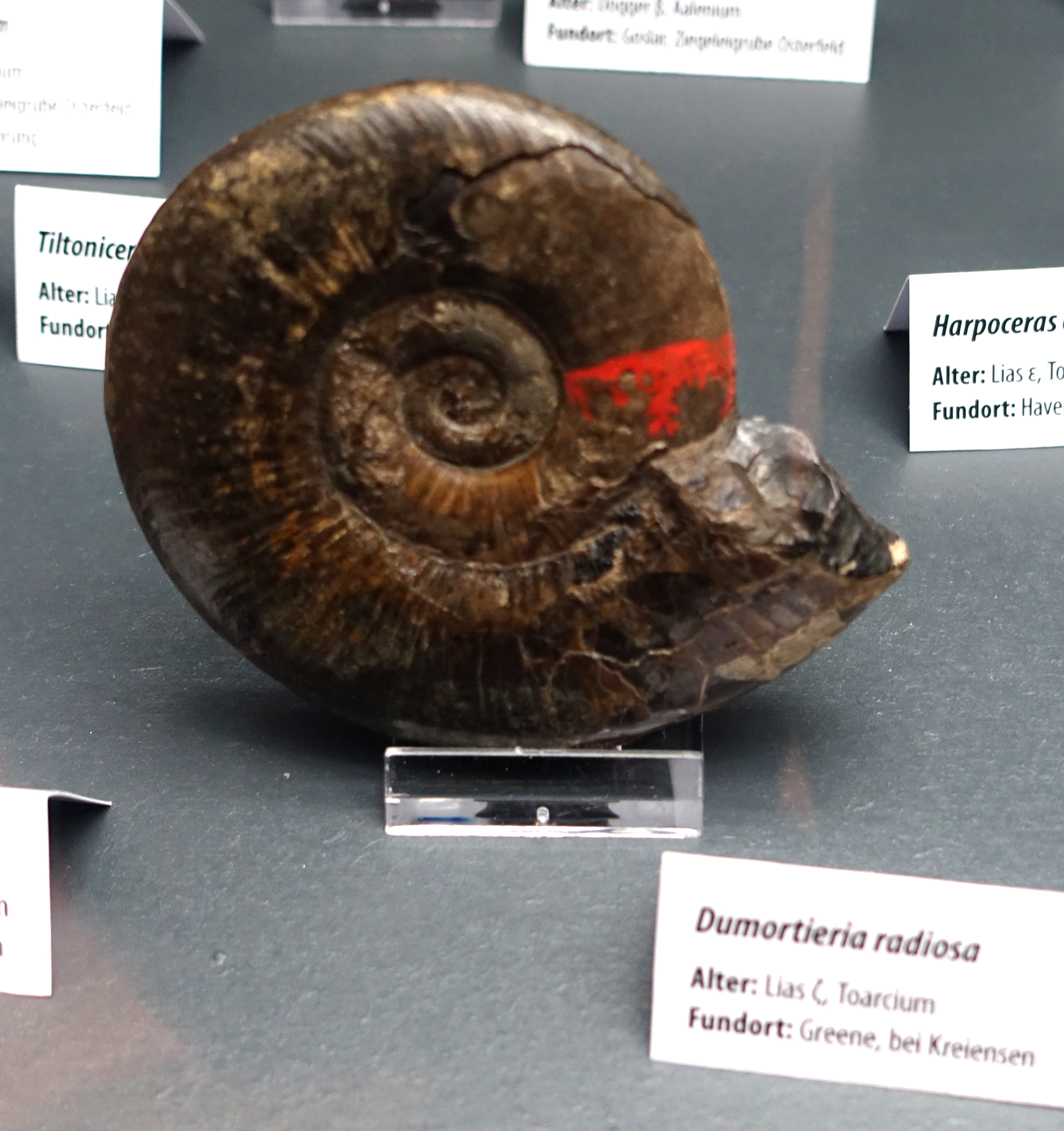
Fossil of Dumortieria radiosa

Dumortieria are rather similar to Grammoceras and Catulloceras from the same age, having a thin, discoidally evolute shell with simple, gently sigmoid ribbing and a low ventral keel, but this genus has a less rounded venter and Catulloceras has a subquadrate whorl section.

== Species ==
Species within this genus include:

- Dumortieria brancoi Benecke 1905
- Dumortieria costula Reinecke 1818
- Dumortieria gundershofensis Haug 1887
- Dumortieria insignisimilis Braun 1867
- Dumortieria jamesoni (Sow.)
- Dumortieria kochi Benecke 1905
- Dumortieria latumbilicata Geczy 1967
- Dumortieria levesquei d'Orbigny 1844
- Dumortieria meneghinii Zittel 1887
- Dumortieria moorei Lycett 1857
- Dumortieria prisca Buckman 1891
- Dumortieria pseudoradiosa Branco 1879
- Dumortieria radians Reinecke 1818
- Dumortieria radiosa Seebach 1864
- Dumortieria rustica Buckman 1902
- Dumortieria sparsicosta Haug 1887
- Dumortieria striatulocostata Quenstedt 1885
- Dumortieria tabulata Buckman 1892

== See also ==
- List of ammonite genera
