= Neoludwigia =

Scientific classification
- Kingdom: Animalia
- Phylum: Arthropoda
- Class: Insecta
- Order: Coleoptera
- Suborder: Polyphaga
- Infraorder: Cucujiformia
- Family: Cerambycidae
- Subfamily: Lamiinae
- Tribe: Agapanthiini
- Genus: Neoludwigia; Sama, 2008
- Species: N. lixoides

Binomial name
- Neoludwigia lixoides (H. Lucas, 1847)

Synonyms
- Agapanthia lixoides Lucas, 1847; Agapanthia (Ludwigia) lixoides Lucas, 1847; Ludwigia lixoides (Lucas, 1847); Ludwigia lixoides insuturalis Pic, 1934

Genus of beetles

Neoludwigia is a monotypic beetle genus in the family Cerambycidae described by Sama in 2008. Its only species, Neoludwigia lixoides, was described by Hippolyte Lucas in 1847.
