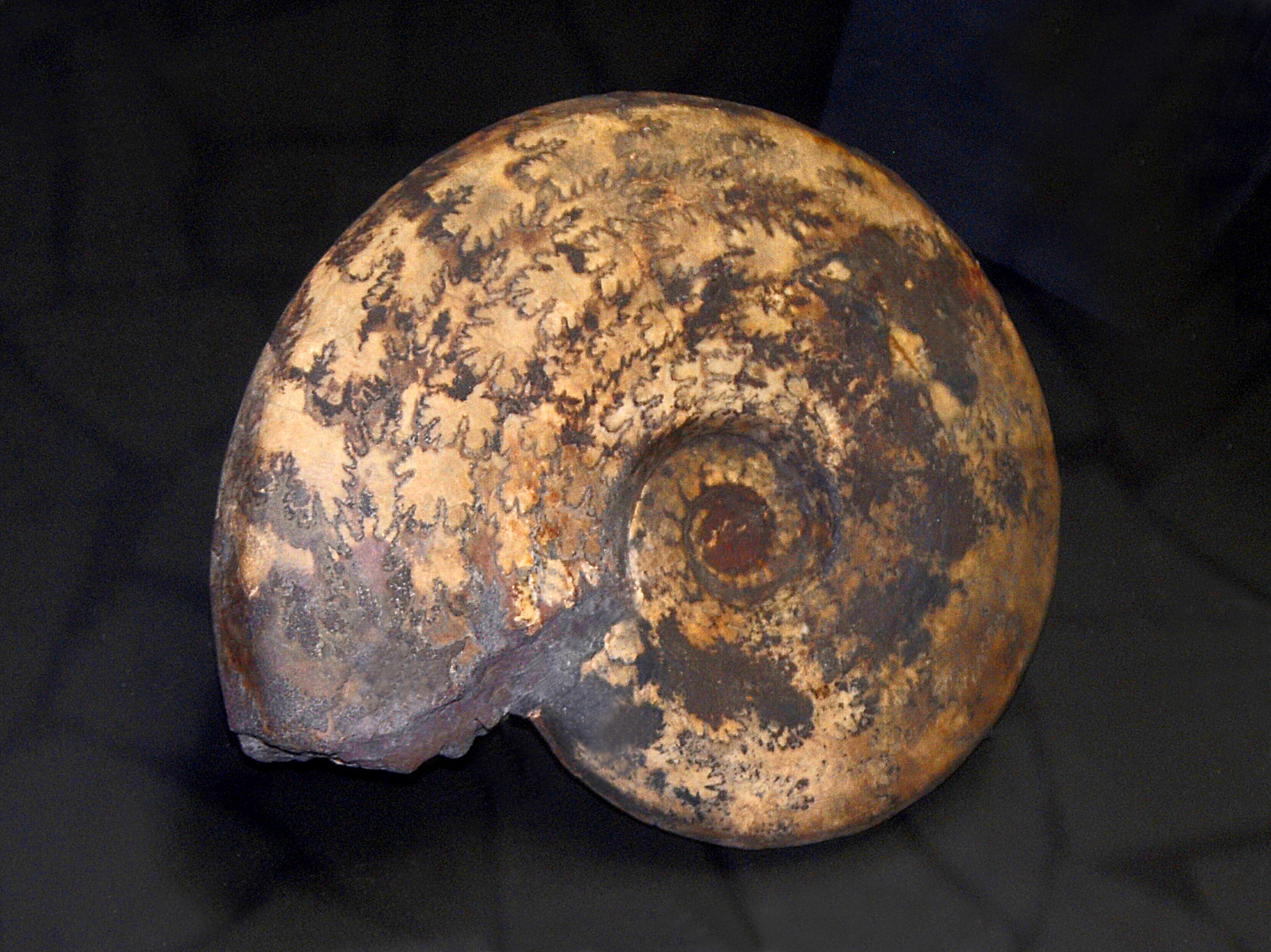
- Ludwigia murchisonae, Mid Jurassic, Germany

Scientific classification
- Kingdom: Animalia
- Phylum: Mollusca
- Class: Cephalopoda
- Subclass: †Ammonoidea
- Order: †Ammonitida
- Family: †Graphoceratidae
- Subfamily: †Graphoceratinae
- Genus: †Ludwigia; Bayle, 1878

Species
- L. murchisonae

= Ludwigia (ammonite) =

Ludwigia Temporal range: Aalenian

Genus of Jurassic-aged ammonite cephalopods

Ludwigia is an extinct genus of ammonites in the family Graphoceratidae, which lived during the Middle Jurassic.

== Species ==
- L. murchisonae Sowerby, 1825, which has an elaborate ribbing and a strong ridge along the dorsal surface of the shell.

== Distribution ==
Fossils of Ludwigia murchisonae are found in the Jurassic marine strata of France, Germany, Hungary, Spain and the United Kingdom.
