= Fuentelsaz =

Fuentelsaz, Spain
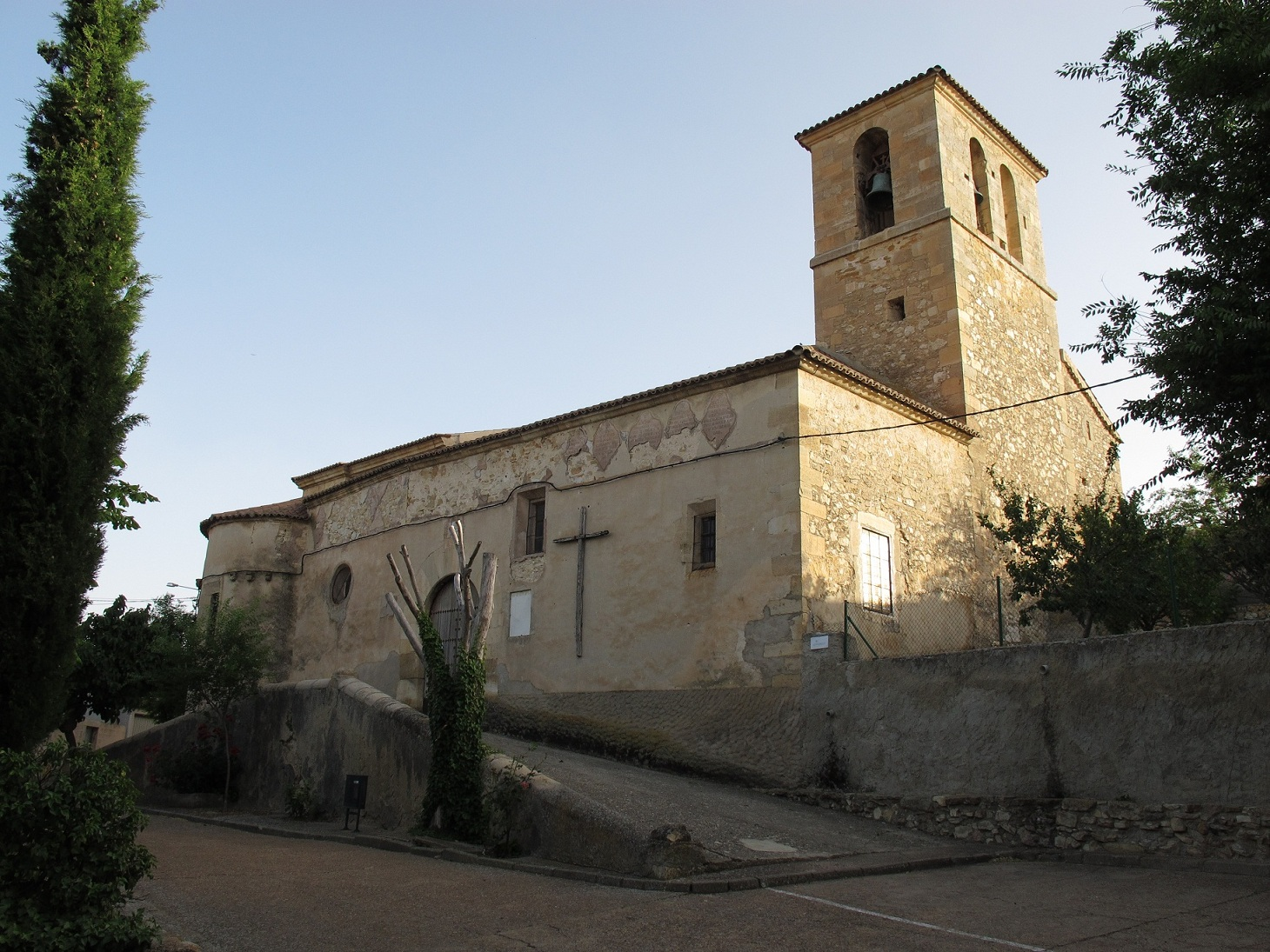

- Coat of arms

- Location within Province of Guadalajara Location within Castilla-La Mancha Location within Spain
- Coordinates: 41°04′29″N 1°49′46″W
- Country: Spain
- Autonomous community: Castile-La Mancha
- Province: Guadalajara
- Municipality: Fuentelsaz

Area
  - Total: 40 km^{2} (15 sq mi)

Population (2025-01-01)
  - Total: 82
  - Density: 2.0/km^{2} (5.3/sq mi)
- Time zone: UTC+1 (CET)
  - Summer (DST): UTC+2 (CEST)

Fuentelsaz is a municipality located in the province of Guadalajara, Castile-La Mancha, Spain. According to the 2004 census (INE), the municipality has a population of 118 inhabitants.
