= Siliciclastic =

Type of rocks that are almost exclusively silica-bearing

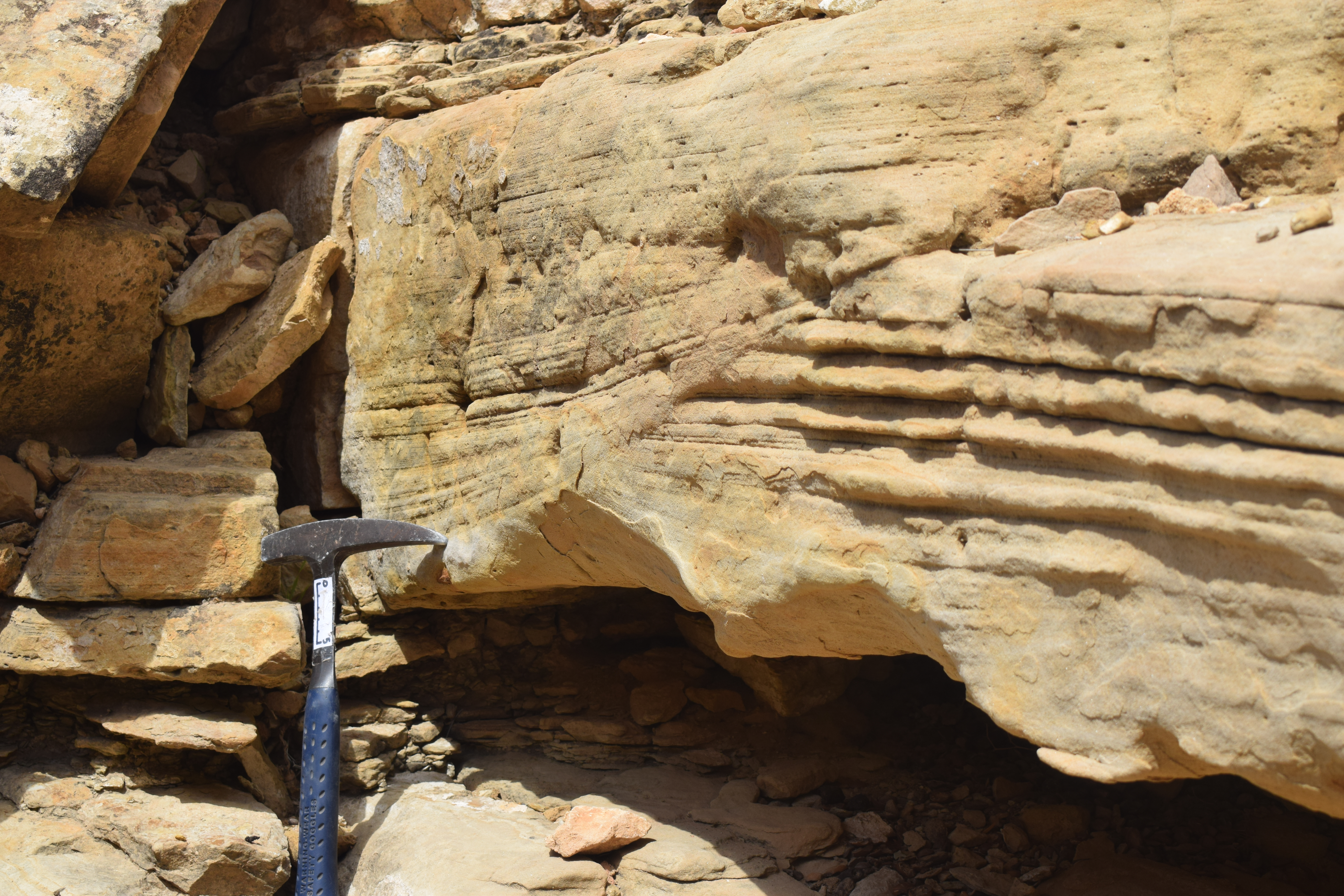
Cross beds in siliciclastic shoreface sediment (Agadir-Essaouira Basin, Morocco)

Siliciclastic (or siliclastic) rocks are clastic noncarbonate sedimentary rocks that are composed primarily of silicate minerals, such as quartz or clay minerals. Siliciclastic rock types include mudrock, sandstone, and conglomerate.

Siliciclastic sediments are silica-based sediments, lacking carbon compounds, which are formed from pre-existing rocks, by breakage, transportation and redeposition to form sedimentary rock.
