= Middle Jurassic =

Second part of the Jurassic geological period, from 174 to 161 million years ago

- 174.7 ± 0.8 – 161.5 ± 1.0 Ma
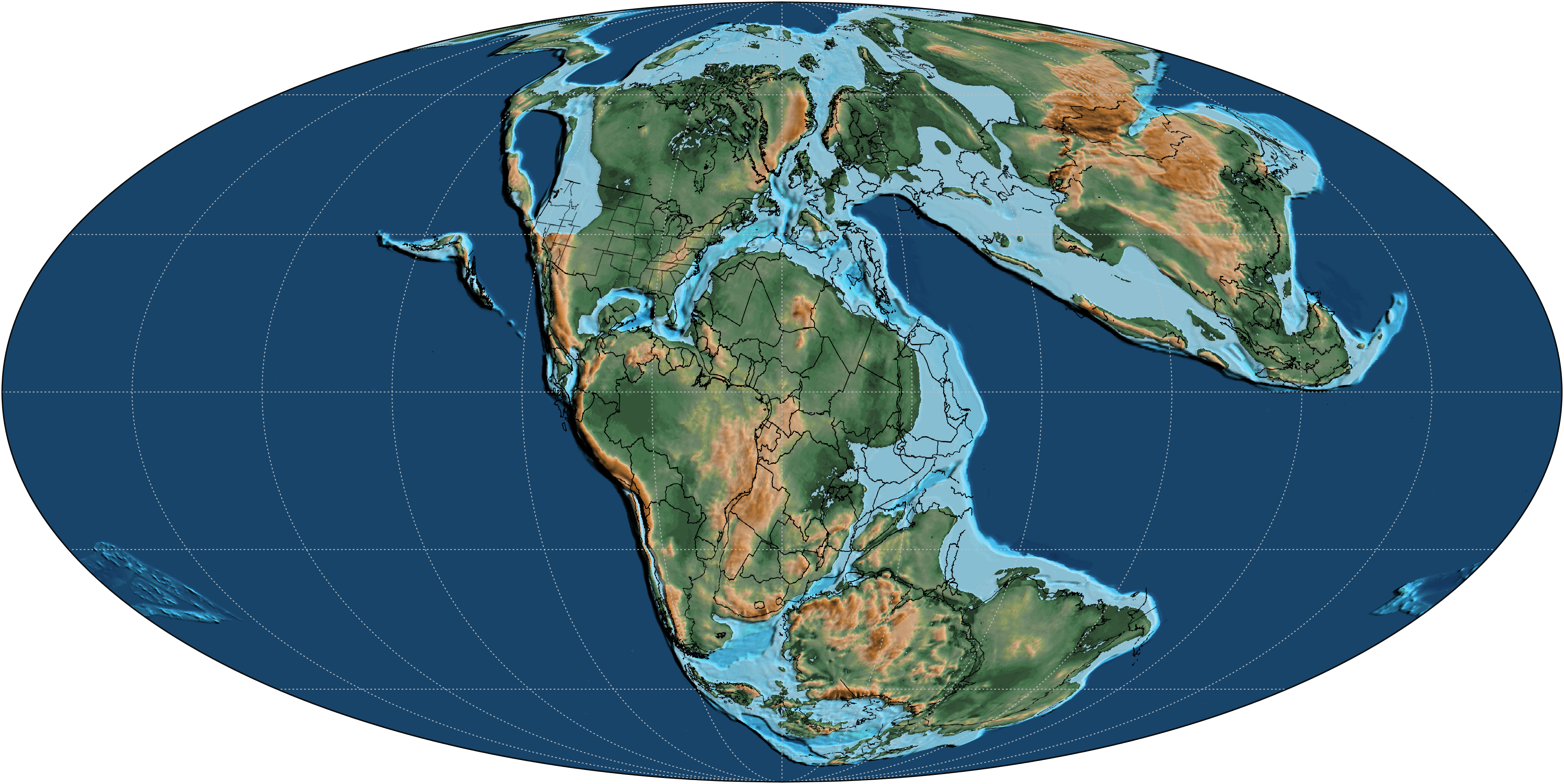
- A map of the world 170 million years ago during the Middle Jurassic Epoch, Bajocian Age

Chronology
← / Triassic–Jurassic extinction event
Subdivision of the Jurassic according to the ICS, as of 2024. Vertical axis scale: Millions of years ago

Etymology
- Name formality: Formal

Usage information
- Celestial body: Earth
- Regional usage: Global (ICS)
- Time scale(s) used: ICS Time Scale

Definition
- Chronological unit: Epoch
- Stratigraphic unit: Series
- Time span formality: Formal
- Lower boundary definition: FAD of the Ammonites Leioceras opalinum and Leioceras lineatum
- Lower boundary GSSP: Fuentelsaz, Spain; 41.1708°N 1.8333°W
- Lower GSSP ratified: 2000
- Upper boundary definition: Not formally defined
- Upper boundary definition candidates: Horizon of Ammonite Cardioceras redcliffense.
- Upper boundary GSSP candidate section(s): Redcliff Point, Dorset, UK; Savouron, Provence, France

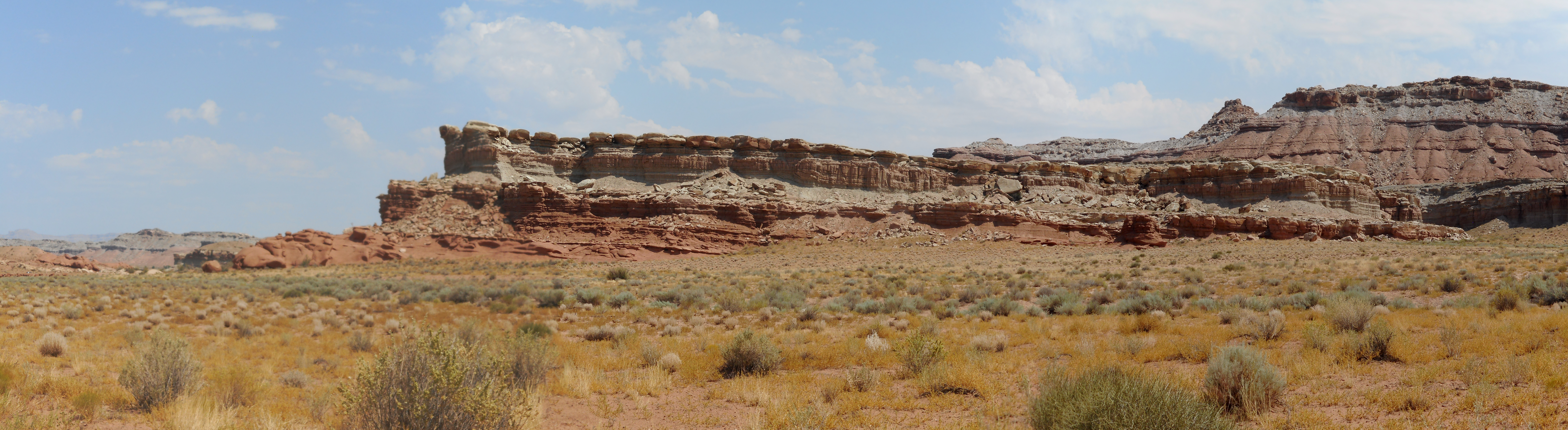
Middle Jurassic strata of the San Rafael Group, Colorado Plateau.

The Middle Jurassic is the second epoch of the Jurassic Period. It lasted from about 174.1 to 161.5 million years ago. Fossils of land-dwelling animals, such as dinosaurs, from the Middle Jurassic are relatively rare, but geological formations containing land animal fossils include the Forest Marble Formation in England, the Kilmaluag Formation in Scotland, the Calcaire de Caen of France, the Daohugou Beds in China, the Itat Formation in Russia, the Tiourarén Formation of Niger, and the Isalo III Formation of western Madagascar. Rocks of the Middle Jurassic were formerly (until about 1980s) in Europe called Dogger or Brown Jurassic.

== Paleogeography ==
During the Middle Jurassic Epoch, Pangaea began to separate into Laurasia and Gondwana, and the Atlantic Ocean formed. Eastern Laurasia was tectonically active as the Cimmerian plate continued to collide with Laurasia's southern coast, completely closing the Paleo-Tethys Ocean. A subduction zone on the coast of western North America continued to create the Ancestral Rocky Mountains. Significant subduction zones were active along practically all of the continental edges surrounding Pangea, as well as in southern Tibet, southeastern Europe, and other locations, to allow the formation of fresh seabed in the proto-Atlantic Ocean. Plate tectonic activity in subduction zones caused the construction of north-south mountain ranges such as the Rocky Mountains and the Andes all along the west coast of North, Central, and South America.

== Fauna ==
The Middle Jurassic is one of the key periods in the history of life on Earth. Many groups, including dinosaurs and mammals, diversified during this time.

=== Marine life ===
During this time, marine life (including ammonites and bivalves) flourished. Ichthyosaurs, although common, are reduced in diversity; the top marine predators, the pliosaurs, grew to the size of killer whales and larger (e.g. Pliosaurus, Liopleurodon). Plesiosaurs became common at this time, and metriorhynchids first appeared. In the Jurassic seas, a wide range of animals swam. Cartilaginous and bony fish were plentiful. Large fish and marine reptiles were plentiful.

=== Terrestrial life ===
Many of the major groups of dinosaurs emerged during the Middle Jurassic, (including cetiosaurs, brachiosaurs, megalosaurs and primitive ornithopods).

Descendants of the therapsids, the cynodonts, were still flourishing along with the dinosaurs. These included the tritylodonts and mammals. Mammals remained quite small, but were diverse and numerous in faunas from around the world. Tritylodonts were larger, and also had an almost global distribution. The first crown-group mammals appeared in the late Early Jurassic. A group of cynodonts, the trithelodonts, were becoming rare and eventually became extinct at the end of this epoch.

== Flora ==
Conifers were dominant in the Middle Jurassic. Other plants, such as ginkgoes, cycads, and ferns were also common.

== See also ==
- Early Jurassic
- Late Jurassic
