= Bajocian =

Second age of the middle Jurassic

- 170.9 ± 0.8 – 168.2 ± 1.2 Ma

Chronology
← / Triassic–Jurassic extinction event
Subdivision of the Jurassic according to the ICS, as of 2024. Vertical axis scale: Millions of years ago

Etymology
- Name formality: Formal

Usage information
- Celestial body: Earth
- Regional usage: Global (ICS)
- Time scale(s) used: ICS Time Scale

Definition
- Chronological unit: Age
- Stratigraphic unit: Stage
- Time span formality: Formal
- Lower boundary definition: FAD of the Ammonites Hyperlioceras mundum, Hyperlioceras furcatum, Braunsina aspera, and Braunsina elegantula
- Lower boundary GSSP: Cabo Mondego, Portugal; 40.1992°N 8.9042°W
- Lower GSSP ratified: 1996
- Upper boundary definition: FAD of the Ammonite Gonolkites convergen
- Upper boundary GSSP: Ravin du Bès, Bas-Auran, Alpes de Haute, France; 43.9606°N 6.3153°E
- Upper GSSP ratified: July 2008

In the geologic timescale, the Bajocian is an age and stage in the Middle Jurassic. It lasted from approximately 170.9 ± 0.8 Ma to around 168.2 ± 1.2 Ma (million years ago). The Bajocian Age succeeds the Aalenian Age and precedes the Bathonian Age.

== Stratigraphic definitions ==
The Bajocian Stage takes its name from the Latin name (Bajocae) of the town of Bayeux, in the region of Normandy in France. The stage was named and introduced in scientific literature by French palaeontologist Alcide d'Orbigny in 1842.

The base of the Bajocian stage is defined as the place in the stratigraphic column where fossils of the ammonite genus Hyperlioceras first appear. A global reference profile (a GSSP) for the base is located at Murtinheira, close to Cabo Mondego in Portugal. The top of the Bajocian (the base of the Bathonian) is at the first appearance of ammonite species Parkinsonia convergens.

=== Subdivision ===
The Bajocian is often divided into Lower/Early and Upper/Late subages or substages.

In the Tethys domain, the Bajocian contains seven ammonite biozones:

- zone of Parkinsonia parkinsoni
- zone of Garantiana garantiana
- zone of Strenoceras niortense
- zone of Stephanoceras humphriesianum
- zone of Sonninia propinquans
- zone of Witchellia laeviuscula
- zone of Hyperlioceras discites
