= Ovaticeras =

Ovaticeras Temporal range: Late Pliensbachian - Early Toarcian

Scientific classification
- Kingdom: Animalia
- Phylum: Mollusca
- Class: Cephalopoda
- Subclass: †Ammonoidea
- Order: †Ammonitida
- Family: †Hildoceratidae
- Subfamily: †Harpoceratinae
- Genus: †Ovaticeras; Buckman, 1918

Type species
- Ammonites ovatus Young & Bird, 1822

Species
- see text

Genus of molluscs (fossil)

Ovaticeras is an extinct genus of cephalopod belonging to the family Hildoceratidae. These cephalopods existed in the Jurassic period, during upper Pliensbachian and lower Toarcian. Its fossils were found in Europe, North Africa and possibly also in Canada and Vietnam. It might have evolved from Harpoceras falciferum (in the case of species O. ovatum, as O. paltoides lived before Harpoceras falciferum) and died out without leaving any descendants.

== Description ==
Compressed, moderately involute shell with keel and narrow venter. Cross section of whorl is elliptical, with rounded umbilical edge and sloping umbilical wall. Falcoid, or sinuous ribs are weak, or moderate on inner whorls, while on outer whorls, they are becoming striate, or these whorls are smooth. Diameter of complete adult shell is 120–250 mm. Dimorphism is unknown.

== Species ==
O. ovatum Young & Bird, 1822

Most well known and type for this genus. While it is common in Yorkshire, it is rare in other locations. It has several synonyms:

- Ammonites ovatus Young & Bird, 1822
- Ovaticeras pseudovatum Buckman 1918

O. paltoides Wiedenmayer, 1980

Species with softly falcoid ribs. Shell is disc-shaped and involution is hiding 2/5 of previous whorl. It has been found only in Switzerland. Stratigraphical position is unknown. It might come from hawskerense subzone, but it is certainly from before tenuicostatum zone.

O. (Pacificeras) propinquum Whiteaves, 1884

Subgenus Pacificeras (Repin, 1970) is now considered to be synonym of Tiltoniceras, so this species is now named as Tiltoniceras propinquum.

O. facetum Repin, 1966

Synonym of Tiltoniceras propinquum.

O. perplexum Fucini, 1929

Synonym of Neolioceratoides perplexus Fucini, 1929.

O. mite Fucini, 1929

Synonym of Parahildaites mitis Fucini, 1929.
