= Schistes bitumineux =

- Stratigraphic range: Early Jurassic, ~183 Ma
- Type: Geological formation
- Unit of: Sachrang Formation
- Sub-units: Bommelscheuer Zone; Exaratum Subchronozone; Falciferum Subchronozone; Op Zämer Zone; Serpentinum Chronozone
- Underlies: Marnes à Bifrons Formation
- Thickness: 3.6 metres (12 ft) to 7.2 metres (24 ft) thick

Lithology
- Primary: Shale
- Other: Apatite and limonite

Location
- Country: Luxembourg
- Extent: Edward Steichen Industrial Zone, Bascharage

The Schistes bitumineux (French for Oil shale/Bituminous shale) is an Early Jurassic geologic formation in Bascharage, Luxembourg that is located within an oil shale, hence the name.

== Geology ==
This formation may be part of the larger Sachrang Formation, which also outcrops in Luxembourg, among other countries. The type locality is the Edward Steichen Industrial Zone near Bascharage and it is part of a near-continuous layer of hard, finely laminated, micritic carbonate nodules.

The Schistes bitumineux underlies the middle Toarcian Marnes à Bifrons Formation, which outcrops in both Luxembourg and France.

== History ==
Fossils have been found in the Schistes bitumineux since at least the 1930s, and the formation has been studied since at least 1938. The Schistes bitumineux was identified as being a unit of the Sachrang Formation shortly after its discovery.

Henrotay et al. (1989) produced a detailed list of the known fossils from the Schistes bitumineux.

The Serpentinum Chronozone and Exaratum Subchronozone were identified by Page (2003) based on ammonite remains found in the area.

In May 2022, during the Lost Ocean Digging, the Luxembourg National Museum of Natural History excavated the lower part of the formation for the first time. The lower part of the formation was described in more detail by Fuchs, Weis & Thuy (2024).

== Paleofauna and paleoflora ==
- Aptychus sp.
- Belemnitida indet.
- Beloteuthis sp.
- Bositra buchi
- Bositra sp.
- Caturus sp.
- Chondroteuthis wunnenbergi
- Cleviceras exaratum
- Crocodyliformes indet.
- Coelodiscus sp.
- Dactylioceras sp.
- Dapedium sp.
- Harpoceras falcifer
- Harpoceras sp.
- Hildaites murleyi
- Hildoceras sp.
- Geopeltis sp.
- Ichthyosauria indet.
- Lepidotes elvensis
- Lepidotes sp.
- Leptolepis coryphenoides
- Leptolepis sp.
- Lobolytoceras cf. ceratophagum
- Macrospondylus bollensis
- Nautiloidea indet.
- Otozamites sp.
- Pachycormidae indet.
- Pachycormus sp.
- Phthitogomphus angulatus
- Pholidophorus sp.
- Phylloceras sp.
- Proeryon sp.
- Pterosauria indet.
- Schizosphaerella punctulata
- Simoniteuthis michaelyi
- Sternorrhyncha indet.
- Tetragonolepis sp.
- Thyon sp.
- Tiltoniceras sp.
- Vertebrata indet.
