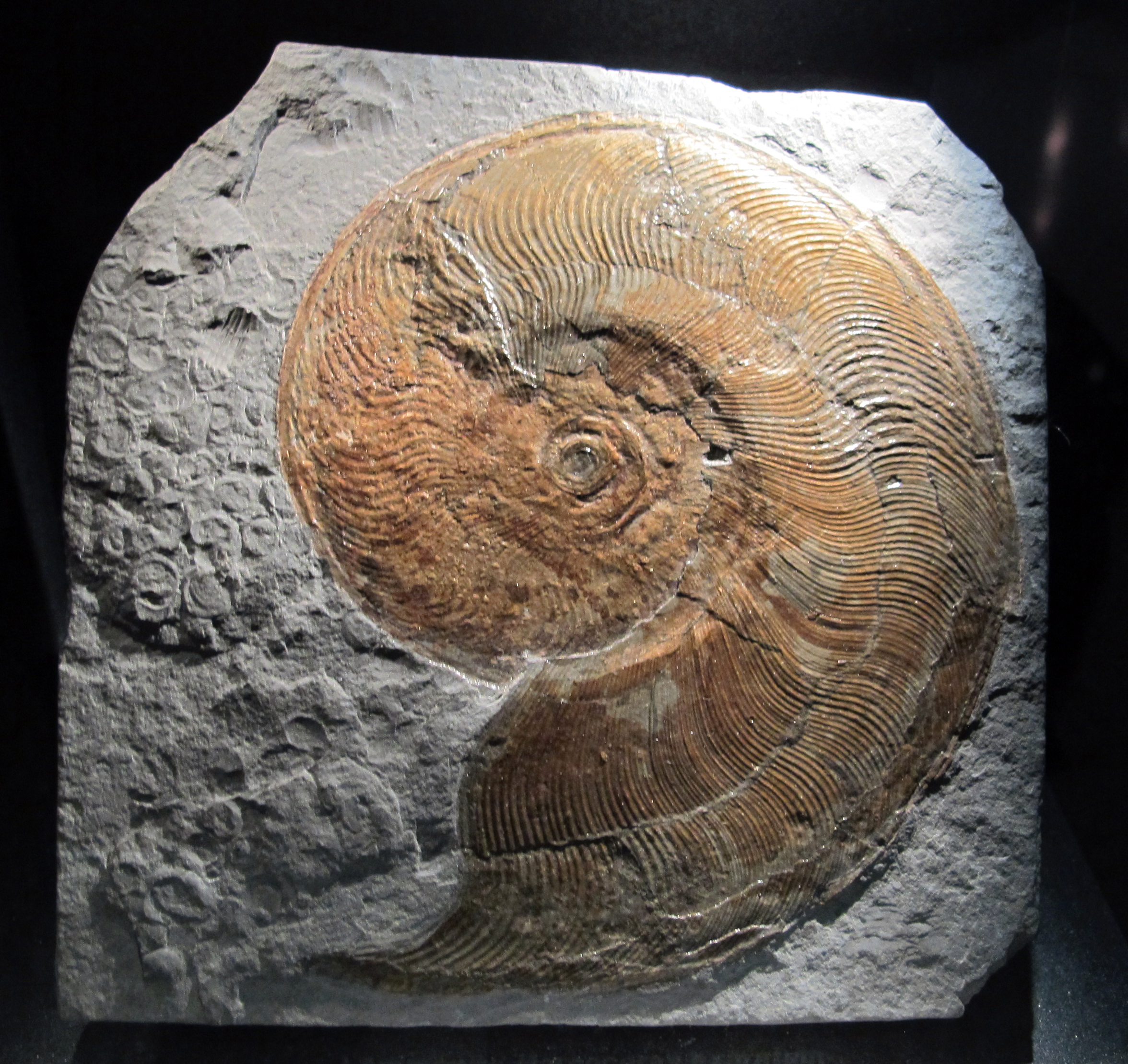
- Cleviceras exaratum

Scientific classification
- Kingdom: Animalia
- Phylum: Mollusca
- Class: Cephalopoda
- Subclass: †Ammonoidea
- Order: †Ammonitida
- Family: †Hildoceratidae
- Subfamily: †Harpoceratinae
- Genus: †Cleviceras; Howarth, 1992

Type species
- Ammonites exaratus Young & Bird, 1828

Species
- C. exaratum Young & Bird, 1828; C. elegans Sowerby, 1815; C. chrysanthemum Yokoyama, 1904

= Cleviceras =

Cleviceras Temporal range: Early Jurassic, Toarcian

Genus of molluscs (fossil)

Cleviceras is an extinct genus of cephalopod belonging to the family Hildoceratidae. These cephalopods existed in the Jurassic period, during Toarcian and possibly even uppermost Pliensbachian age. Sometimes, it is considered to be a synonym of Eleganticeras.

== Etymology ==
Genus is named after Cleveland, and area in north England. Fossils of Cleviceras exaratum, type species of this genus are very abundant there.

== Distribution ==
Fossils of species contained in this genus have been found in the lower to middle Toarcian of Europe, Canada, Japan, Tibet, Siberia, Africa, or South America.

== Taxonomic history ==
First two described members of this genus (C. exaratum and C. elegans) were described as members of today invalid genus Ammonites. Later, they were reassigned into genus Harpoceras, into which was added third member of genus Cleviceras (C. chrysanthemum), formerly member of Hildoceras. In 1992, due to recognized different evolutionary history of Harpoceras and C. exaratum with C. elegans, genus Cleviceras has been erected, but with only two members, as C. chrysanthemum has been transferred into this genus only in 1994.

Sometimes, this genus is not considered as valid. Reasoning for this is, that when Howarth described it, he considered only specimens from Great Britain. According to him, reason for not adding species of this genus into Eleganticeras are much stronger ribs. But outside of Great Britain, there are some specimens of E. elegantulum, which also have strong ribs and on the other hand, specimens of C. exaratum are thicker, with bigger ventral area and are also more rounded than E. elegantulum. This opinion is not general and Cleviceras is often considered to be a valid genus.

== Description ==
Comparison of falcoid rib of Cleviceras exaratum (1) and falcate rib of Harpoceras falciferum (2)

Shells of Cleviceras show dimorphism in their size. While microconchs reach 16–62 mm in diameter, macroconchs shells width is 85–200 mm. They are moderately involute, compressed and have flat whorl sides. Umbilical walls can be sloping, vertical, or undercut. Keel is strong and floored, but in abnormal specimens might be missing. This kind of abnormality has been described as invalid genus Monestieria. Under this name were added not only specimens of Cleviceras, but also members of genera Protogrammoceras and Harpoceras. Ribs are falcoid and in small sizes of shell are bifurcating, later they are single. On the outer part of whorl, they are broad and flat. In adults, ribs become striate. There are no tubercules.

It differs from Eleganticeras by having stronger ribs and bigger sizes of adults in the case of both dimorphs. It is more evolute than Polyplectus. Difference between Cleviceras and early species of Harpoceras is, that Cleviceras does not have spiral groove, nor series of undulations at the falcate bend of the ribbing (but these are not appearing even in the case of all Harpoceras species). Ribs of Cleviceras are always falcoid, while in the case of some Harpoceras species, they are falcate. But, on some specimens of C. exaratum, there can appear grooved furrow, as in the case of type specimen.

== Evolutionary history ==
Cleviceras exaratum has probably evolved from Eleganticeras during Exaratum subzone of early Toarcian by getting much stronger ribs than its predecessor and evolved into C. elegans. This one might gave rise to Polyplectus and possibly even to Pseudolioceras. On the other hand, C. chrysanthemum is a possible evolutionary predecessor of Hildaites, but this genus might have also evolved from Protogrammoceras.

== Species ==
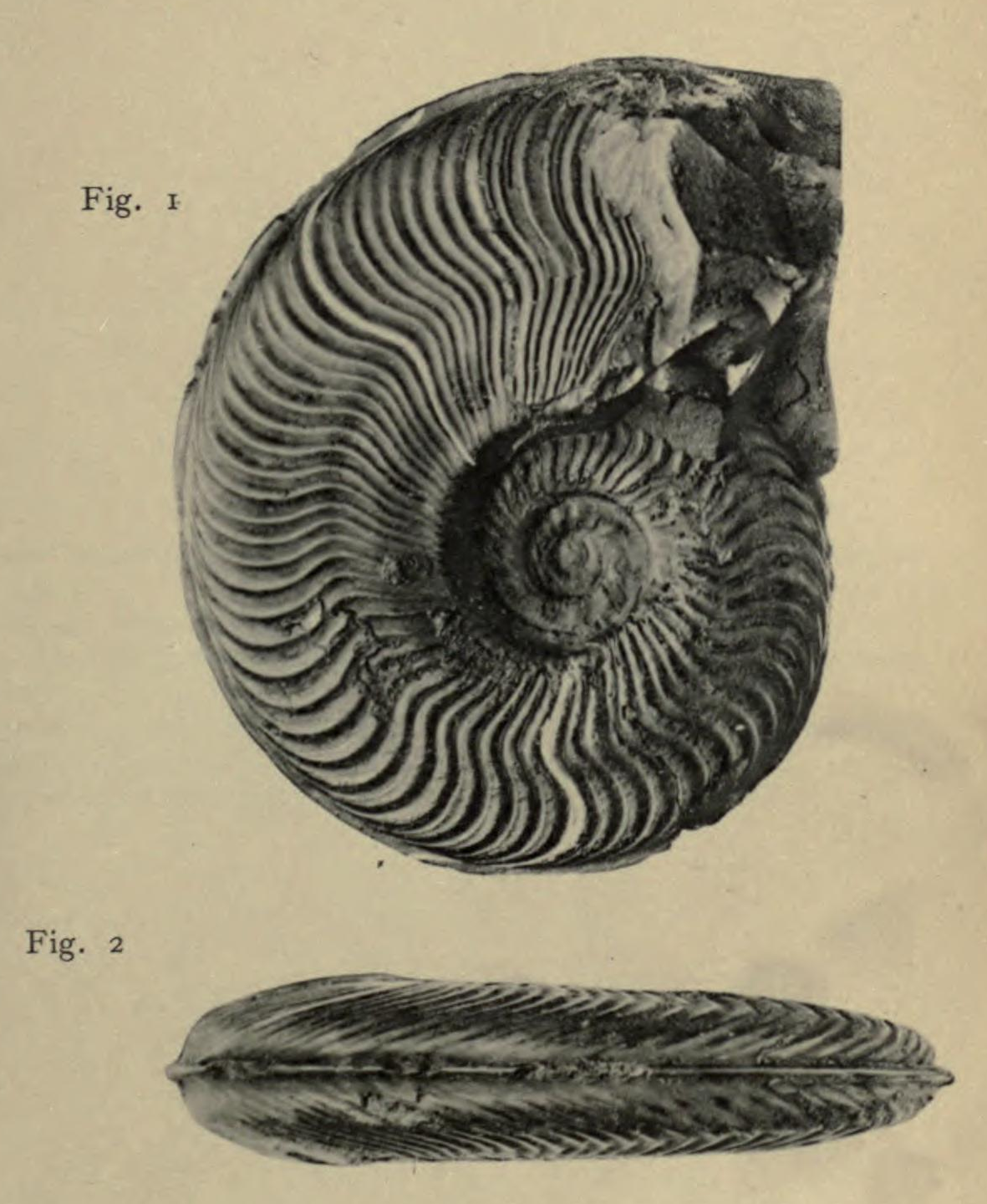
Cleviceras exaratum - type specimen

=== Cleviceras exaratum ===
Young & Bird, 1828

==== Namesake ====
'Exaratus' is Latin word for ploughed. This name has been used because of grooved furrow on the type specimen.

==== Synonyms ====
- Ammonites exaratus Young & Bird, 1828
- Ammonites erratus Simpson, 1843
- Ammonites multifoliatus Simpson, 1855
- Harpoceras exaratum
- Eleganticeras exaratum

==== Diagnosis ====
Involute shells that have compressed whorl section and strong keel. Umbilical walls can be vertical or undercut. There is huge size dimorphism. While adult microconchs are 16-49mm in diameter, adult macroconchs are 85-200mm in diameter. Falcoid ribs are bifurcating, or intercalated in diameters of up to 40-50mm, but then they are becoming single and at the end of the adult body chamber, they are striate.

==== Comparison with other taxa ====
As it has evolved directly from Eleganticeras elegantulum, there exists some transitional forms, that were found in Yorkshire. While C. exaratum has larger shell diameter than E. elegantulum, it is smaller, than C. elegans, which is also always more compressed. While in E. elegantulum, umbilical width growth during ontogeny, in C. exaratum it is constant and in the case of C. elegans, it is decreasing. Strength of ornamentation is also growing during their evolutionary process. Another similar species is Harpoceras serpentinum, which has been contemporaneous with C. exaratum. It differs from this species by being more evolute, having bevelled umbilical walls, similar, but still different ribs and also by having series of undulations near falcoid bend of the ribs.

==== Occurrence ====
Middle one-third of Exaratum Subzone of Falciferum Zone (Toarcian) of Europe, Canada and Siberia and possibly also from north Africa.

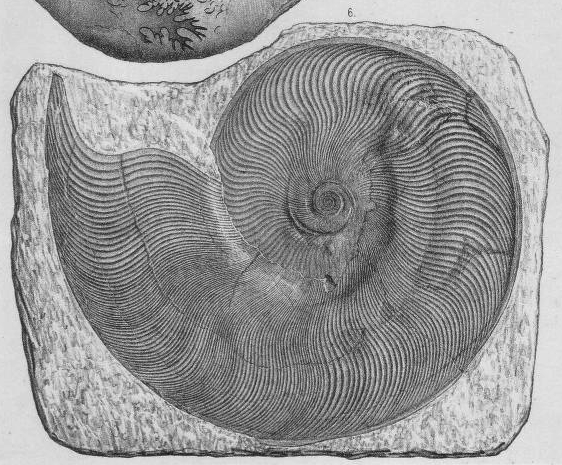
Cleviceras elegans

=== Cleviceras elegans ===
Sowerby, 1815

==== Namesake ====
'Elegans' is a Latin word for English 'elegant'.

==== Synonyms ====
- Ammonites elegans Sowerby, 1815
- Ammonites capellinus Schlotheim, 1820
- Harpoceras elegans
- Harpoceras capellinum
- Eleganticeras elegans

==== Diagnosis ====
It is more involute than its predecessor C. exaratum and has higher whorls. Sloping umbilical wall is forming a funnel shaped umbilicus and also a more compressed whorl section. Keel is strong. Nearly all ribs are single and they are of falcoid shape.. They are weak to moderate on microconchs, but stronger in middle growth stage of macroconchs. Later at the end of the body chamber, they become striate.

==== Comparison with other taxa ====
It is more involute than Cleviceras exaratum and Eleganticeras elegantulum, but as it is evolved directly from C. exaratum, there exists some transitional specimens. Also, C. exaratum has vertical, or undercut umbilical walls, while C. elegans has them bevelled, or sloping. C. elegans also has weaker and more striate ribs at sizes below 30mm diameter. Then, ribbing is the same. Its phylogenetic successor, genus Polyplectus has an oxycone shell with acutely angled venter, without differentiated keel and has also smaller umbilicus. There is difference in suture too, where Polyplectus has 3, or more auxiliary saddles. Harpoceras serpentinum, which has lived in the same time has a much wider umbilicus, ribs with shorter inner halves and a series of undulations at the falcoid bend of the ribs. Harpoceras falciferum has falcate ribs, much wider umbilicus and a spiral groove at the falcate bend of the ribs.

==== Occurrence ====
Upper one-third of Exaratum subzone of Falciferum zone (Toarcian) in Europe, NE of Siberia and western Canada.

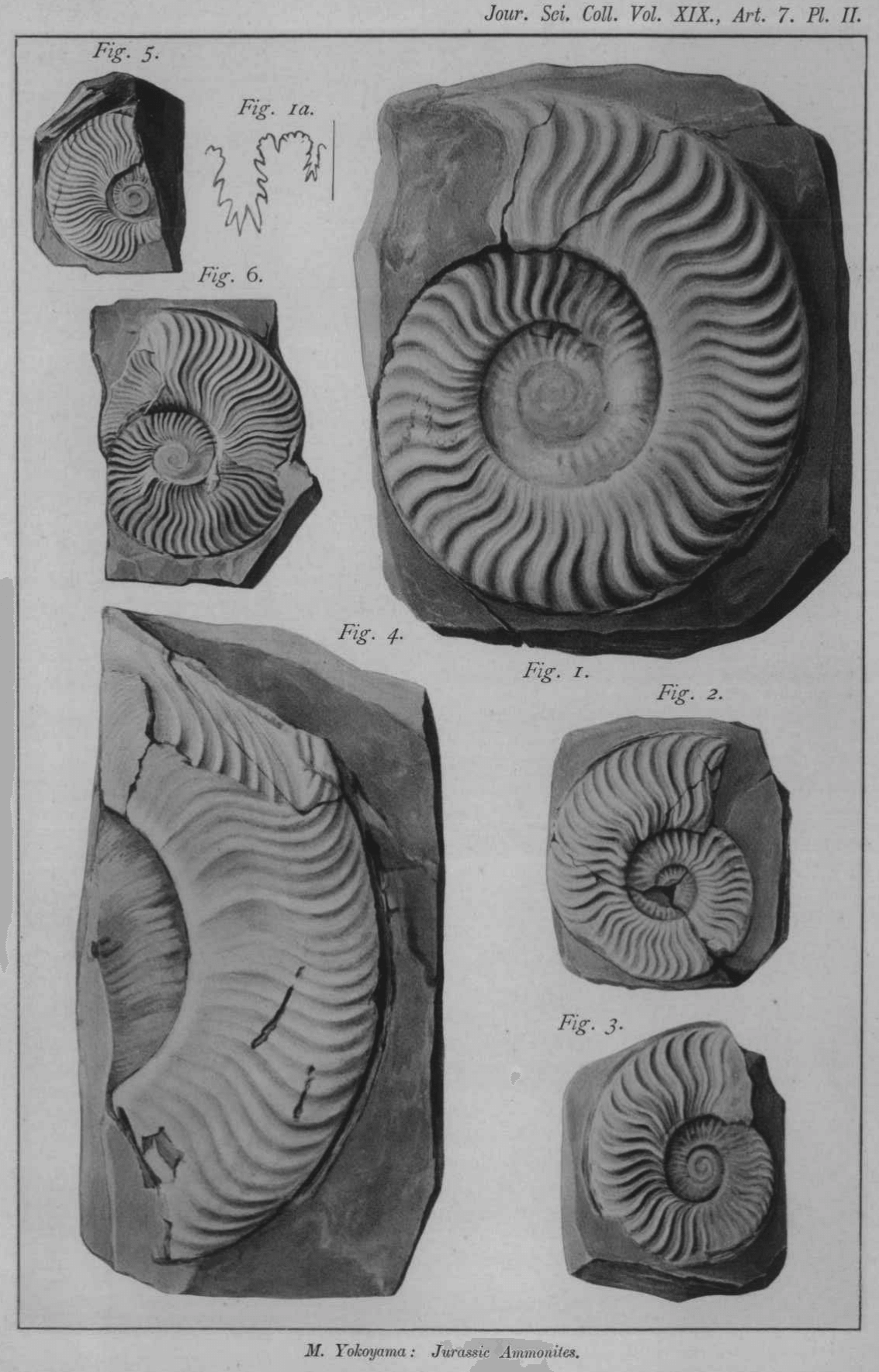
Cleviceras chrysanthemum (images 1 - 4, other images are of Harpoceras (Harpoceras) inouyei)

=== Cleviceras chrysanthemum ===
Yokoyama, 1904

==== Namesake ====
Chrysanthemum is genus of flowering plants from the family Asteraceae, that is often used in symbols in Japan.

==== Synonyms ====
- Hildoceras chrysanthemum Yokoyama, 1904
- Hildoceras densicostatum Yokoyama, 1904
- Harpoceras chrysanthemum
- Hildoceratoides chrysanthemum

==== Diagnosis ====
Shell is midvolute and its whorl section is ellipsoidal to rectangular. Vertical umbilical wall has abrupt, but still rounded umbilical shoulder. Carinate-sulcate venter is moderately wide. Keel is sharp and prominent. Sinuous, sharp and strong ribs are separated by inter-rib spaces, that are as wide as these ribs. Ribs have prorsiradiate direction up to approximately mid-flank, then they gently curve backward. After that, along ventrolateral shoulder, they again trend prorsiradiately.

==== Comparison with other taxa ====
While it occurs with Cleviceras cf. exaratum, ribs are less strongly curved. Similar species is Hildaites borealis, but it has shorter hafts of the ribs, has unicarinate-tabulate venter (and not unicarinate-bisulcate as in C. chrysanthemum) and somewhat subangular ventro-lateral shoulders, while C. chrysanthemum has gentle ventro-lateral shoulders. It is similar also to Harpoceras falciferum, but it does not have such long hafts of the ribs and also not such acute curve of the ribs in the middle of the flank.

==== Occurrence ====
C. chrysanthemum and C. cf. chrysanthemum are found in lower to middle Toarcian sediments of Japan, Siberia, Canada and South America.
