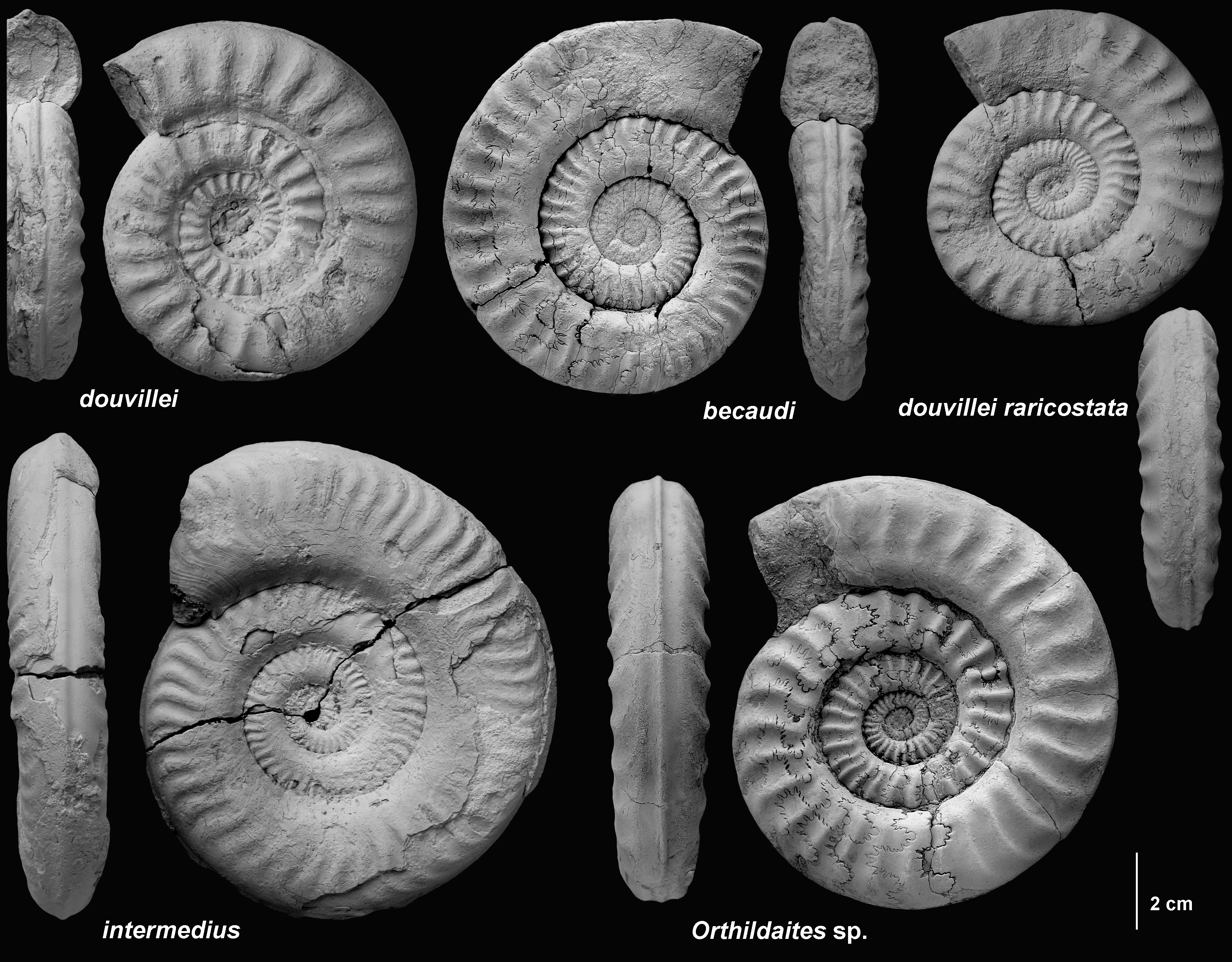

Scientific classification
- Kingdom: Animalia
- Phylum: Mollusca
- Class: Cephalopoda
- Subclass: †Ammonoidea
- Order: †Ammonitida
- Family: †Hildoceratidae
- Subfamily: †Hildoceratinae
- Genus: †Orthildaites; Buckman, 1923

Type species
- Orthildaites orthus Buckman, 1923

Species
- O. orthus Buckman, 1923; O. douvillei Haug, 1884; O. intermedius Guex, 1973; O. becaudi Kovács, 2012

= Orthildaites =

Orthildaites Temporal range: Toarcian

Genus of molluscs (fossil)

Orthildaites is a genus of ammonites that lived during the lower Toarcian stage of early Jurassic, during Falciferum subzone.

== Description ==
Shell of these ammonites had quadrate whorl section with broad venter and strong keel in the center. Almost straight ribs were curving slightly forward at ventrolateral edge. Coiling has been evolute. It has evolved form genus Hildaites and gave rise to Hildoceras from which it differs in morphology by broader whorls and straight ribs.

== Remarks ==
Orthildaites fossils were found in Europe and north Africa. Only one (or two) species is known in the Toarcian NW European domain, its diversity is higher in the Mediterranean faunal province.

Validity of O. orthus is debated, as sometimes it is considered to be valid, while other authors consider it to be a synonym of O. douvillei.
