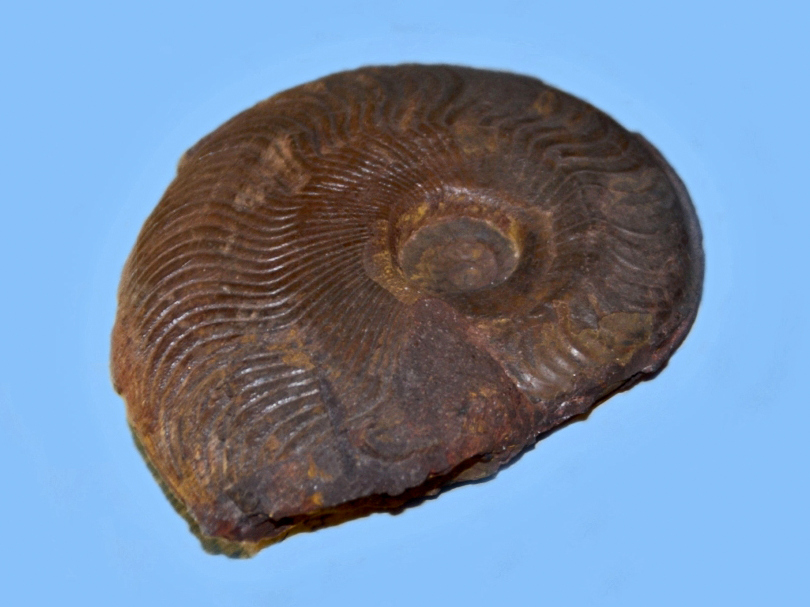
- Fossil shell of Harpoceras subplanatum from Isère (France), on display at Galerie de paléontologie et d'anatomie comparée in Paris

Scientific classification
- Kingdom: Animalia
- Phylum: Mollusca
- Class: Cephalopoda
- Subclass: †Ammonoidea
- Order: †Ammonitida
- Family: †Hildoceratidae
- Subfamily: †Harpoceratinae; Neumayr, 1875

Genera
- at least 9, see text

Synonyms
- Polyplectinae Venturi, 1981

= Harpoceratinae =

Harpoceratinae Temporal range: Upper Pliensbachian to lower Bajocian

Extinct subfamily of molluscs

Harpoceratinae is an extinct subfamily of cephalopods belonging to the family Hildoceratidae. Ammonites of this subfamily had involute and compressed shells with strong keels. Keel might be rarely missing, but this is considered to be an abnormality. This has been observed both in Cleviceras and Harpoceras and called as genus Monestieria, which is now known to be invalid (into this invalid genus were added also abnormal unkeeled specimens of genus Protogrammoceras). Another example is Pseudolioceras, whose unkeeled specimen was used as type for description of invalid genus Praehaploceras. Oxyconic forms of this subfamily (Polyplectus and Sphenarpites) does not have any keel. Ribs were single, but in some genera also bifurcating with shapes from sigmoidal to falcate. Sometimes, shell can have only striate ribs or is smooth (Sphenarpites and older specimens of Eleganticeras and Ovaticeras). Tubercules are rare. Dimorphism is known in some genera and it is observable mostly in size. Macrochons can be 4, to 6 times larger than microconchs. As an example, macroconchs of Pseudolioceras are more than 150mm in diameter, while adult microconchs are only 35-50mm. There are big size differences even within dimorphs. Specimens ca be 2, or sometimes even 3 times bigger than other specimens of same dimorph.

== Genera ==
At least 9 genera is considered to be members of this subfamily. This number can be increased, as some authors might consider valid some genera, which are by other authors considered to be synonyms of these 9. For example, Maconiceras is sometimes listed within this subfamily, while by other authors, it is considered to be a synonym of Harpoceras.

- Cleviceras Howarth, 1992 (sometimes considered as synonym of Eleganticeras)

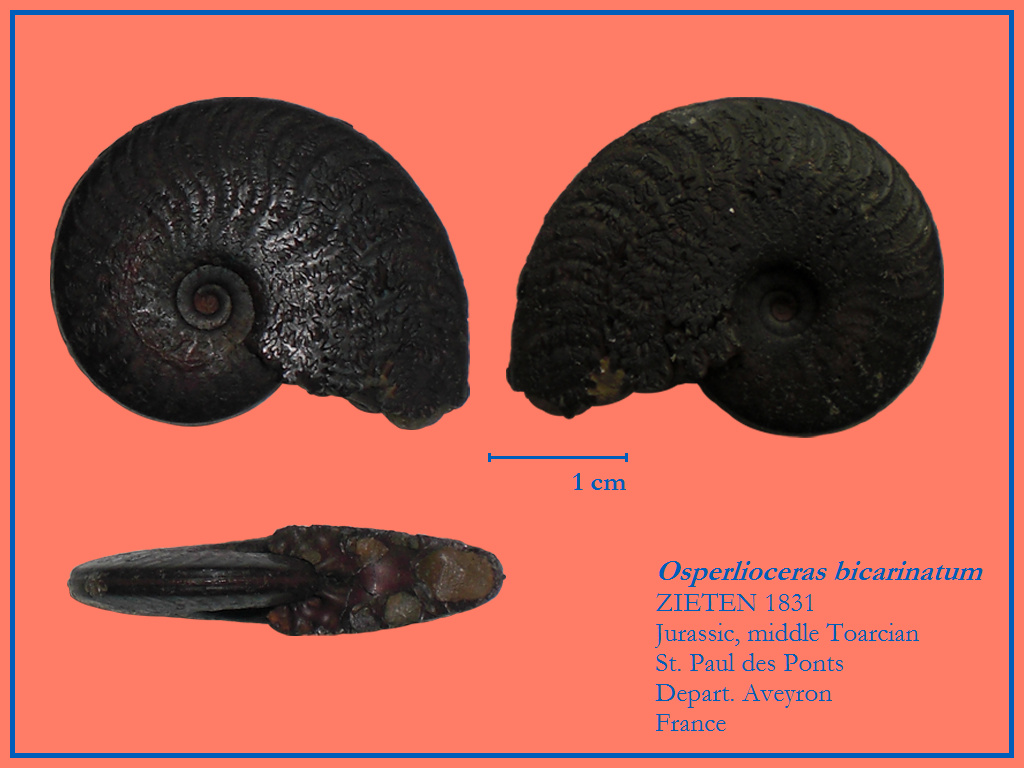
Osperleioceras bicarinatum Zieten 1831

- Eleganticeras Buckman, 1913
- Harpoceras Waagen, 1869
- Osperleioceras Krimholtz and Tazikhin, 1957
- Ovaticeras Buckman, 1918
- Polyplectus Buckman, 1890
- Pseudolioceras Buckman, 1889
- Sphenarpites Spath, 1936
- Taffertia Guex, 1973
- Tiltoniceras Buckman, 1913

Sometimes, more genera is referred to this subfamily, as some authors does not recognize validity of subfamily Protogrammoceratinae. Neolioceratoides, which has been included within Protogrammoceratinae and was also considered to be a synonym of Lioceratoides is now member of Hildoceratinae, which is reason why it is not listed below. This would include genera:

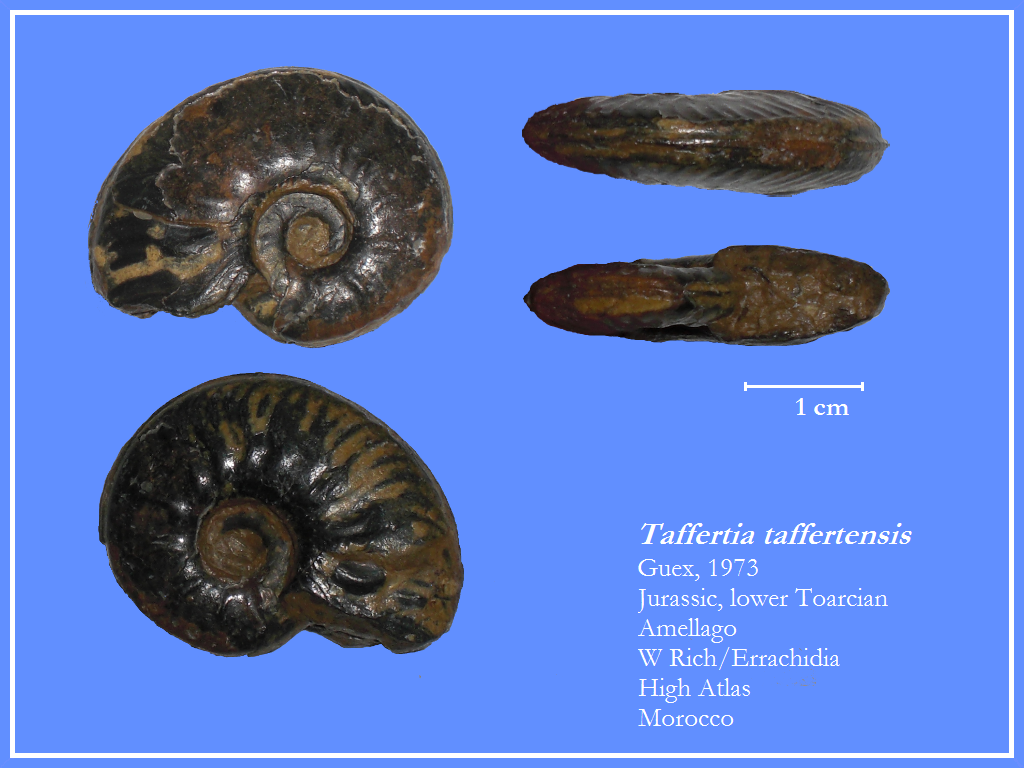
Taffertia taffertensis Guex 1973

- Protogrammoceras Spath, 1913
- Fuciniceras Haas, 1913
- Lioceratoides Spath, 1919

In 1981 a new subfamily has been erected and named Polyplectinae, which is sometimes considered to be a synonym of Harpoceratinae, but sometimes it is still used as valid taxa. Following genera are part of this subfamily:

- Polyplectus Buckman, 1890
- Praepolyplectus Venturi, 1981 (synonym of Polyplectus)

== Distribution ==
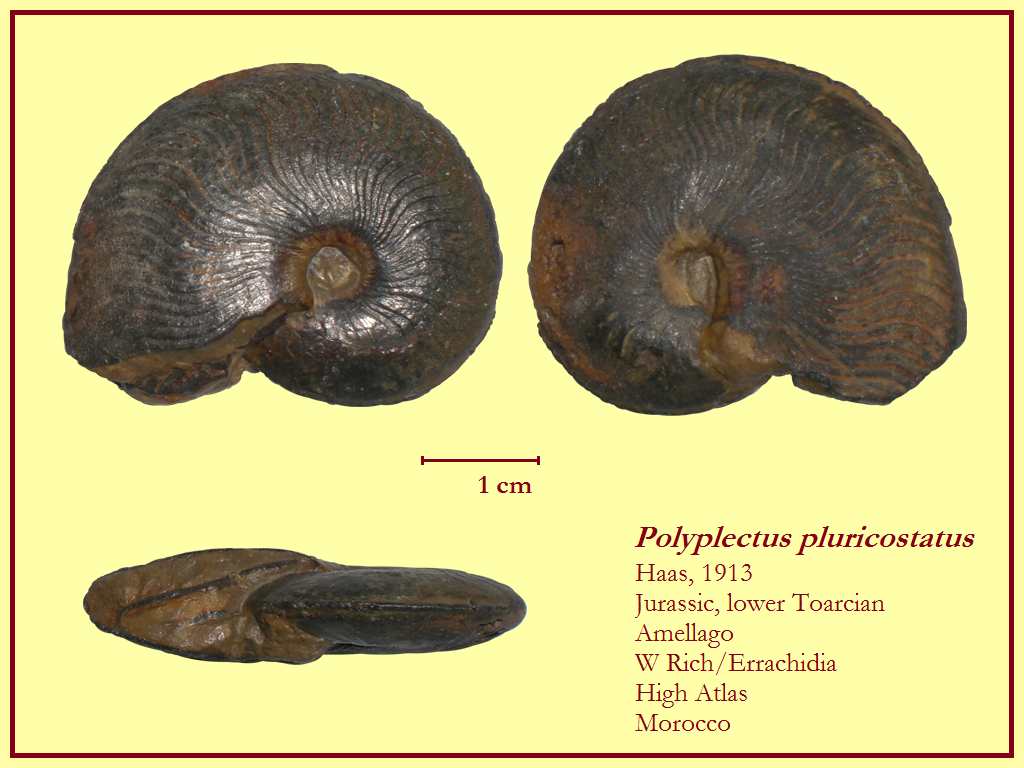
Polyplectus pluricostatus Haas 1913

Fossils of this subfamily have been found in the layers of upper Pliensbachian - lower Bajocian age. Distribution for subfamily is worldwide. All genera have been found in northern hemisphere, but only fossils of Harpoceras, Osperleioceras and Polyplectus comes also from southern hemisphere.

== Timeline and evolution ==
If Protogrammoceratinae shall be considered a valid subfamily, then Harpoceratinae might be of polyphyletic origin with at least 2 main lineages, both evolving from Protogrammoceratinae. First one started in upper Pliensbachian (Spinatum zone) when Tiltoniceras evolved from Lioceratoides, or Protogrammoceras. In Toarcian, during lower part of Exaratum subzone of Falciferum zone it evolved into Eleganticeras, which soon gave rise to Cleviceras. Polyplectus evolved from this genera.

Second lineage originated from Protogrammoceras, which has been predecessor for Harpoceras. Three genera evolved from this genus - Osperleioceras (from Harpoceras subplanatum), Ovaticeras (from Harpoceras falciferrum) and Pseudolioceras (probably also from Harpoceras falciferrum). Pseudolioceras is the only known member of this subfamily that lived also in middle Jurassic. Last common ancestor of both these lineages might have been Protogrammoceras that lived in Spinatum zone of Pliensbachian or sooner. Some authors (Knyazev et al., 2007) does not recognize validity of Cleviceras and place its species still in Harpoceras, while they considers Harpoceras falciferrum to be descended from Harpoceras exaratum (in most of recent literature is this species member of genus Cleviceras). Origin of the remaining 2 genera is probably unknown. Taffertia lived in Falciferrum zone of early Toarcian (maybe only in Exaratum subzone). Sphenarpites is known from single specimen that comes from early Toarcian.

Approximate timeline of Harpoceratinae genera. Sphenarpites is not shown, as its occurrence in time is not exactly known (it is lower Toarcian). Taffertia might have died out in Exaratum subzone which, if true, would mean it would have only about 1/3 of existence time.
