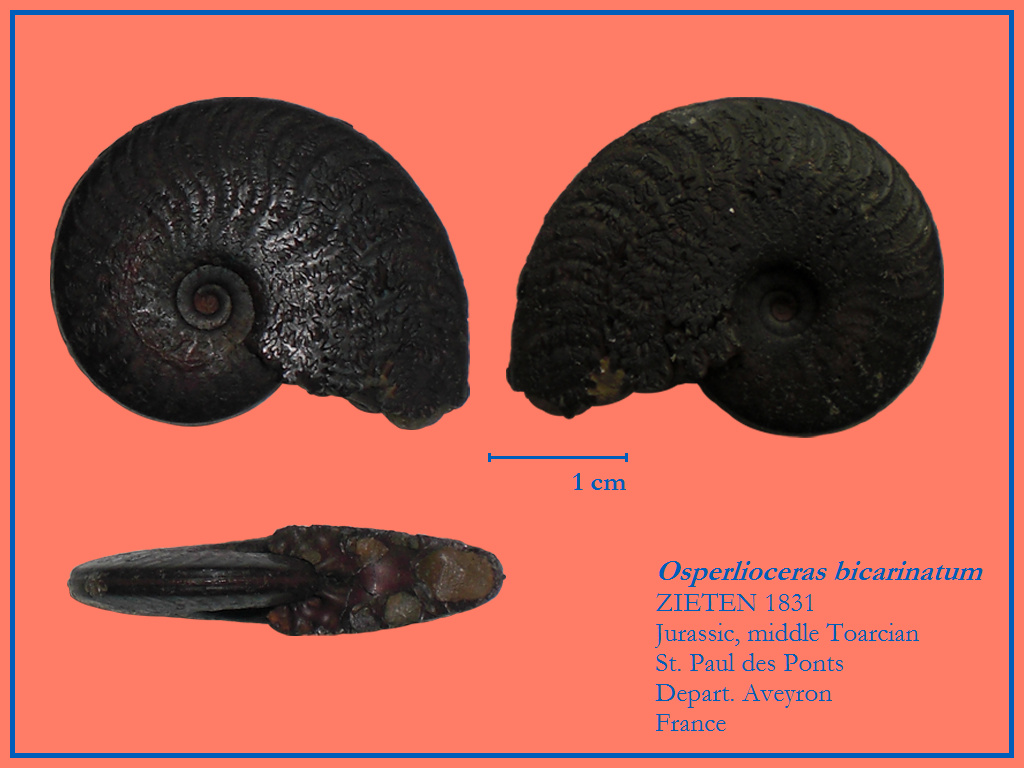
- Fossil shell of Osperleioceras bicarinatum from St. Paul des Ponts (France), part of private collection

Scientific classification
- Domain: Eukaryota
- Kingdom: Animalia
- Phylum: Mollusca
- Class: Cephalopoda
- Subclass: †Ammonoidea
- Order: †Ammonitida
- Family: †Hildoceratidae
- Subfamily: †Harpoceratinae
- Genus: †Osperleioceras; Krimholtz in Krimholtz and Tazikhin, 1957

Type species
- Pseudolioceras beauliziense Monestier, 1921

Subgenera
- Osperleioceras (Osperleioceras) Krimholtz, 1957; Osperleioceras (Pseudopolyplectus) Mattéi, 1969

Synonyms
- Pseudopolyplectus Mattei, 1969; Osperlioceras Guex, 1972

= Osperleioceras =

Osperleioceras Temporal range: Early - Late Toarcian

Genus of molluscs (fossil)

Osperleioceras is an extinct genus of cephalopod belonging to the family Hildoceratidae. These cephalopods existed in the Jurassic period, during Toarcian stage. Its fossils were found in Europe and South America. First species of this genus, Osperleioceras bicarinatum has evolved in what is now France from Harpoceras subplanatum.

== Description ==
Genus is similar to Harpoceras, but it is more involute and its whorl section is more triangular. Greatest width is near umbilicus. Flat whorl sides are converging to a flat narrow venter. It has strong keel, but there might be also slight ventro-lateral keels. Falcoid ribs are strongly projecting near venter. Suture line is highly incised, ornate and has many auxiliary saddles.

== Systematic ==
Systematic of this genera is not stable and some different opinions can be found in the literature. These differences arose around the status of genus Pseudopolyplectus Mattei, 1969. Sometimes, this genus is considered to be separate. Other times, this genus is considered tu be just a subgenus of Osperleioceras. The last opinion on the status of Pseudopolyplectus is, that this is a synonym of Osperleioceras. Differences among supposed subgenera are described below, but as some species have not been mentioned by authors considering validity of genus/subgenus Pseudopolyplectus as valid, in the list of species is this division avoided.

=== Osperleioceras (Osperleioceras) ===
This subgenus is characterized by preserving its ancestral sigmoid ribbing, which is very sparse through at least most of its ontogeny. Type species is Pseudolioceras beauliziense (= Osperleioceras (Osperleioceras) beauliziense). Other species include O. (O.) rivierense, O. (O.) reynesi, O. (O.) authelini and O. (O.) subcostulatum.

=== Osperleioceras (Pseudopolyplectus) ===
Juvenile stage of O. (Pseudopolyplectus) is sparsely ribbed by sigmoid ribs. At about 15 mm diameter, ribs are becoming fine and tight. As a type species has been chosen Ammonites bicarinatum (= Osperleioceras (Pseudopolyplectus) bicarinatum). Other members are O. (P.) loeve and O. (P.) subtile. To genus Pseudopolyplectus has been also added species P. nadorense, P. subexaratus, P. rivierense and P. reynesi, which can then be considered members of this subgenus. But last 2 are in other literature mentioned as part of O. (Osperleioceras).

=== List of species ===
The following list of species might be incomplete:

- O. alternans Monestier, 1921 (= Harpoceras wunstorfi var. alternans)
- O. authelini Monestier, 1921 (= Pseudolioceras Authelini, Pseudogrammoceras authelini)
- O. beauliziense Monestier, 1921 (= Pseudolioceras beauliziense)
- O. bicarinatum Zieten, 1831 (= Ammonites bicarinatus, Harpoceras bicarinatum, Polyplectus bicarinatus)
- O. carezi Monestier, 1921 (= Pseudolioceras carezi)
- O. holzapfeli Schirardin, 1909 (= Pseudolioceras holzapfeli )
- O. lapparenti Monestier, 1921 (= Pseudolioceras lapparenti)
- O. loeve Gabilly, 1976 (= Esericeras? loeve, Harpoceras loeve)
- O. nadorense Elmi (= Pseudopolyplectus nadorense)
- O. pervinquieri Monestier, 1921 (= Harpoceras pervinquieri)
- O. reynesi Monestier, 1921 (= Pseudolioceras reynesi, Pseudogrammoceras reynesi, Pseudopolyplectus reynesi)
- O. rivierense Monestier, 1921 (= Pseudolioceras rivierense)
- O. seidlitzi Schirardin, 1909 (= Lioceras seidlitzi)
- O. subcostulatum Monestier, 1921 (= Harpoceras wunstorfi var. subcostulata, Pseudopolyplectus wunstorfi var. subcostulata)
- O. subexaratus Mattei (= Pseudopolyplectus subexaratus)
- O. subtile Schirardin, 1914 (= Harpoceras subtile)
- O. suessi Monestier, 1921 (= Pseudolioceras suessi)
- O. wunstorfi Monestier, 1921 (= Harpoceras wunstorfi, Pseudopolyplectus wunstorfi)
