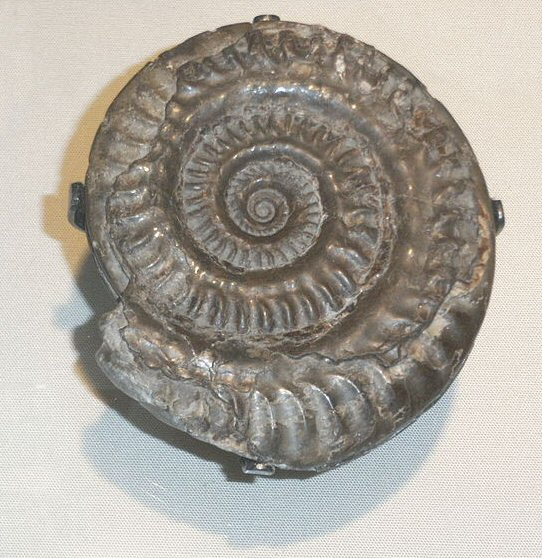
- Hildoceras bifrons from Whitby, England

Scientific classification
- Kingdom: Animalia
- Phylum: Mollusca
- Class: Cephalopoda
- Subclass: †Ammonoidea
- Order: †Ammonitida
- Family: †Hildoceratidae
- Genus: †Hildoceras
- Species: †H. bifrons

Binomial name
- †Hildoceras bifrons Bruguière, 1789

= Hildoceras bifrons =

Hildoceras bifrons Temporal range: Toarcian

Extinct species of ammonite

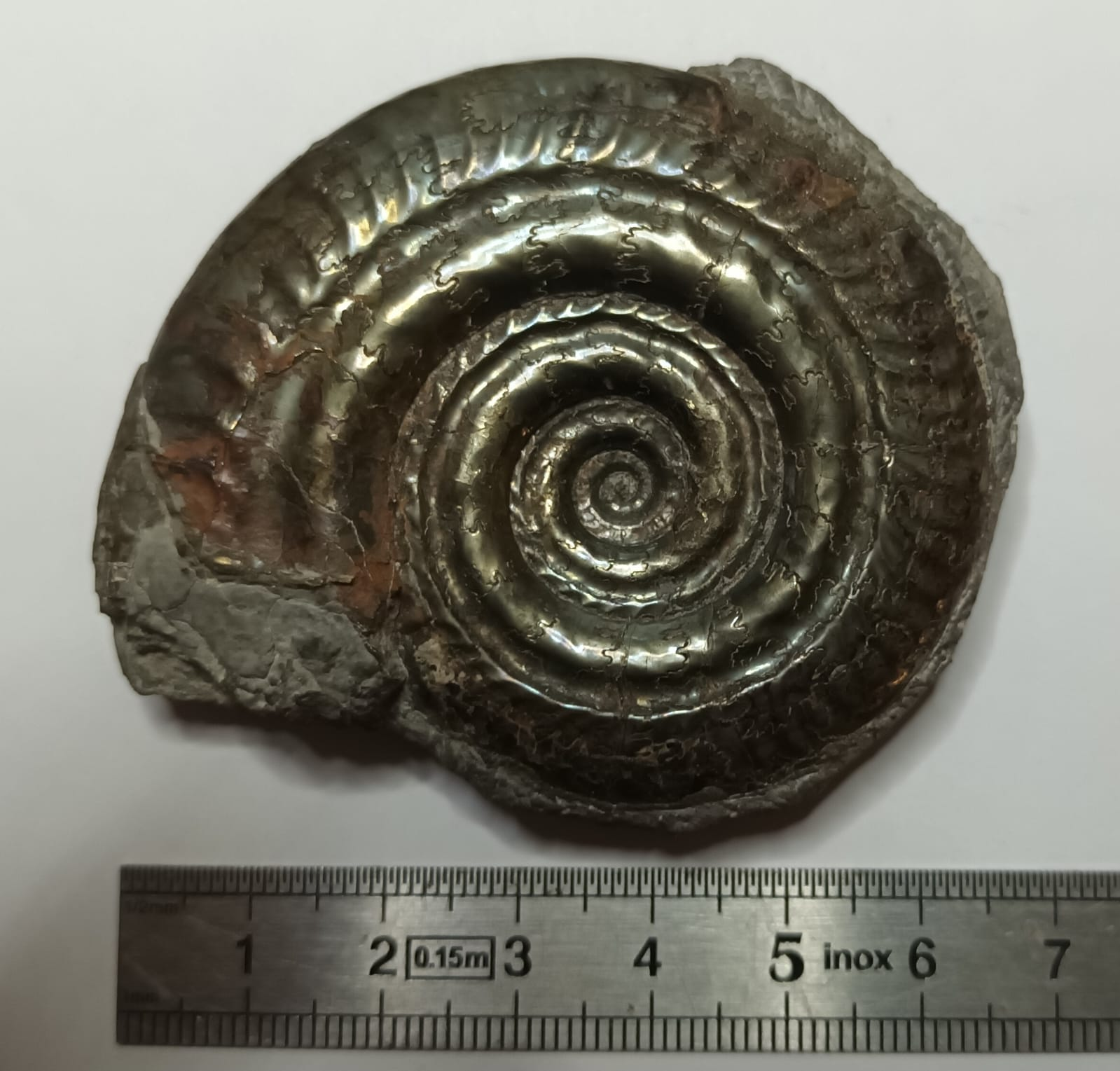
Hildoceras bifrons pyritized, Toarcian from Aveyron, France. Max Rouger Collection.

Hildoceras bifrons is an extinct species of ammonite in the family Hildoceratidae. It dates from about 175 million years ago in the Early Jurassic when it was both widespread and common. Fossils have been found in North Africa and Europe, including several regions of England.

== Origin of the name ==
The genus name has been given the name Hildoceras in honour of St. Hilda of Whitby (614-680 AD). Legend has it that this lady was required to found an abbey on the cliffs above Whitby, in the north of England. Finding the site to be infested by snakes (a devilish omen), she prayed to the Lord and the snakes coiled up and were turned to stone. She picked them up and threw them over the cliff, and that is why there are so many ammonite fossils in the rocks below the abbey. The specific name bifrons comes from Bifron, a demon, another name for the Roman god, Janus.

== Description ==
Hildoceras bifrons has a slender, flattened, deeply embossed spiral shell with dense transverse ribbing and a deep groove that runs parallel to the spiral. The umbilicus is convex and has gently sloping sides. The aperture is circular. The fossils come in two sizes, the macroconch (female) ranging in size from 95 to 175 millimetres (3.7 to 6.9 in) in diameter and the microconch (male) which ranges from 24 to 41 millimetres (0.94 to 1.61 in). When the animal was alive, the interior of the shell was divided into chambers which were partly filled with air for buoyancy. The soft parts of the body have not been preserved in the fossils known, but it is probable that Hildoceras bifrons was a predator and caught its prey with tentacles that projected from its aperture.

== Distribution ==
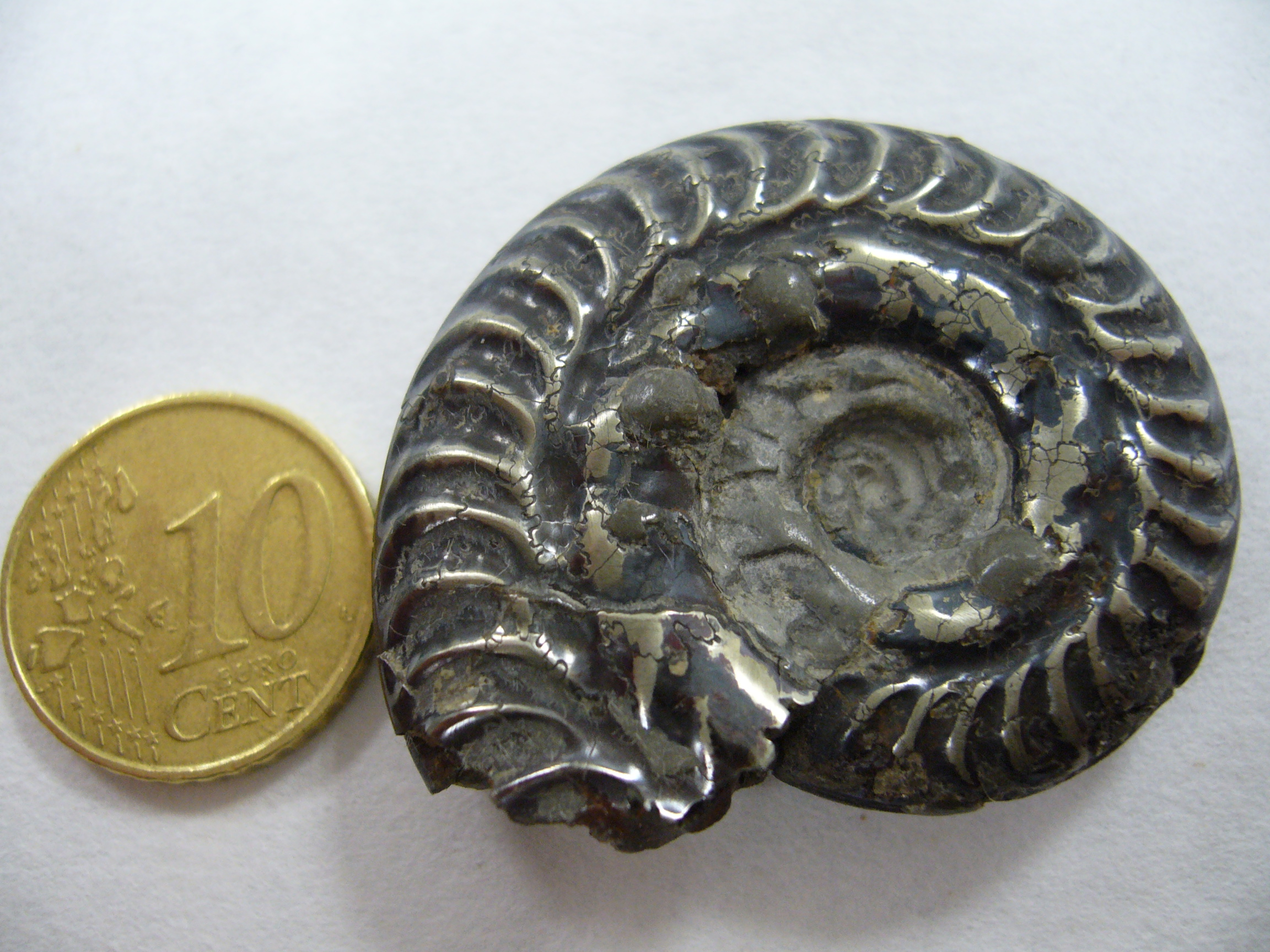
Hildoceras bifrons from Aveyron, France

Fossils of Hildoceras bifrons have been found in North Africa, the Caucasus Mountains, Europe and Eastern England. It is particularly associated with the fossil beds in the Whitby Mudstone Formation, Yorkshire, England. It is so characteristic of the strata in which it is found that it is used as an index fossil to help identify the geological period of the rocks. It dates back to the Toarcian in the Early Jurassic, some 184 to 175 million years ago.

== Biology ==
There has been much debate as to the mode of life and swimming ability of ammonites. Their closest living relatives, the nautiluses, are able to swim because their weight does not exceed their buoyancy, their apertures are suitably orientated and they have sufficient stability to maintain a vertical position. Careful examination of Hildoceras bifrons and some other ammonites makes it seem unlikely that they had a pelagic lifestyle and it is believed that they were primarily benthic animals living on the seabed.
