= Arctomercaticeras =

Arctomercaticeras Temporal range: Toarcian

Scientific classification
- Kingdom: Animalia
- Phylum: Mollusca
- Class: Cephalopoda
- Subclass: †Ammonoidea
- Order: †Ammonitida
- Family: †Hildoceratidae
- Genus: †Arctomercaticeras; Repin, 1968

Arctomercaticeras is an extinct genus of cephalopod belonging to the Ammonite subclass and the family Hildoceratidae that lived during the Early Jurassic (Toarcian stage) in the Arctic zone of Russia.
