= Parahildaites =

Parahildaites Temporal range: Toarcian

Scientific classification
- Kingdom: Animalia
- Phylum: Mollusca
- Class: Cephalopoda
- Subclass: †Ammonoidea
- Order: †Ammonitida
- Family: †Hildoceratidae
- Subfamily: †Hildoceratinae
- Genus: †Parahildaites; Blaison, 1967

Type species
- Hildaites sanderi Arkell, 1952

Genus of molluscs (fossil)

Parahildaites is genus of ammonites that lived during the lower Toarcian stage of early Jurassic, during Bifrons zone. It differs from Hildaites and Hildoceras by having smooth shell after reaching 4 cm in diameter. There is no spiral groove and on early whorls, there can be sigmoidal ribs or striae. Strong keel is bordered by flat areas or slight sulci. Its fossils were found in Saudi Arabia and Madagascar.
