= Sphenarpites =

Sphenarpites Temporal range: Toarcian

Scientific classification
- Kingdom: Animalia
- Phylum: Mollusca
- Class: Cephalopoda
- Subclass: †Ammonoidea
- Order: †Ammonitida
- Family: †Hildoceratidae
- Subfamily: †Harpoceratinae
- Genus: †Sphenarpites; Spath, 1936

Type species
- Sphenarpites hawkinsi Spath, 1936

Genus of mollusc (fossil)

Sphenarpites is an extinct genus of cephalopod belonging to the family Hildoceratidae. Only one specimen is known, which has been found in Kalat, Balochistan, in today's Pakistan. Its involute, oxycone shell has very small umbilicus and umbilical wall is smoothly rounded. Suture is reduced with 1 or 2 adventitious saddles and about 10 auxiliary saddles in external suture.
