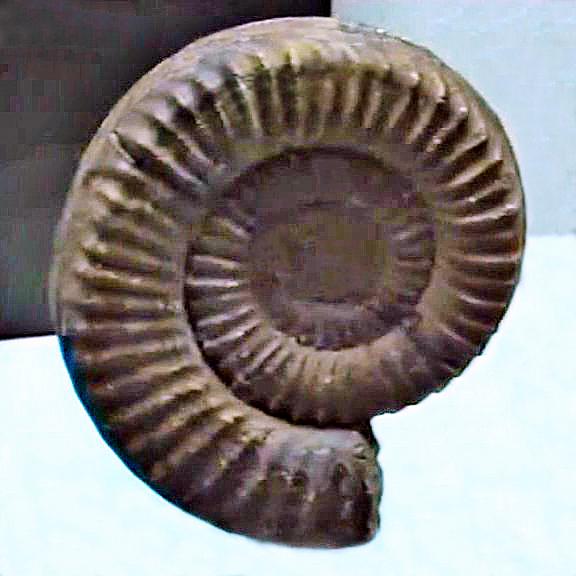
- Fossil of Mercaticeras species, from Luserna, Trento

Scientific classification
- Kingdom: Animalia
- Phylum: Mollusca
- Class: Cephalopoda
- Subclass: †Ammonoidea
- Order: †Ammonitida
- Family: †Hildoceratidae
- Subfamily: †Hildoceratinae
- Genus: †Mercaticeras; Buckman, 1913

Species
- See text

= Mercaticeras =

Mercaticeras Temporal range: Jurassic

Genus of molluscs (fossil)

Mercaticeras is an extinct genus of ammonites belonging to the family Hildoceratidae.

== Etymology ==
The genus name Mercaticeras derives from Michele Mercati (a Tuscan physician who lived in the 16th century, superintendent of the Vatican Botanical Gardens) and ceras = horn, therefore the genus name means horn of Mercati.

== Description ==
Mercaticeras shows a subquadratic section, sometimes wider than high. The shell is averagely evolute, with a spiral that grows more rapidly in the internal whirls. It is adorned by sturdy, clavate, simple ribs. The suture is simple.

== Fossil record ==
These ammonites lived in the Jurassic, Middle Toarcian age, Bifrons Zone to lower Variabilis/Gradatus Zone (age range: 182.0 to 175.6 million years ago).

Fossils of this genus can be found in Albania, Algeria, Austria, Bulgaria, Canada, France, Germany, Greece, Herzegovina, Hungary, Italy, Morocco, Portugal, Spain, Switzerland, Tunisia, Turkey.

== Species ==
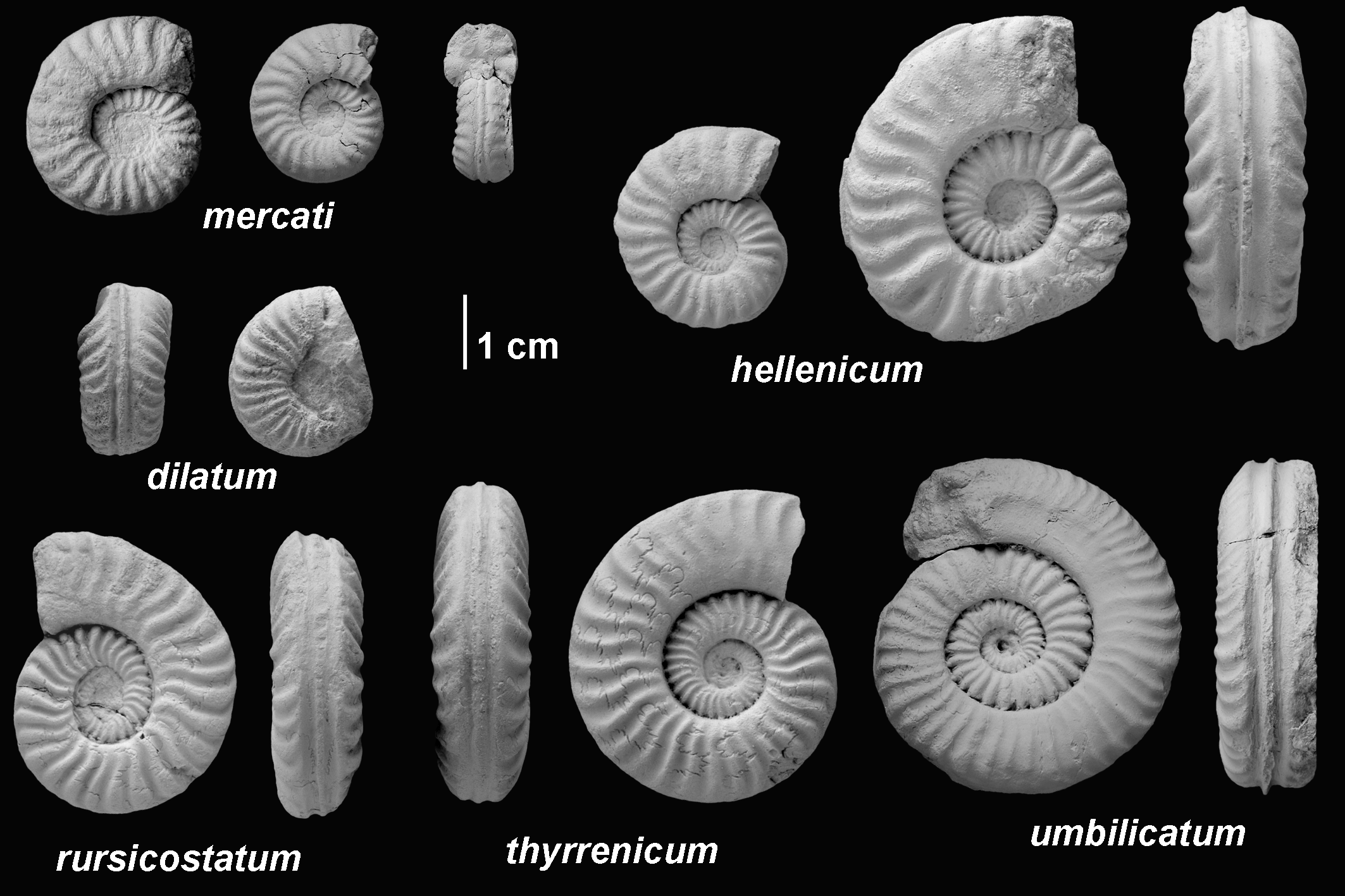
Mercaticeras species in the Middle Toarcian of the Gerecse Mts, Hungary. Collection Eötvös University, Budapest, Dep. Palaeontology

Species within this genus include:

- † Mercaticeras mercati (Hauer, 1856). Type species.
- † Mercaticeras dilatum (Meneghini, 1883)
- † Mercaticeras hellenicum (Renz, 1906)
- † Mercaticeras humeralis (Merla, 1933)
- † Mercaticeras rursicostatum (Merla, 1932)
- † Mercaticeras thyrrenicum (Fucini, 1905)
- † Mercaticeras umbilicatum (Buckman, 1913)

== Classification ==
The suprageneric classification has been discussed in the literature. Researchers of the Toarcian Mediterranean domain agree that Mercaticeras belongs to the subfamily Mercaticeratinae Guex, 1974 (Hildoceratidae) with genera Praemercaticeras Venturi, 1981, Pseudomercaticeras Merla, 1932, Merlaites Gabilly, 1974, Crassiceras Merla, 1932, and Pseudocrassiceras Rulleau et Jattiot, 2019.

== See also ==
- List of ammonite genera
