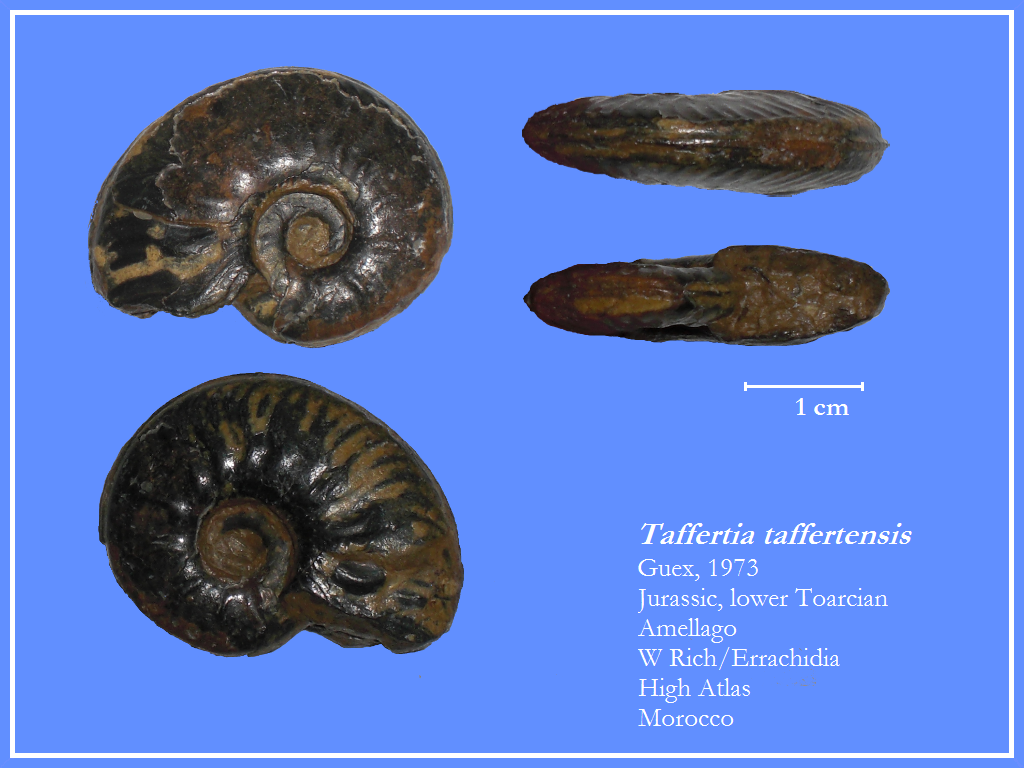
- Fossil shell of Taffertia taffertensis from High Atlas (Morocco), in personal collection

Scientific classification
- Kingdom: Animalia
- Phylum: Mollusca
- Class: Cephalopoda
- Subclass: †Ammonoidea
- Order: †Ammonitida
- Family: †Hildoceratidae
- Subfamily: †Harpoceratinae
- Genus: †Taffertia; Guex, 1973

Type species
- Taffertia taffertensis Guex, 1973

= Taffertia =

Taffertia Temporal range: Early Toarcian

Genus of molluscs (fossil)

Taffertia is an extinct genus of cephalopod belonging to the family Hildoceratidae. These cephalopods existed in the Jurassic period, during Toarcian age in the Falciferum zone and possibly only in Exaratum subzone. Its fossils were found in Canada, Morocco, Algeria and Italy.

== Description ==
Moderately involute, keeled, tectiform, sub-ogival shell with bold, regularly bifurcating ribs. It is similar to Pseudolioceras, but is more evolute and differs from other Harpoceratinae by having bifurcating ribs.
