= Praepolyplectus =

Praepolyplectus Temporal range: Pliensbachian–Toarcian

Scientific classification
- Kingdom: Animalia
- Phylum: Mollusca
- Class: Cephalopoda
- Subclass: †Ammonoidea
- Order: †Ammonitida
- Family: †Hildoceratidae
- Subfamily: †Harpoceratinae
- Genus: †Praepolyplectus; Venturi, 1981

Type species
- †Praepolyplectus forzanensis Venturi, 1981

Species
- †Praepolyplectus forzanensis Venturi, 1981; †Praepolyplectus epiroticus (Renz, 1925)

Genus of molluscs (fossil)

Praepolyplectus is an extinct genus of cephalopod belonging to the family Hildoceratidae. It is sometimes considered to be a synonym of Polyplectus. While it is currently not known from which species it has evolved, there are multiple theories about its origin. Formerly has been suggested, that it has evolved from Harpoceratinae, but possible predecessor can be also in genus Protogrammoceras. Perharps it can be Protogrammoceras meneghinii. Its fossils were found in Italy, Spain and Morocco.

This genus is very similar to Polyplectus, but it is more evolute and has less acute ventral area. Sutures has shorter ventral lobe and other lobes are less developed and also less numerous when approaching umbilical region. External saddle is less advanced than lateral saddle and is inclined and wide.
