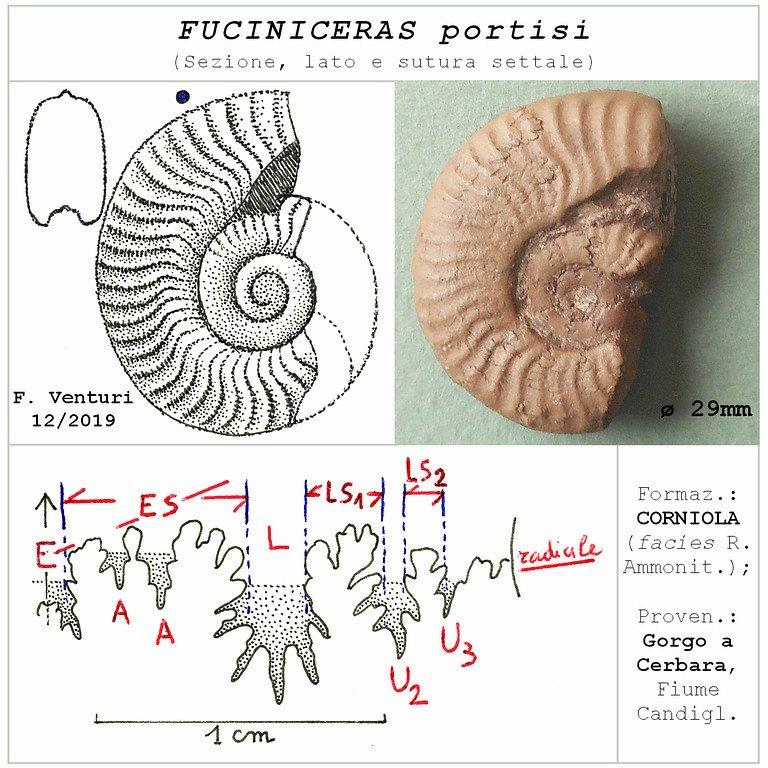
- Fuciniceras portisi

Scientific classification
- Kingdom: Animalia
- Phylum: Mollusca
- Class: Cephalopoda
- Subclass: †Ammonoidea
- Order: †Ammonitida
- Family: †Hildoceratidae
- Genus: †Fuciniceras; Haas, 1913

= Fuciniceras =

Fuciniceras Temporal range: Pliensbachian

Genus of molluscs (fossil)

Fuciniceras is an extinct cephalopod genus included in the ammonoid family Hildoceratidae, (order Ammonitida), that lived during the Pliensbachian stage of the Early Jurassic. The shell of Fuciniceras is generally small, evolute, and strongly ribbed.

== Bibliography ==
- Treatise on Invertebrate Paleontology, Part L (Ammonoidea). Geological Society of America and University of Kansas Press, 1957.
