= Neolioceratoides =

Neolioceratoides Temporal range: Pliensbachian–Toarcian

Scientific classification
- Kingdom: Animalia
- Phylum: Mollusca
- Class: Cephalopoda
- Subclass: †Ammonoidea
- Order: †Ammonitida
- Family: †Hildoceratidae
- Subfamily: †Hildoceratinae
- Genus: †Neolioceratoides; Cantaluppi, 1970

Type species
- Hildoceras (Lillia) hoffmanni Gemmellaro, 1885

Species
- N. hoffmanni Gemmellaro, 1885; N. durtalense Gabilly, 1976; N. avius Wiedenmayer, 1980; N. ballinensis Haas, 1913; N. beccarii Fucini, 1929; N. bellinii Gemmellaro, 1929; N. capuanai Fucini, 1929; N. ferrettii Wiedenmayer, 1980; N. languidus Fucini, 1929; N. lascivus Fucini, 1929; N. manzonii Gemmellaro, 1886; N. perplexus Fucini, 1929; N. rapisardii Fucini, 1929; N. recuperoi Fucini, 1929; N. rupelioi Fucini, 1929; N. schopeni Bettoni, 1900; N. sublythensis Haas, 1913; N. vergai Fucini, 1929; N. wrighti Gemmellaro, ????

Genus of molluscs (fossil)

Neolioceratoides is a genus of ammonites that lived during the Pliensbachian and Toarcian stages of the Early Jurassic. It has been considered to be a synonym of Lioceratoides, although cladistic analysis has shown that this genus is not only valid, but they even belong to different subfamilies, as Lioceratoides belongs to Harpoceratinae. Its fossils were found in Europe and northern Africa.

== Description ==
Ammonites belonging to this genus have evolute, moderately compressed shells. Whorl section is subtrapezoidal to subrectangular. Ventrum is tricarinate, but furrows are not very deep. Ribs are present even on living chamber and have sigmoidal shape. It differs from Lioceratoides by being more evolute and having thicker whorl section. Ribs are also more regularly arranged.
