= Phthitogomphus =

Phthitogomphus Temporal range: Early Jurassic, ~184.2–182.9 Ma

Scientific classification
- Kingdom: Animalia
- Phylum: Arthropoda
- Class: Insecta
- Order: Odonata
- Family: †Liassogomphidae
- Genus: †Phthitogomphus; Cowley, 1942
- Species: †P. angulatus

Binomial name
- †Phthitogomphus angulatus Cowley, 1942

Synonyms
- Paragomphus Handlirsch, 1939

Extinct genus of dragonfly

Phthitogomphus is an extinct genus of odonate from the Early Jurassic and it is known from the Sachrang Formation of Germany and Switzerland, and the Schistes bitumineux of Luxembourg.

The type species is Phthitogomphus angulatus and it was initially known as Paragomphus angulatus.
