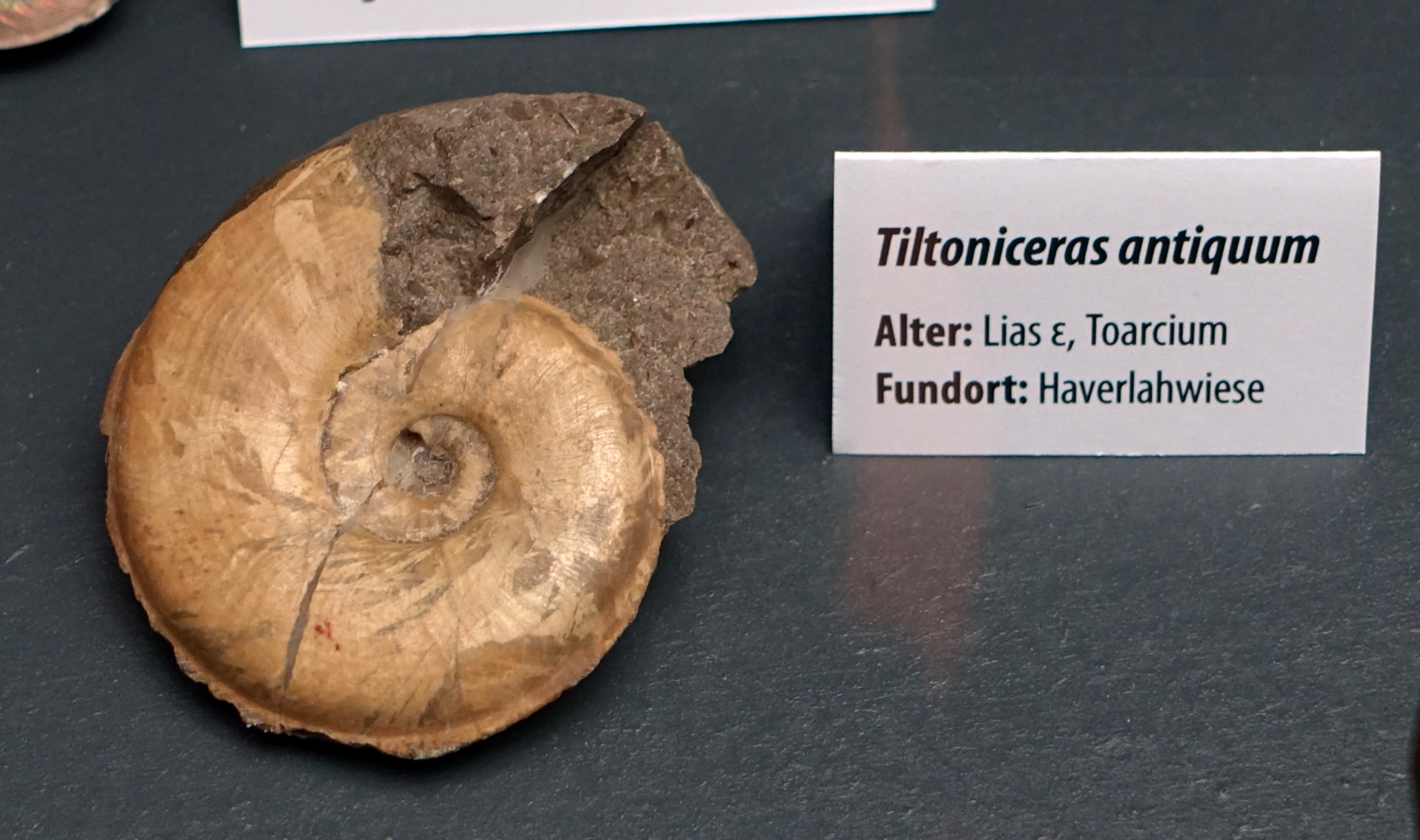
- T. antiquum from Haverlahwiese (Germany)

Scientific classification
- Kingdom: Animalia
- Phylum: Mollusca
- Class: Cephalopoda
- Subclass: †Ammonoidea
- Order: †Ammonitida
- Family: †Hildoceratidae
- Subfamily: †Harpoceratinae
- Genus: †Tiltoniceras; Buckman, 1913

Type species
- Tiltoniceras costatum Buckman, 1913

Species
- T. costatum Buckman, 1913; T. antiquum Wright, 1882; T. acutum Tate, 1875; T. capillatum Denckmann, 1887

Synonyms
- Pacificeras Repin, 1970

= Tiltoniceras =

Tiltoniceras Temporal range: Upper Pliensbachian — Early Toarcian

Extinct genus of cephalopods

Tiltoniceras is an extinct genus of cephalopod belonging to the family Hildoceratidae. These cephalopods existed in the Jurassic period, from upper Pliensbachian age, Spinatum zone until lower Toarcian, Tenuicostatum zone in what is now Europe, North America, and the Asian part of Russia. It is named after the village of Tilton-on-the-Hill, Leicestershire, where it was first identified.

== Description ==
Moderately involute to very involute shells, strongly keeled without sulci. They are compressed with rounded umbilical edge and nearly flat whorl sides. Ribs can be from strong, through fine, striate to smooth. They are gently sigmoidal to straight and on the venter they are strongly projected forward.
