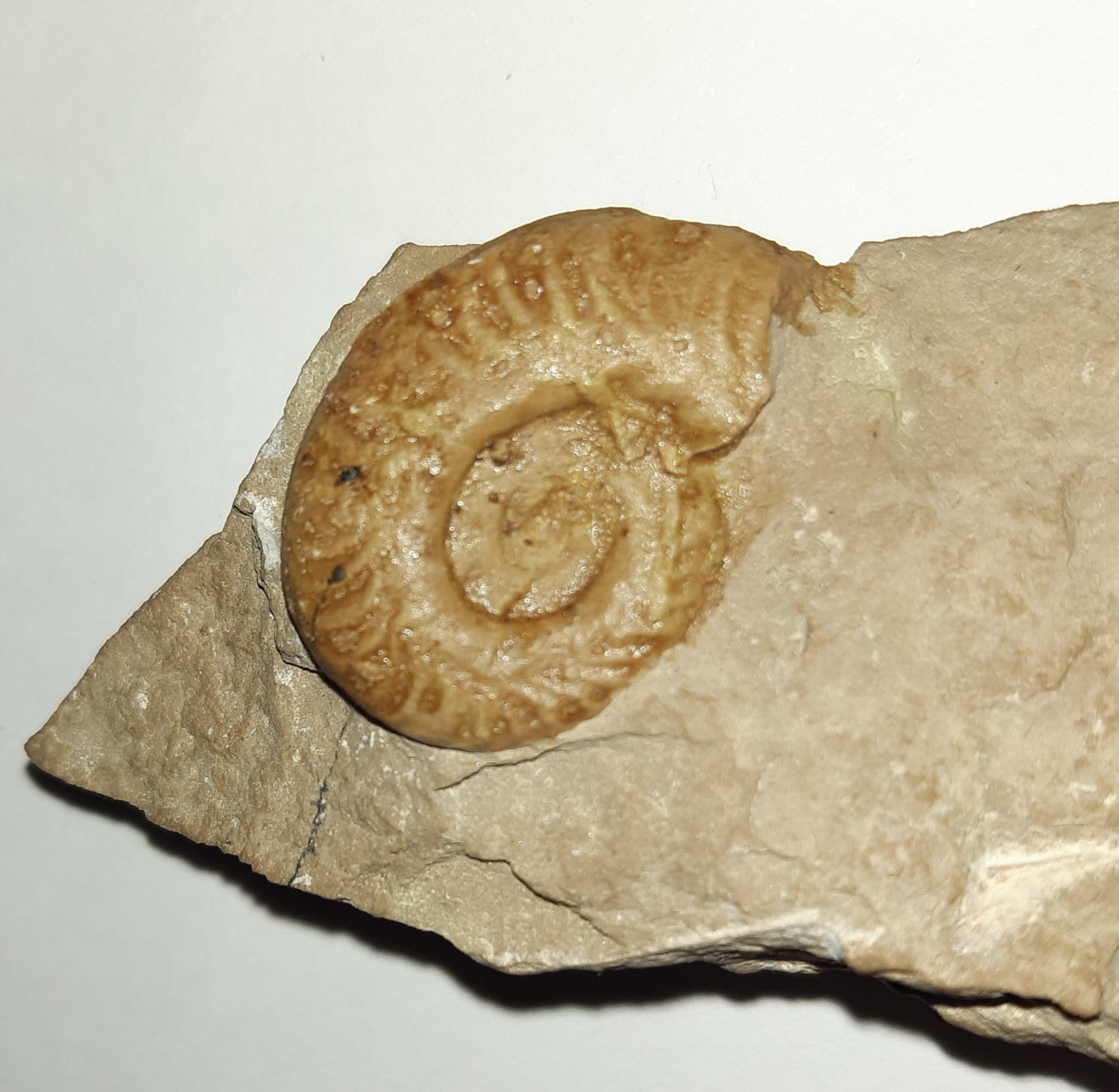
- Hildoceras sp.

Scientific classification
- Kingdom: Animalia
- Phylum: Mollusca
- Class: Cephalopoda
- Subclass: †Ammonoidea
- Order: †Ammonitida
- Family: †Hildoceratidae
- Subfamily: †Hildoceratinae
- Genus: †Hildoceras; Hyatt, 1876

Species
- See text

= Hildoceras =

Hildoceras Temporal range: Toarcian

Genus of molluscs (fossil)

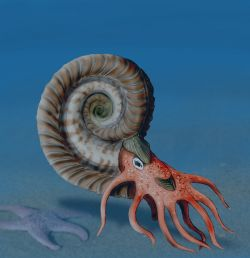
Recreation of Hildoceras

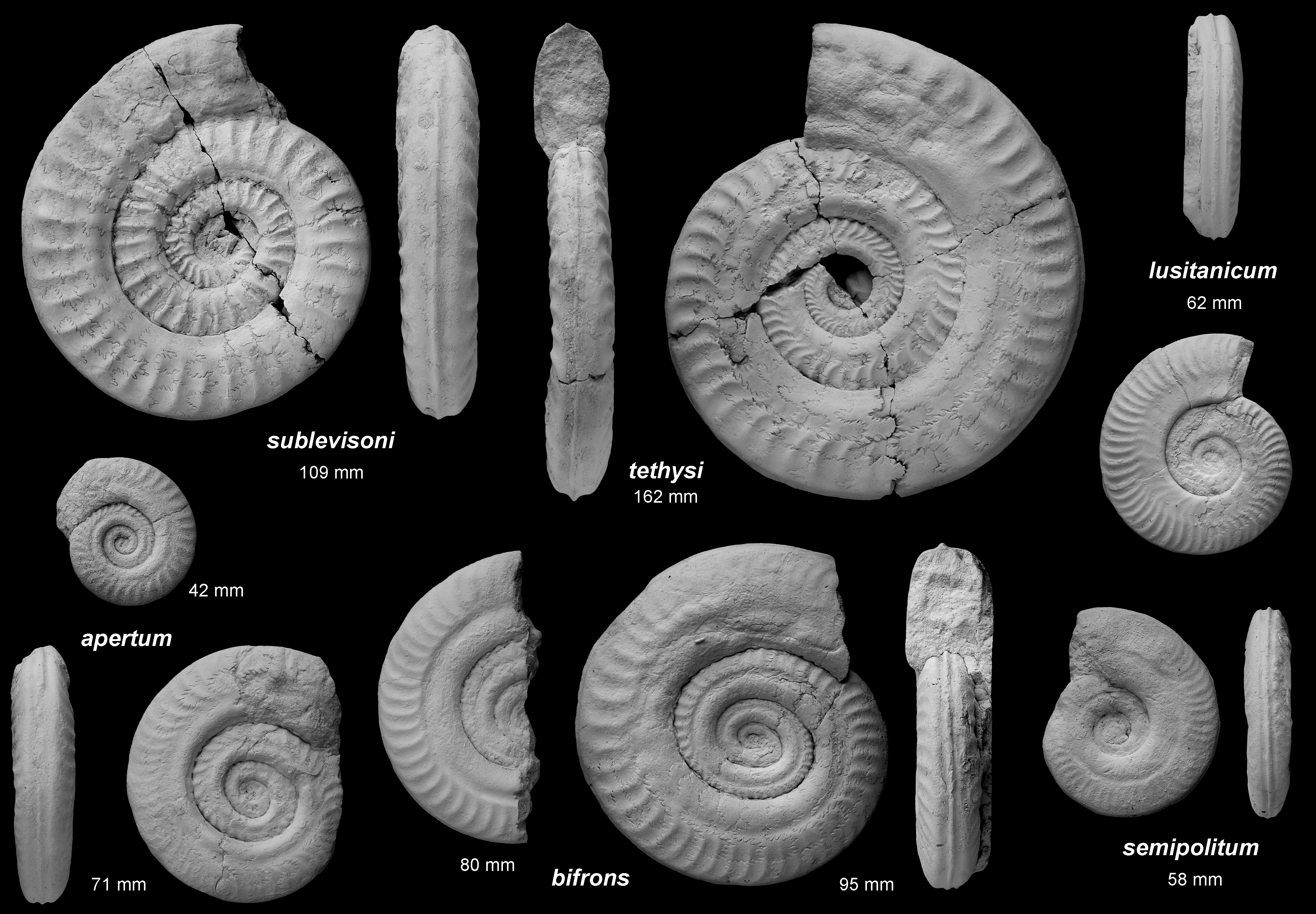
Hildoceras species from the Toarcian Bifrons Zone of the Gerecse Mts, Hungary. Collection Eötvös University, Dep. Palaeontology, Budapest.

Hildoceras is a genus of ammonite from the Jurassic period in the family Hildoceratidae. The shells are characterized by a narrow discoidal evolute shape, keeled venter, concave ribs along the outer flanks, and a shallow spiral groove running along smooth inner flanks. Whorls slightly overlap, cross sections are compressed. The ventral keel is bordered on either side by a shallow groove. The genus was named by Alpheus Hyatt after Saint Hilda in 1876.

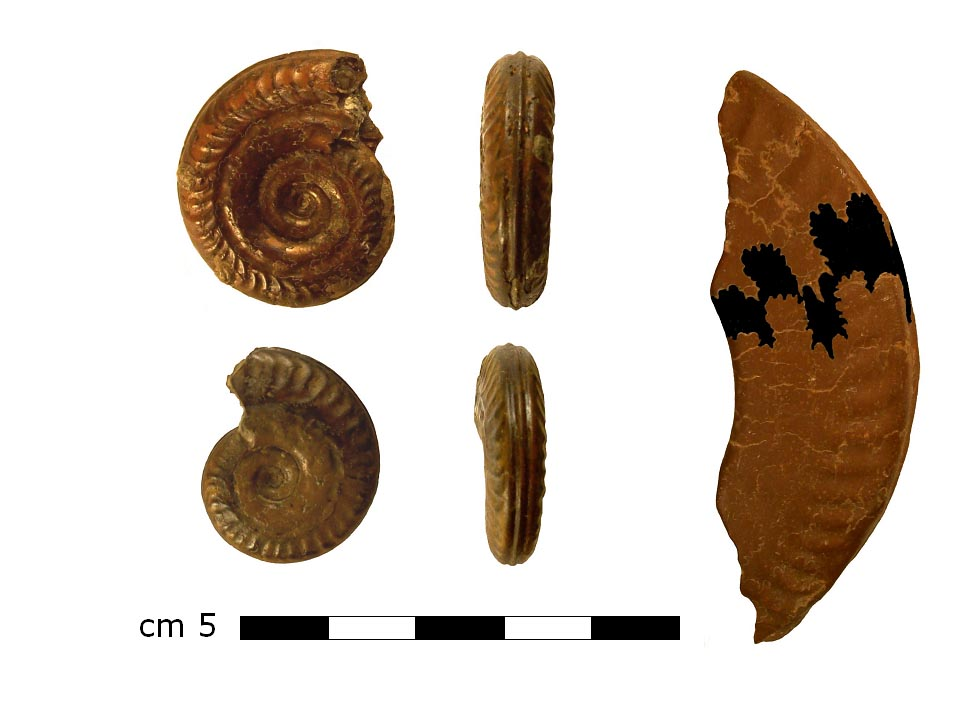
Hildoceras sp. morphological and external structural characteristics

== Distribution ==
Jurassic of Bulgaria, France, Germany, Hungary, Italy, Japan, Luxembourg, Serbia and Montenegro, Spain, the United Kingdom and Iran.

== Species ==
- Hildoceras ameuri Rulleau, Elmi & Thevenard, 2001
- Hildoceras apertum Gabilly, 1976
- Hildoceras bifrons (Bruguière, 1789)
- Hildoceras caterinii Merla, 1932
- Hildoceras crassum Mitzopoulos, 1930
- Hildoceras lusitanicum Meister, 1913
- Hildoceras semipolitum Buckman, 1902
- Hildoceras snoussi Elmi, 1977
- Hildoceras sublevisoni Fucini, 1919
- Hildoceras tethysi Géczy, 1967
