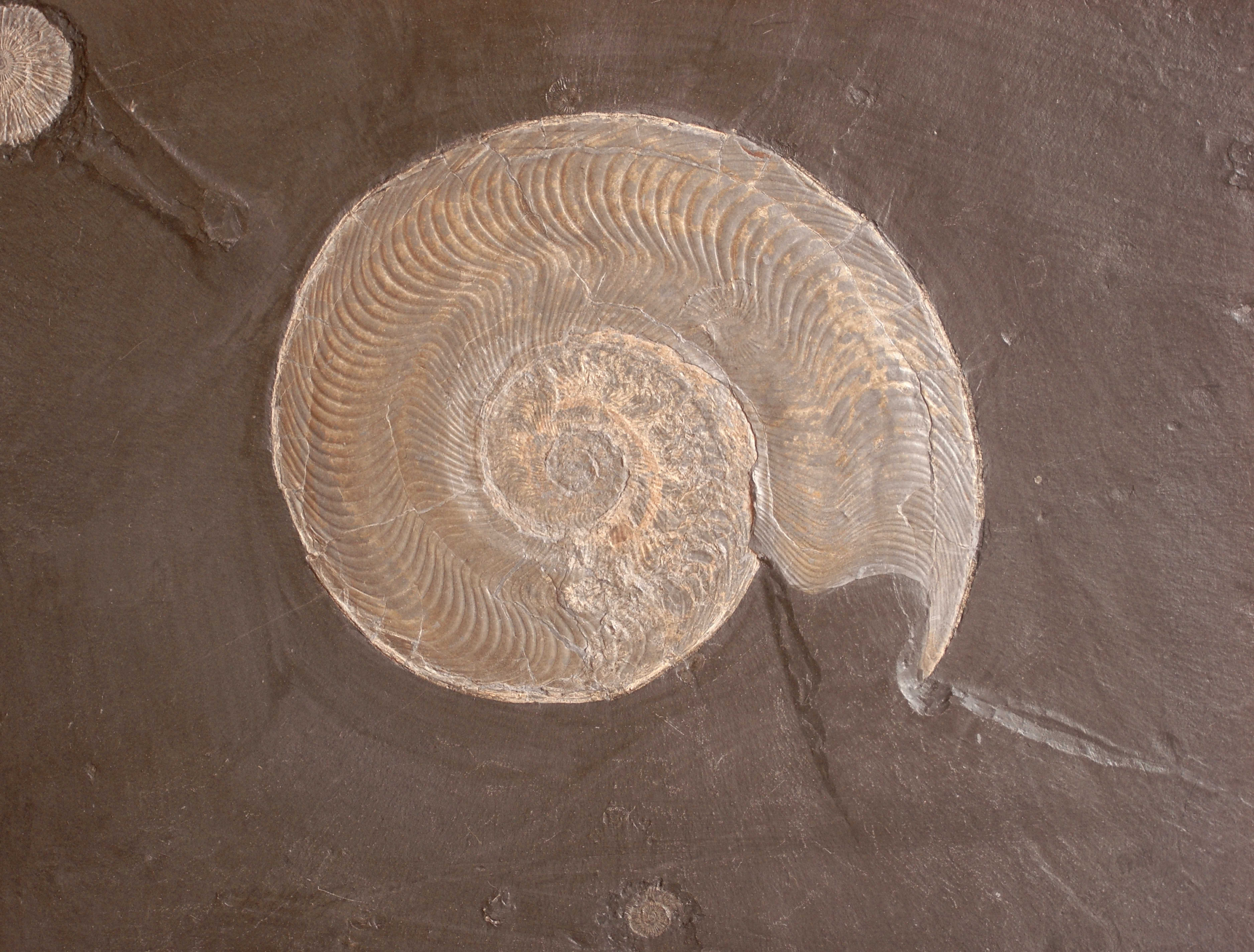
- Harpoceras falcifer from Posidonia Shale, Germany

Scientific classification
- Kingdom: Animalia
- Phylum: Mollusca
- Class: Cephalopoda
- Subclass: †Ammonoidea
- Order: †Ammonitida
- Family: †Hildoceratidae
- Subfamily: †Harpoceratinae
- Genus: †Harpoceras; Waagen, 1869

Type species
- Ammonites falcifer Sowerby, 1820

Species
- Harpoceras falciferum Sowerby, 1820; Harpoceras kisslingi Hug, 1898; Harpoceras lassum Buckman, 1927; Harpoceras mediterraneum Pinna, 1968; Harpoceras pseudoserpentinum Gabilly, 1973; Harpoceras rulleaui Bécaud, 2006; Harpoceras serpentinum Schlotheim, 1813; Harpoceras strangewaysi Sowerby, 1820; Harpoceras subexaratum Bonarelli, 1899; Harpoceras subplanatum Oppel, 1856; Harpoceras loeve Gabilly, 1975

Synonyms
- Falcifericeras Breistroffer, 1949; Gallitellia Venturi and Ferri, 2001; Glyptarpites Buckman, 1927; Harpoceratoides Buckman, 1909; Kolymoceras Dagis, 1970; Lioceras Bayle, 1878; Maconiceras Buckman, 1926; Phaularpites Buckman, 1928; Tardarpoceras Buckman, 1927

= Harpoceras =

Harpoceras Temporal range: Early Toarcian to Middle Toarcian

Genus of molluscs (fossil)

Harpoceras is an extinct genus of ammonite belonging to the family Hildoceratidae. These cephalopods existed in the Jurassic period, during the Toarcian age from the Falciferum zone to the Commune subzone of the Bifrons zone. They were fast-moving nektonic carnivores.

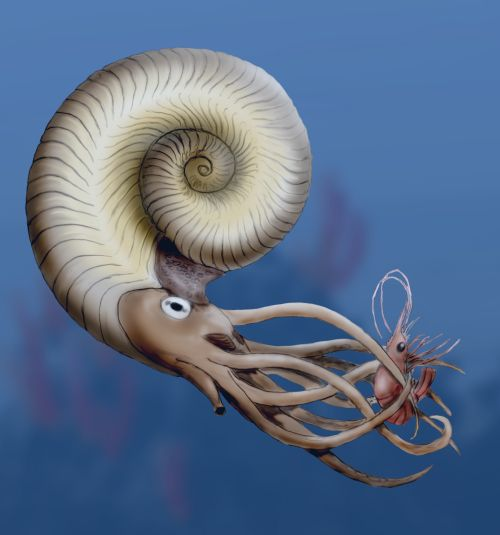
Artist's impression of Harpoceras

== Description ==
Shells of Harpoceras species show strong dimorphism in their size. While microconchs reach 24–51 mm in diameter, macroconchs shells width is 115–430 mm. They are moderately evolute to involute and compressed. Whorl sides are flat and there is strong keel. Ribs are falcoid or falcate and thus biconcave, strong and projected. Sometimes, ribs can be broad and flat topped on outer part of whorl and in some species they can be striate on inner part of whorl. Some species have midlateral groove, or series of undulating depressions on inner half of whorl.

== Distribution ==
Fossils of species within this genus have been found in the Lower Jurassic rocks of Europe, Northern Africa, Russia, Japan, Borneo, New Zealand, Indonesia, North and South America (Argentina; El Cholo and Los Molles Formations). Two species, Harpoceras serpentinum and Harpoceras falciferum, are index fossils used for stratigraphic correlation and dating of rocks of the Toarcian stage of the Lower Jurassic.
