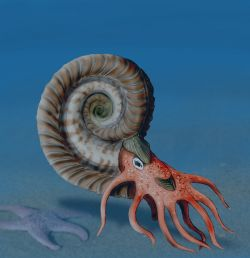
- Reconstruction of Hildoceras

Scientific classification
- Kingdom: Animalia
- Phylum: Mollusca
- Class: Cephalopoda
- Subclass: †Ammonoidea
- Order: †Ammonitida
- Family: †Hildoceratidae
- Subfamily: †Hildoceratinae; Hyatt, 1867

Genera
- See text

Synonyms
- Mercaticeratinae Guex, 1973

= Hildoceratinae =

Hildoceratinae Temporal range: Upper Pliensbachian to upper Toarcian

Extinct subfamily of molluscs

Hildoceratinae is an extinct subfamily of cephalopods belonging to the family Hildoceratidae. Ammonites of this subfamily had shells with elliptical or quadrate whorl sections with keeled or tricarinate, bisulcate venters. Ribs were variable, from falcate to strongly angled and from fine to strong. They can be interrupted by a spiral groove in the midlateral part of the shell. While some species can be smooth, strongly ribbed ones can have tubercules. Microconchs have short lappets that are in their shape similar to the shape of growth lines in a spiral midlateral groove.

== Genera ==
- Hildaites Buckman, 1921
- Orthildaites Buckman, 1923
- Cingolites Sassaroli et Venturi, 2010
- Hildoceras Hyatt, 1867
- Urkutites Géczy, 1967
- Parahildaites Blaison, 1967
- Mercaticeras Buckman, 1913
- Hildaitoides Hillebrandt, 1987
- Atacamiceras Hillebrandt, 1987
- Neolioceratoides Cantaluppi, 1970

=== Alternative classification ===
Genera Praemercaticeras Venturi, 1981; Mercaticeras Buckman, 1913; Pseudomercaticeras Merla, 1932; Merlaites Gabilly, 1974; Crassiceras Merla, 1932; and Pseudocrassiceras Rulleau et Jattiot, 2019, have also been classified as belonging to a separate subfamily Mercaticeratinae Guex, 1974.

== Distribution ==
Members of this subfamily lived from the upper Pliensbachian to upper Toarcian stages of the early Jurassic. Distribution has been worldwide.
