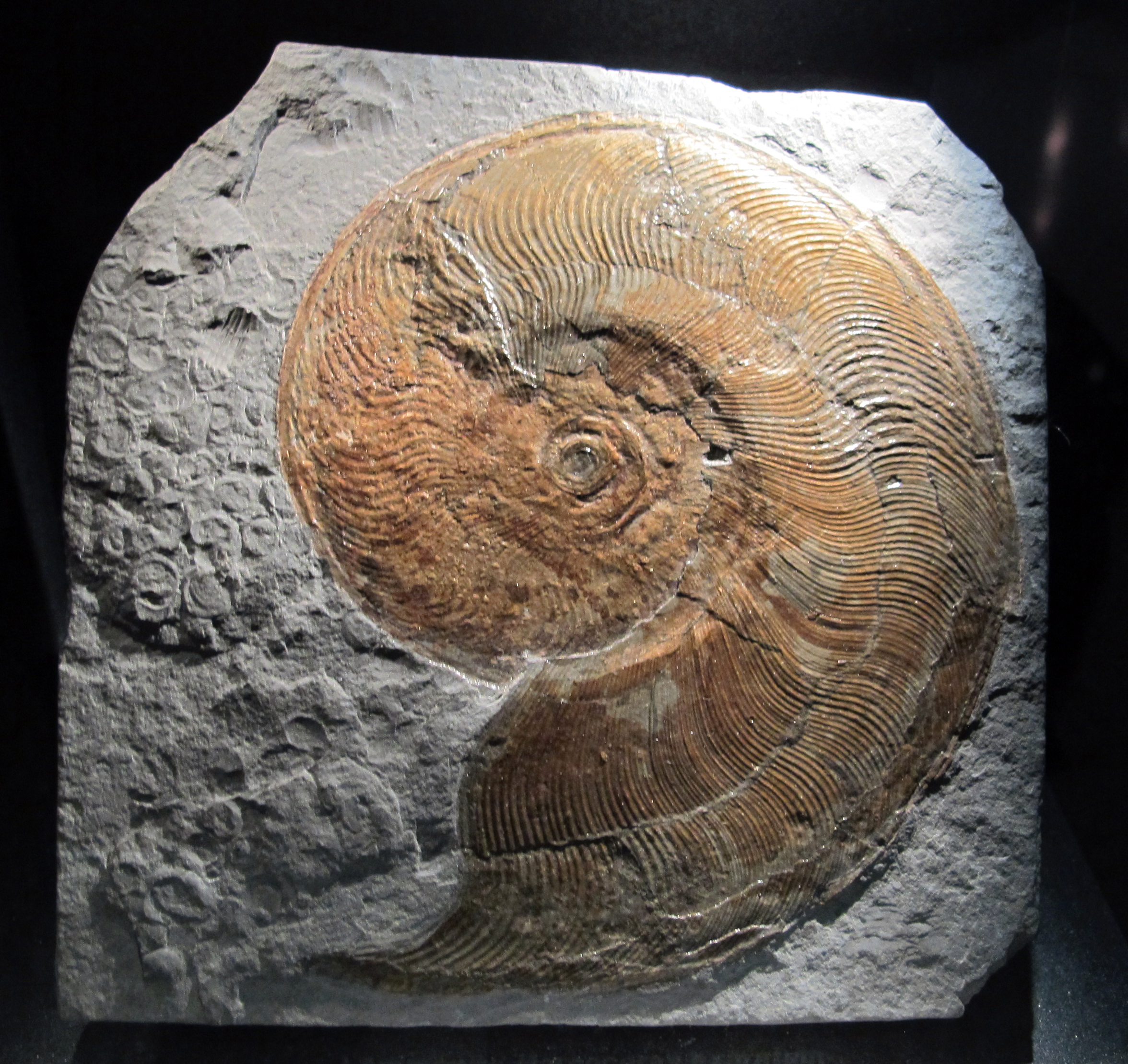
- Fossil Harpoceras exaratum

Scientific classification
- Kingdom: Animalia
- Phylum: Mollusca
- Class: Cephalopoda
- Subclass: †Ammonoidea
- Order: †Ammonitida
- Superfamily: †Hildoceratoidea
- Family: †Hildoceratidae; Hyatt, 1867

Subfamilies
- Arieticeratinae; Bouleiceratinae; Grammoceratinae; Harpoceratinae; Hildoceratinae; Mercaticeratinae; Leukadiellinae; Protogrammoceratinae; Phymatoceratinae

= Hildoceratidae =

Hildoceratidae Temporal range: Pliensbachian to Bajocian 189.6–170.5 Ma

Extinct family of molluscs

Hildoceratidae is a family of ammonoid cephalopods from the Lower Jurassic, lower Pliensbachian (Jamesoni zone) to lower Bajocian (maybe even upper Bajocian) substages, generally with strongly ribbed, involute shells. They are combined with the Hammatoceratidae (= Phymatoceratidae), Graphoceratidae, and Sonniniidae to make up the Hildoceratoidea.

As many as seven subfamilies have been included in late 20th century, principle being the Arieticeratinae, Harpocertinae, Hildoceratinae, to which the Treatise, Part L, adds the Bouleiceratinae, Grammoceratinae, and Tmetoceratinae. Donovan et al. (1981) includes the same and adds the Leioceratinae which the older Treatise includes in the Graphoceratidae. Currently Leioceratinae are again members of Graphoceratidae and into Hildoceratidae are added newly established subfamily Leukadiellinae and Protogrammoceratinae, which has been by Donovan et al. (1981) considered as part of Harpoceratinae.

The Hildoceratidae are derived from the Polymorphitidae, a family in the Eoderoceratoidea, and gave rise to the Hammatoceratidae and Graphoceratidae.

Approximate timeline of Hildoceratidae subfamilies with their evolutionary relationships.
