= Marne de Flize =

Geologic formation in France

- Stratigraphic range: early Toarcian; ~183–182 Ma
- Type: Formation

Lithology
- Primary: Shale
- Other: Limestone

Location
- Coordinates: 49.8°N 4.7°E
- Approximate paleocoordinates: 38.2°N 13.7°E
- Region: Champagne-Ardenne
- Country: France

Type section
- Named for: Flize marl
- Marne de Flize (France)

The Marne de Flize is a geologic formation in France. It preserves fossils dating back to the Toarcian stage of the Jurassic period.

== Description ==
The finely bedded blue-grey shales contain limestone lenses up to one metre in thickness La Croisette. The Marne de Flize is referred to the early Toarcian (Tenuicostatum and Serpentinum zones according to Mouterde, 1980). It is therefore coeval with the Posidonia Shale of southern Germany.

== Fossil content ==
The following fossils were reported from the formation:

=== Vertebrates ===
Reptiles

- cf. Dorygnathus sp.
- Ichthyosauria indet.

Fish

- Osteichthyes indet.

=== Invertebrates ===
- Crustacea indet.
- Bivalvia indet.
- Teuthidea indet.

Ammonites

- Dactylioceras sp.
- Harpoceras sp.

=== Flora ===
- Plantae indet.

== See also ==
- List of fossiliferous stratigraphic units in France
- Toarcian turnover
- Toarcian formations
- Marne di Monte Serrone, Italy
- Calcare di Sogno, Italy
- Posidonia Shale, Lagerstätte in Germany
- Ciechocinek Formation, Germany and Poland
- Krempachy Marl Formation, Poland & Slovakia
- Lava Formation, Lithuania
- Budoš Limestone, Montenegro
- Azilal Group, North Africa
- Whitby Mudstone, England
- Fernie Formation, Alberta and British Columbia
- Poker Chip Shale
- Whiteaves Formation, British Columbia
- Navajo Sandstone, Utah
- Los Molles Formation, Argentina
- Mawson Formation, Antarctica
- Kandreho Formation, Madagascar
- Kota Formation, India
- Cattamarra Coal Measures, Australia
