= Borucice Formation =

Geologic formation in Poland

- Stratigraphic range: Middle-Late Toarcian; ~178–174 Ma
- Type: Geological formation
- Unit of: Kamienna Group
- Sub-units: Idzikowice Tracksite
- Underlies: Kościelisko beds
- Overlies: Zagaje Formation; Belowice Formation; Komorowo Formation; Olsztyn Formation; Drzewica Formation; Blanowice Formation; Ciechocinek Formation
- Area: Polish Basin
- Thickness: 120 m (390 ft)

Lithology
- Primary: Coarse-fine-grained sandstone
- Other: Mudstone

Location
- Country: Poland

Type section
- Named for: after the village of Borucice in Kujawy
- Named by: Stefan Zbigniew Różycki (as Borucice Series)
- Year defined: 1958
- Borucice Formation (Poland) Original Outcrop Location

The Borucice Formation, also known in older literature as the Borucice Series, is a Jurassic (Middle-Late Toarcian) geologic formation that extends to nearly whole of Poland. This formation represents the last sequence of the lower Jurassic in Poland, recovering the depositional sequences IX and X, and may even recover lowermost parts of the first Middle Jurassic sequence. It represents mostly a series of alluvial (braided or meandering channel) depositional systems with subordinate intervals of deltaic deposits. Dinosaur Tracks are among the fossils that have been recovered from the formation. Most of the sediments of the Polish realm come from deltaic, fluvial and marine deposits. It mainly consists of light whitish-grey, fine grained sandstones interbedded by clay containing plant detritus and minute fragments of coal. It also has dark grey mudstones with marine lamellibranches and an Upper Lias microfauna. Its main equivalents are the Jurensismergel Formation of Germany, upper part of the Rya Formation (Southern Sweden)and the uppermost Sorthat Formation (Bornholm). There are also coeval abandoned informal units in Poland: Upper Lisiec beds (Czêstochowa region), or the Kamień Beds (Pomerania region).

== Sedimentological evolution ==
On the Częstochowa region the sequences IX and X are developed mostly as alluvial, meandering river deposits with subordinate lacustrine lithofacies. The Deltaic deposits are found on the Suliszowice 38 BN Borehole and the arki 89 borehole, and show how these delta deposits were preceded by a short-lived brackish-marine ingression associated with lagoonal mudstones and heteroliths. The mudstone layers show high boron, along with the presence of pyrite concretions and more abundant Fodinichnia. The local delta episode is reported from the depositional sequence IX, while the sequence X is developed as alluvial deposits (sandstones with trough cross bedding and rich plant fossils) with some intercalations of lacustrine deposits.

On the Pomerania region the formation starts with a depositional sequence IX that begins with a common erosional surface seen on the Mechowo IG 1 borehole exposed by medium-to-fine-grained sandstones with trough cross bedding and horizontal bedding, that come from a series of from alluvial channels to distributary channels on depositional subsystems. It is overlaid by sediments composed by mudstone and heterolithic lithofacies that point to a rise in the level of the local water, but unclear if derived from a sea ingression or from alluvial floodplain deposits, delta plain deposits or, delta-front deposits. There are present coarsening-upwards cycles as well as slightly elevated boron content, which point to the dominated deposition of a delta. The Depositional sequence X is composed mostly of a thin sedimentary package of coarse alluvial sediments resting on the erosional surface and topped with a thin mudstone bed with the Paxillitriletes phyllicus spore.

== Profile ==
The profiles recovered between Aleksandrów Kujawski and Rogoźno on the Kuyavian-Pomeranian Voivodeship the Borucice Formation is known as the top of the sandstone series. There level is composed mostly by an admixture of coarse grain sandstone, which mark the beginning of a new sedimentary cycle. It has inserts of clayey Clay loupes present as a subordinate role. Is disposed along the Krogniewice series, composed of sandstones, in its main mass probably containing only thin and rarely broken clay inserts, while in the uppermost part there is abundant inserts. This part of the highest level is the equivalent of multiple phases of levels VI A and VI B in the vicinity of Kiodawa. Apparently, there is a lack of VI C level flashers in Krogniewice, which are eroded before the Aalenian level. Locally, the border section Middle/Lower Jurassic wasn't worked and the location of it wasn't completely solved. The Borucice Formation has a thickness here of 100–150 m. Overlaying the formation, is covered with transgression Aalenian sea sediments, where the transition, if exists, is gradual and small.

Stratigraphy of the Borucice Formation at the Gorzów Wielkopolski IG 1 Borehole
Unit	Lithology	Thickness (metres)	Palynology	Fossil Fauna
Youngest	0.3 m of fine-grained gray sandstone, poorly preserved core, illegible layering; 0.7 m of medium-grained, gray sandstone, poorly preserved core, illegible layering	753.9–760.7 m; thickness 7 m	Non Reported	Non Reported
N1	0.5 m - fine-grained, gray sandstone, poorly preserved core, illegible layering; 0.3 m of gray mudstone, horizontal lamination; 2.4 m of core with medium-grained gray sandstone, silt clusters in the upper and lower part, in the bottom large diameter (a few centimeters), made of green clay and siderite pebbles ilaste (erosion of underlying tracks). A clear erosive surface at a depth of 767.4 m is sequence limit	760.7–767.4 3.2 m of core	Paxillitrileites phyllicus	Non Reported

Stratigraphy at the Studzianna Borehole
Unit	Lithology	Thickness (metres)	Fossil Palynology/Flora	Fossil Fauna
Upper complex	Light gray sandstones, fine and medium-grained, infused with silt and light gray and gray yellows; in the lower part more numerous medium-grain inserts; numerous remains of flora, muscovite, pyrite concentrations.	40–55 m	Rhizoids	Planolites sp.; Unidentified Fodinichnia; Unidentified Repichnia
Medium complex	Fine-grained sandstones with numerous overflows of clayey and rhizoids, of dark gray and gray mudstones, prelate avenues; flora, mica.	40–45 m	Rhizoids	Planolites sp.; Unidentified Fodinichnia; Unidentified Repichnia
Lower complex	Fine-grained sandstones with overgrowth of loam and gray mudstones, numerous in the upper part; Shoals of translators; pyrite, fine mica, flora.	45 m	Rhizoids	Planolites sp.; Unidentified Fodinichnia; Unidentified Repichnia

== Dinosauria ==
Genus	Species	Location	Material	Notes	Images
Anchisauripus	A. isp.	Dąbie Tracksite	Footprints	Theropod tracks, type member of the ichnofamily Anchisauripodidae, incertae sedis inside Neotheropoda. Assigned to Coelophysidae-alike dinosaurs. Small to medium slender primitive predatory dinosaurs, related with genera such as Liliensternus, Tachiraptor, Zupaysaurus, Procompsognathus or contemporaneous taxa such as the North American Segisaurus.	Anchisauripus footprints belong to a genus similar to Procompsognathus
Grallator	G. isp.; Cf.G. isp.	Dąbie Tracksite; Idzikowice Tracksite	Footprints	Theropod tracks, member of the ichnofamily Eubrontidae, incertae sedis inside Neotheropoda. The footprints from Smilow are small-sized, tridactyl and relatively narrow. forms Assigned to Coelophysidae-alike dinosaurs.	Grallator footprints belong to a genus similar to Camposaurus
Therangospodus	T. isp.; Cf.T. isp.	Dąbie Tracksite; Idzikowice Tracksite	Footprints	Theropod tracks, member of the ichnofamily Eubrontidae, incertae sedis inside Theropoda. They have resemblance with the non-Tetanureae Sinosaurus, but match with Late Jurassic Orionides trackmakers. The distinct phalangeal pads make unsure to distinguish Therangospodus from Megalosauripus.	Therangospodus footprints can belong to relative of Magnosaurus
Trisauropodiscus	T. isp.	Dąbie Tracksite	Footprints	Ornithischian tracks, member of the ichnofamily Anomoepodidae, incertae sedis inside Ornithischia. This tracks resemble Middle Jurassic Ichnotaxa	Trisauropodiscus footprints can belong to relative of Hexinlusaurus

== Flora ==
The Polish Toarcian Palynology is assigned to the Paxillitriletes phyllicus (Ph) level (Isoetales), due to the abundance of this genus. The lower part of the Toarcian level is even marked by the numerous occurrences of this species, sometimes also slightly precede the appearance of the genera Erlansonisporites sparassis (Selaginella-like) and Minerisporites volucris (Isoetaceae), as shown on the Gorzów Wlkp. IG 1 Borehole. While the uppermost part is marked by a notorious decrease on the genus. The most common species found in Poland in this interval include: Erlansonisporites sparassis, E. excavatus, Minerisporites volucris and Biharisporites scaber (Lycopodiopsida), with Aneuletes potera (Selaginellaceae) and Trileites murrayi (Selaginellaceae) on the upper levels. The Toarcian disturbance of the carbon cycle, recorded on the Ciechocinek formation, coincides roughly with the appearance of Paxillitriletes phyllicus, that comes also with a clear change on the type of dominant palynomorphs recovered, changing from the predominance of pollen grains in the Upper Pliensbachian to Megaespores, what indicates a rather significant climate change, from moderate and relatively dry in late Pliensbachian to warm and humid in the early Toarcian. This shift on the local climate does correlate temporarily with a global maritime transgression, which allows the exact stratigraphic-sequential correlation of this event, where the initial volcanism in the volcanic province Karoo-Ferrar rise the global temperature and generating rapid abnormalities in the carbon cycle, manifested in the form of the super-greenhouse effect in the atmospheric system. Moreover, the mass occurrence of megaspore Paxillitriletes phyllicus correlate with the mentioned pulses and thus with extremely repetitive episodes hot and humid (greenhouse) climate, as the flora appears to be dominated by the family Isoetaceae, extremely hydrophilic, needing standing water to reproduction.

The Borucice Formation is where Paxillitriletes phyllicus drops significantly, which indicates a return to a more moderate climate during sedimentation, corresponding to the post-variabilis age, and related with drier conditions of the Middle Toarcian, as recovered in places such as the Raasay Ironstone Formation of the Inner Hebrides. It is measured also on the Lusitanian Basin or on Yorkshire. The Changes on the flora are also correlated with the more fluvial sedimentation of the Formation.

Genus	Species	Stratigraphic position	Material	Notes	Images
Bilsdalea	B. dura	Cianowice 2 borehole	Four pieces of cuticles	Incertae sedis affinities inside Pinales.	
Brachyphyllum	B. stemonium	Cianowice 2 borehole	Terminal leafy shoot fragments	Affinities with the Cheirolepidiaceae or Araucariaceae inside Pinales. This species is only known from the Middle Jurassic of Wildtshire.	
Cycadolepis	C. sp.	Cianowice 2 borehole	Bennettitalean cone scales	Affinities with the Cycadeoidaceae inside Bennettitales.	
Ctenis	C. sp.	Cianowice 2 borehole	Bennettitalean cone scales	Affinities with Cycadales inside Cycadopsida.	Ctenis specimen
Mirovia	M. szaferi	Cianowice 2 borehole	Three leaf fragments with apex, one fragment of cuticle, found on separate rock	Affinities with the Miroviaceae inside Pinales.	
Otozamites	O. falsus	Wyszmontów Borehole	Pinnae	Affinities with the Bennettitales inside Bennettitopsida.	
Pachypteris	P. lanceolata; P. rhomboidalis	Cianowice 2 borehole	Pinnae	Affinities with the Peltaspermales inside Pteridospermatophyta.	
Phlebopteris	P. muensteri	Ciechocinek IG 1 borehole	One Incomplete Pinna	Affinities with Matoniaceae inside Gleicheniales. Leaves of medium-sized ferns, related to modern Matonia.	Fossil Phlebopteris
Pterophyllum	P. thomasii; P. aequale	Cianowice 2 borehole	Pinnae	Affinities with the Williamsoniaceae inside Bennettitopsida.	

== Economical resources ==
Different options of hydrogen reservoirs underground storage were studied at the Łeba Elevation, Fore-Sudetic Monocline, Carpathian Foredeep, and salt stocks in the Polish Lowlands. The Borucice Formation covered in turn by Middle Jurassic fine-grained clastics especially of Aalenian and Bajocian age. The open porosity commonly ranges from 15% to 20% and pore water salinity reaches 200 g/L.

CO_{2} storage of this formation has been view on several locations, such as the Kamionki Anticline. The measured best conditions for geologic CO_{2} storage are displayed on the Borucice Beds and Lower Aalenian sandstones (Upper Sławęcin Beds) occurring below the Upper Aalenian clay-mud cap. On the Zaosie Anticline various aquifers for CO_{2} storage were reviewed, including two Lower Jurassic ones: Borucice Formation and the Pliensbachian Komorowo Formation The Borucice storage was tested in the boreholes of Zaosie 1 (at 500.0–665.0 m), Zaosie 2 (at 518.0–686.0 m), Zaosie 3 (at 537.0–680.0 m) and Budziszewice IG-1 (at 649.0–850.0 m), showing good reservoir properties (in terms of geological structure, thickness, lithology and physico-chemical characteristics) and is probably infiltrated by surface waters. The volumetric CO_{2} storage capacity was calculated on approximately 222 million tons. But due to the small depth of the aquifer, the Borucice Formation did not meet the requirements for a major CO_{2} storage.

Gostynin region has shown favourable geothermal conditions Lower-Middle Jurassic formations, with the Gostynin IG-1/1a Borehole (at 2290–2245 m depth) used for preliminary evaluation of balneological properties and thermodynamical status of these waters. The Borucice Formation (at 2702.6 – 2661.8 m; 2615–2605; 2310 – 2096.4 m), the occurrence of brines with Total Dissolved Solids from 99.4 to 110.0 g/dm3 was confirmed, characterized by low alteration of its chemical composition.

== See also ==
- List of fossiliferous stratigraphic units in Poland
- Blue Lias, England
- Charmouth Mudstone Formation, England
- Jurensismergel Formation, Germany
- Posidonia Shale, Germany
- Sorthat Formation, Denmark
- Hasle Formation, Denmark
- Zagaje Formation, Poland
- Drzewica Formation, Poland
- Ciechocinek Formation, Poland
- Rotzo Formation, Italy
- Saltrio Formation, Italy
- Moltrasio Formation, Italy
- Marne di Monte Serrone, Italy
- Calcare di Sogno, Italy
- Podpeč Limestone, Slovenia
- Coimbra Formation, Portugal
- El Pedregal Formation, Spain
- Fernie Formation, Canada
- Whiteaves Formation, British Columbia
- Navajo Sandstone, Utah
- Ziliujing Formation, China
- Yanan Formation, China
- Aganane Formation, Morocco
- Tafraout Group, Morocco
- Azilal Formation, Morocco
- Budoš Limestone, Montenegro
- Kota Formation, India
- Cañadón Asfalto Formation, Argentina
- Los Molles Formation, Argentina
- Kandreho Formation, Madagascar
- Elliot Formation, South Africa
- Clarens Formation, South Africa
- Evergreen Formation, Australia
- Cattamarra Coal Measures, Australia
- Hanson Formation, Antarctica
- Mawson Formation, Antarctica
