= Posidonia Shale =

Early Jurassic geological formation of south-western Germany

Sachrang Formation
- Stratigraphic range: Early-Late Toarcian; ~184–178 Ma Possible Latest Pliensbachian records
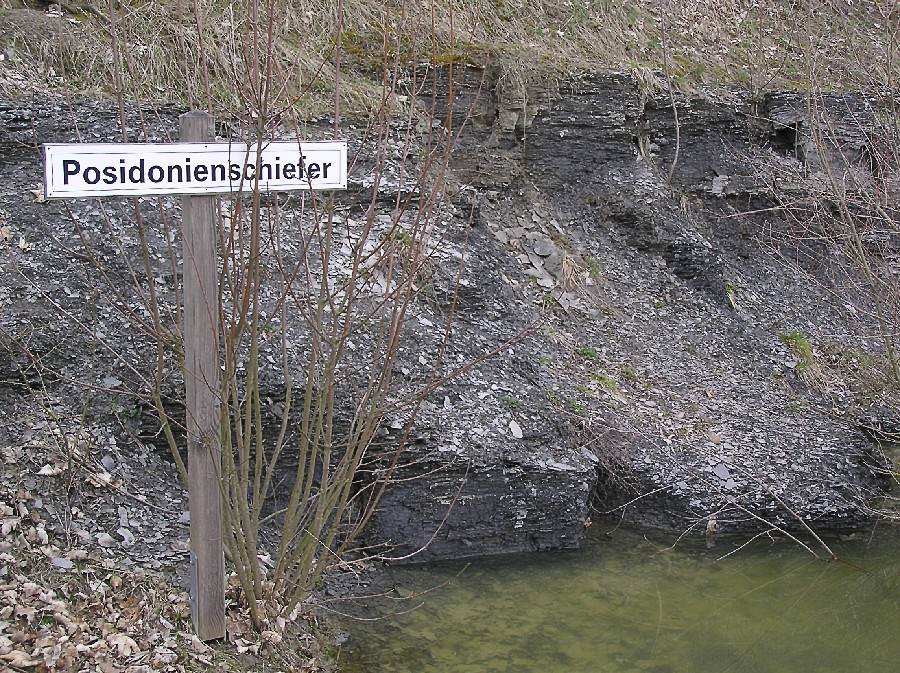
- Posidonia Shale (Posidonienschiefer) outcrop
- Type: Geological formation
- Unit of: Altena Group (Netherlands); Black Jurassic (Germany); Northern Calcareous Alps (Austria)
- Sub-units: Dactyliocerassandstein; Dörnten Member; Lehmhagen Member; Schistes bitumineux (Luxembourg); Informal "lower Mn-rich unit", "middle Mn-poor unit with black shales" and "upper organic-poor marls" (Austria)
- Underlies: Allgäu Formation (Austria); Jurensismergel Formation (Germany); Klaus Formation (Austria); Marnes à Bifrons Formation (Luxembourg); Glashütte Formation (Germany); Werkendam Formation (Netherlands)
- Overlies: Aalburg Formation (Netherlands); Amaltheenton Formation (Germany); Scheibelberg Formation (Austria); Wolgast Formation (Germany)

Lithology
- Primary: Black shale
- Other: Lime mudstone, nodular claystone

Location
- Region: Western & Central Europe
- Country: Germany, Netherlands, Austria, Switzerland, France, Luxembourg
- Extent: Northern Limestone Alps; North German basin; South German Scarplands

Type section
- Named for: The village of Sachrang, Bavaria
- Named by: Jacobshagen
- Location: Border with Tyrol above Sachrang
- Year defined: 1965
- Coordinates: 47.69°N 12.24°E
- Posidonia Shale (Germany) Holzmaden, location of the main outcrop of Posidonia Shale

The Posidonia Shale (German: Posidonienschiefer, also called Schistes Bitumineux in Luxembourg), is an Early Jurassic (Toarcian) geological formation in Germany, northern Switzerland, northwestern Austria, southern Luxembourg and the Netherlands.

Posidonia Shale got its name from the fossils of the oyster-related bivalve "Posidonia bronni" that are commonly found throughout the formation. However, this name is technically incorrect, as Posidonia is an invalid genus. The name Posidonia Shale has been used for more than a century, until two independent revisions of the Early Jurassic lithostratigraphy in Germany and Switzerland proposed a name change. The Posidonia Shale is currently known as the Sachrang Formation in Germany and as the Rietheim Member of the Staffelegg Formation in Switzerland. The Posidonia Shales is still considered a valid common name for the lower Toarcian Black Shales in this region.

Posidonia Shale, which was deposited under strongly reducing conditions during the Toarcian oceanic anoxic event, trapped and exceptionally preserved complete fossils of marine fish and reptiles.

The formation consists of oil shales formed of fine-grained sediments and bituminous limestones in fine, alternating layers. It crops out in several locations in southwestern Germany, although most remains are near the village of Holzmaden and Dotternhausen. The European oil shales deposited on a sea floor during the Early Toarcian in the ancient Tethys Ocean are described as being deposited in an anoxic deep water environment, although the details of the depositional environment are the subject of debate by researchers.

== Geology ==
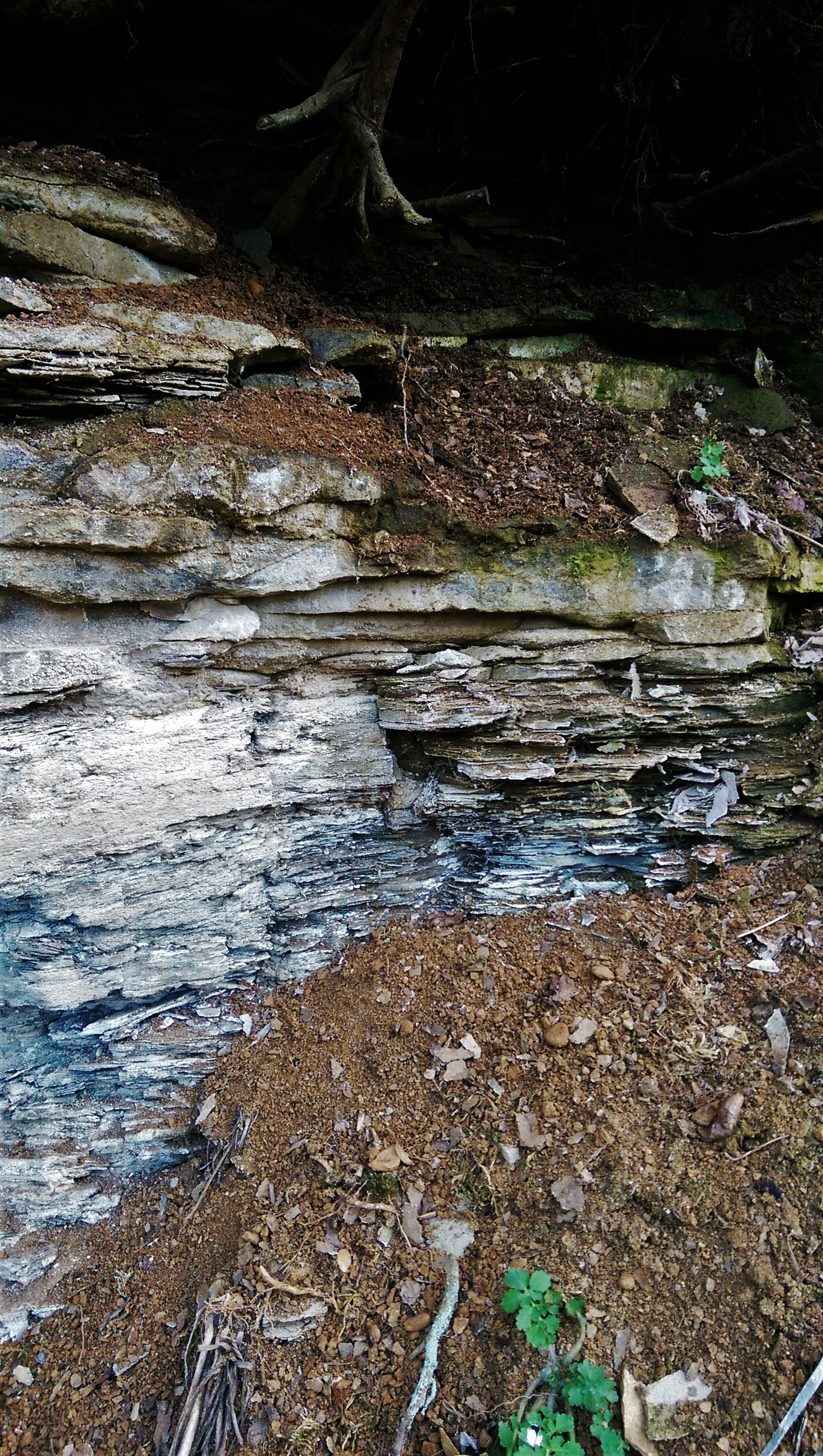
Posidonia shale – outcrop of the Black Jura near Hetzles

The Posidonia Shale was originally referred to as the Black Jurassic. It was first covered by the Franconian Jura, which borders the northeast on the Obermainisches Hügelland and the Oberpfälzisch-Obermainisches Hügelland, and is tectonically part of the Faulkschollenland. The cover of Franconian Jura rocks lies west of the Saxothuringian basement and borders the Franconian Line. Throughout Germany, it is covered by the early Toarcian Central European Epicontinental Basin (CEB) that gradually evolved from a low topography tidal flat, to floodplains, to a shallow shelf sea. The sea intermittently connected with the Viking Corridor and the Proto-Atlantic Ocean in the north, and with the Tethys Ocean towards the south. This filled the area between the Netherlands and Tyrol with seawater and subdivided it into several sub-basins with differing conditions and biotas. The CEB also established a relatively shallow transcontinental seaway between the Tethyan and the Boreal Arctic Sea biota, thus mixing cold and hot waters. The Mesozoic was marked by the breakup of Pangaea during the Late Triassic, which led to the early Atlantic Ocean connecting with the Boreal waters of the Panthalassa Ocean, and several local marine and continental sub-basins. The CEB was part of the Laurasian continental-marine shelf that rested over the Keuper and slowly opened towards the southeast into the deeper Tethys Ocean. This Early Jurassic marine flooding lead to the development of paleocurrents.

Towards the west is the north–south Kilberg Fault of the Keilberg Rift, the main fault in the Regensburg Basin. Developed by the sinking of the southern German Jura Plateau during the Miocene, it separates the higher, older crystalline Moldanubian Basement from the Lower Jurassic chalk complex of the eastern Franconian Jura. During the late Pliensbachian, the zone became a relatively narrow, flat deposit area that flooded during the early Toarcian. It reemerged during the Bifrons substage with a changing coastline, thanks to rhythmic uplifts and subsidences of older Paleozoic and Triassic siliciclastic deposits from the east. The granites and gneisses produced by the slow magma crystallization were eroded from the Paleozoic exposures on the east, and the resulting siliciclastic sediments were deposited on the Jurassic prograded alluvial nearshore sandstone that evolved gradually into the Bajocian layers. The slopes of the area are partially covered by till, soliflucted rubble and loess from the Würm glaciation.

== Stratigraphy ==
Lithostratigraphy of the Posidonia Shale in Germany

The German and Swiss stratigraphy systems were developed independently, which explains the different names used for the Posidonia Shale in these two countries: Sachrang Formation in Germany and the Rietheim Member of the Staffelegg Formation in Switzerland.

=== Sachrang Formation in Austria ===
The Sachrang Shales alocated in the Moosberggraben ravine were originally cited in the revision of the study on the Alpine Upper Black Slate, which is composed of dark grey, somewhat sandy, disintegrating marl that forms large, thin plates and overlies Pliensbachian breccia. The definition of the Sachrang Shales has been convoluted throughout the history of studies at the location, with works on the North Alpine Mesozoic preferring to call these deposits the Sachranger Shale to provide a brief, distinct diagnosis. It has been divided on 3 informal members, the "lower Mn-rich unit", the "middle Mn-poor unit with black shales" and the "upper organic-poor marls", all deposited on basins and sills surrounded by shallower swells. On the Unken syncline near Lofen, basin deposits with abundant aragonite and calcite help determine the major Jurassic basin geometry, as the posterior Alpine deformation made dating complicated on some layers. Correlated Unken and Diessbach basins developed mostly during the Toarcian, with deposits of abundant material from the near-emerged landmasses. On the Unken syncline, the breccias associated with the normal faults were deposited until the Oxfordian age.

=== Rietheim Member of the Staffelegg Formation in Switzerland ===
In Switzerland, after a revision of the Early Jurassic lithostratigraphy, many reference names have changed. The Rietheim Member of the Staffelegg Formation is now considered the lateral equivalent of the German Posidonia Shale in Switzerland. Therefore, the name Rietheim Member of the Staffelegg Formation replaces the former name Posidonienschiefer in Switzerland, while the German classification system remains unchanged. The German and the Swiss lithostratification classification systems are developed in an independent way and should not be mixed. In the German system, the former Posidonia Shales are at the formation level (Sachrang Formation), while in the Swiss classification, they are at the member level (Rietheim Member).

=== Detailed description of the stratigraphy in Germany ===
The bituminous facies overlie the Pliensbachian and consist mostly of clay marl and marl shales with a total organic carbon content of over 2% by weight. Some levels are referred to as "bitumen-free" or "bitumen-poor". The lowest sequence of layers is buried. It is made of seagrass shale (Seegrasschiefer), approximately 15–20 cm thick, with clay marl stone appearing in darker browns and greys. These first layers have abundant foraminifera and ostracods in a medium to light grey color. The next layer above features blue-grey marls of the uppermost Pliensbachian spinatum zone, being medium grey, pyrite-rich clay marl stones. They are also a part of the Amaltheenton Formation, which gradually wedge out to the east in the area of Aalen-Wasseralfingen. The middle includes thin, disturbed bituminous layers found throughout southwest Germany. Gradually, the bioturbation of the seagrass shale merges into the subsequent ash-grey marls without a sharp facies boundary. The ash-grey marl marks the start of the Posidonia Shale, made by dark grey marl, abundant in pyrite with bituminous marl shale intrusions. This layer marks a sea transgression, as it extends from Asselfingen/Wutach to Aalen-Reichenbach and then wedges out to the east from Aalen-Wasseralfingen. This initial sequence is overlaid by extremely thin (2–5 cm), unnamed bituminous, seagrass shale clay marl, followed by darker layers with the same lithology. The next are the "Koblenzer-Hainzen" clay successions of the upper semicelatum subzone, initially poorly layered and bituminous with abundance of Steirmannia radiata and Dactylioceras semieelatum. This section is well-layered and black-brown in color. It is marked by pyritized lagerstätten fossils, which are limited to Dotternhausen and Holzmaden. The Unteren Schiefern layers (Exaratum) appear next, marked by the highest bitumen content and characterized by very fine light/dark stratification, abundance of pyrite, fine-grained weathering, and the largely absent bioturbation derived from anoxic conditions, while the accumulation of exceptionally preserved fossils indicates very weak water movement. The next, Untere Stein, is the most important level of the formation, especially in southwest Germany, southern France, and Alsace-Lorraine. It appears across the area either as a concretionary "laibstein" horizon in the Aalen region, or as a uniformly layered limestone bank in the Wutach area. Leptolepis coryphaenoides is the characteristic fossil of this limestone bank.

The Mittleren Schiefer/Schieferklotz (upper exaratum to lower elegans subzones) becomes increasingly poorly layered until it becomes a small brittle limestone bank, the "Stinkkalkbank" (Dotternhausen to Gomaringen and Nürtingen) with Coelodiscus shells, low on bitumen and with biota that marks better oxygenated conditions, such as foraminifera and occasional ostracods. The Obere and Wilder Stein (upper elegans) medium to brown-grey always remain formed as a regular limestone bank of approximately uniform thickness, rarely laminated (Dotternhausen) and often shows traces of minor bioturbation (Dotternhausen, Mössingen, Gomaringen; Aalen-Wasseralfingen), becoming calcified towards the upper limit between Nürtingen and Holzmaden, marked with increased presence of Cucullaea muensteri as well foraminifera and ostracods, as well scoria horizons with fish, cephalopod and larger vertebrate remains, as well as belemnite rostrums. The last level of the formation is the Wilden Schiefer (probably reaching Bifrons zone) with the presence of "Monotis bank", from Altdorf to Dotternhausen and Göppingen area, with slates getting poorer in bitumen and less layered. The top section is known as "bollensis camp", marked by the mass deposition of Bositra buchi, closed at the top by a new seagrass slate. The limit with the Jurensismergel Formation is mostly eroded in profiles, evolving into marlstones. Several outcrops, mostly in the north-west (ex. Harz hills), show that relict levels of the Posidonia Shale lasted until the Upper Toarcian, contemporary with the Jurensismergel Fm., known as "Dörntener Schiefer".

== Lithology ==
The black shales are the main component of the strata, with a major bacterial component. The shale is represented by blackish-grey to dark brown bituminous, fine-leaved, somewhat sandy marl slate, that lies on the profile of the strata, alternating with storage light brown (max. 4 mm) and darker layers (rarely over 2 mm). The lighter layers get darker while keeping their fine-plate character. The shale has a dark-grey to brownish tone, alternating more rarely with light grey shades. Blue fittings are relatively common, as are wood and fish remains (bones and scales). The younger strata with the fresh outcrops develop on a series of several meters thick wall, that splits into fine paper slates when weathered. The shale is the most abundant rock fraction in these strata, while their carbonate content ranges from 26%-58%, averaging 40.2%. Bituminous claystones with green clay march engagements are present in the edge facies of the Sachrang shale, called the Unken shale. There is no clear separation between "manganese shale" and "bituminous shale" in the main localities of the formation, because the bituminous content fluctuates with the high manganese content. The Unken shales on the Bächental locality is layered on a major 60% silicate component with a pronounced dominance of illite, along with a significant amount of montmorillonite. The presence of quartz and calcite is similar to other locations of the same region within the time period, with pyrite content being consistently high. The Unken shales samples also show minor levels of dolomite and feldspar. There is a great abundance of foraminiferans and coccoliths. Dinoflagellates are the major organic component and are the most abundant microfossils. Manganese is present, particularly in the Toarcian deposits of Hungary. Those are completed by marl levels composed of lithoclasts. Quartz and smectite are the main minerals, along with illite, chlorite, and plagioclase in minor amounts. Bächental bituminous marls consist mainly of quartz and carbonate minerals. Isorenieratene derivatives are highly abundant on this level and are related to several processes such as sedimentary iron, influenced by anoxic conditions. Rhodochrosite and manganese-rich calcite are present in the manganese levels, while the black shale levels are rich in pyrite. The lower matrix is composed of clay and carbonate minerals, such as muscovite and feldspar. The presence of altered celadonite suggest volcanic origins as the most probable source, where the high amounts of dissolved manganese of continental origin was translated to the epicontinental margins of the Tethys. On the Bächental bituminous marls, calcite is the most abundant mineral (49%), followed by phyllosilicates (35%), quartz (11%) and pyrite (5%). The clay mineral distribution includes a large amount of illite (51%), montmorillonite (40%) and kaolinite (9%).

== Dating ==
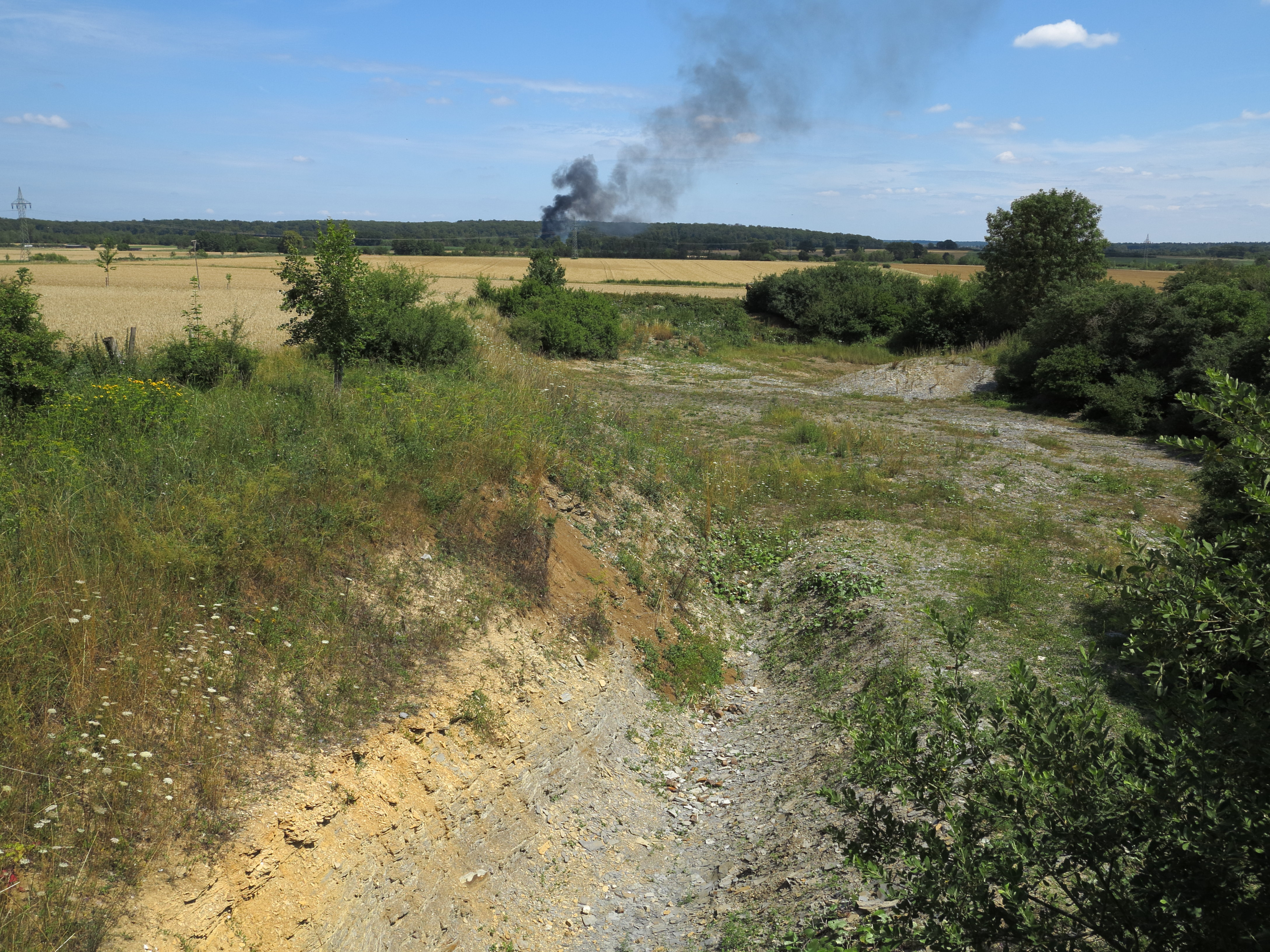
The former marl pit of Hondelage, NW Germany. At the bottom of the image there is an 8 m-long (26 ft) stretch of Posidonia Shale exposed.

Based on sediment and palynological features, a tidally influenced transgressive development within the Lower Toarcian is inferred, with increased transport of continental material into marine areas, leading to anoxic conditions. The Posidonia Shale is the reference formation for this interval. The Posidonia Shale of Dotternhausen and Schesslitz is well dated on the basis of ammonite and microfossil biostratigraphy. The Lower Toarcian sections are subdivided into three ammonite biozones (Dactylioceras tenuicostatum, Harpoceras falciferum, and Hildoceras bifrons) and several subzones. On the other hand, Black shale formation in the Toarcian of north-west Germany is associated with a major turnover in phytoplankton assemblages interpreted as the response to lowered salinities in surface waters of the epicontinental sea. The presence of this turnover is essential for the dating and preservation of the fauna of the formation, with detailed index ammonites preserved. The study of the different layers and strata of the Posidonia Shale has given different data about the chronology of the formation. Dormettingen shales have been calculated biochronologically and with isochron data, giving an approximate age of 183-181 million years, being close to the Pliensbachian boundary based on the recent revisions of the Early Jurassic Subperiods. The Toarcian and the Pliensbachian are considered strongly constrained in terms of chronology, where the deposition has been estimated to have lasted 3.2 Myr in the South German Basin, with the uppermost sequences estimated to be Bifrons in age. The Posidonia Shale lasts until the Late Toarcian (Variabilis Biozone) in the north-west German Basin with the "Dörntener Schiefer", while it mostly disappears in the south-west, substituted by the Jurensismergel Fm., with few deposits where it lasts (Wutach area, Nürtingen).

== History ==
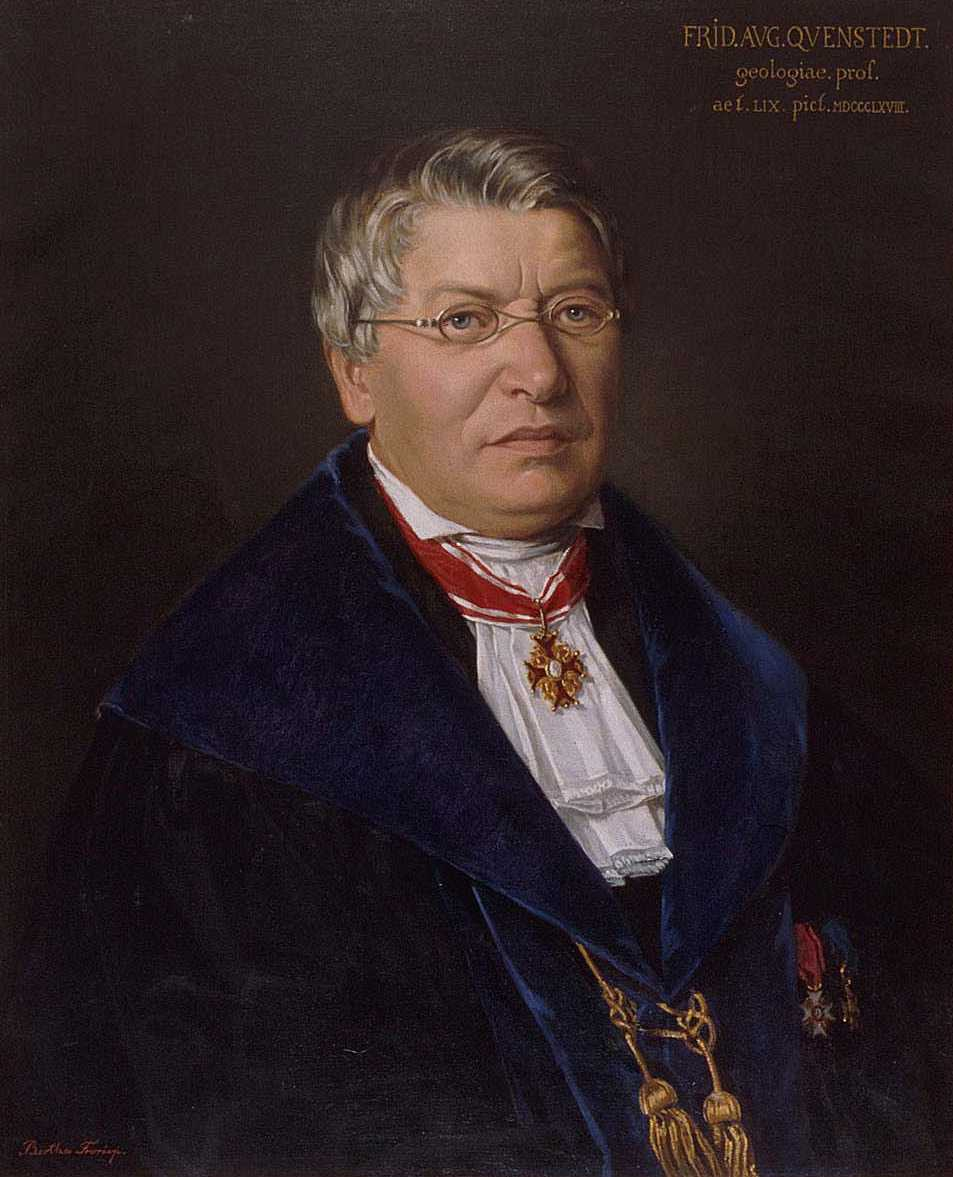
Friedrich August von Quenstedt, a German mineralogist who studied the Jurassic strata along Germany, including the Black Shales of the Posidonia Shale

The Posidonia Shale has been a focus of scientific interest since the 1800s. The first fossils were recorded in 1598 by the medical doctor Johannes Bauhin, who interpreted the local ammonites as "metallic things" in rocks and as "miraculous tricks" of nature, while the crinoids were interpreted as either huge flowers or heads of medusa, and evidence of the biblical flood. Notable researchers of the Swabian Posidonia Shale include Carl Hartwig von Zieten, Eberhard Fraas, Bernhard Hauff senior, and Adolf Seilacher.

The first geological studies were carried out in response to shale extraction at the southern quarries. Several fossils were reported, studied, and named at the time from locations such as Banz Abbey, Ohmden, Holzmaden, and Dotternhausen. These include Macrospondylus in 1824 (As Steneosaurus, being originally identified as a Gharial), the pterosaur Dorygnathus in 1830, the fish Lepidotes, the shark Hybodus, and the crinoid Pentacrinites. The first flora was discovered in 1845, with partial leaf fragments. In 1829, Ami Boué studied the geology of the Jurassic within Germany, recovering limestone and shale facies. Boué assigned superficial names to what he considered the main Jurassic strata without classifying the layers into subperiods. Further geological work recovered examples of facies of various marine biomes, all associated with black shale deposits towards the north-west and Regensburg. The facies were formally described by Quenstedt in 1843, classifying the layers based on the amount of bitumen. This provided a preliminary basis for stratigraphy and lithology and would serve as the basis for most subsequent work.

In the 1900s, major paleontological addons included the description of Stenopterygius in 1904 (as Ichthyosaurus). In 1921, Hauff conducted the first major fossil inventory. This included well-preserved specimens, most of them from Holzmaden, including ammonites, fish, and marine reptiles such as plesiosaurs and ichthyosaurs. In 1938, Hauff described "Acidorhynchus" (Saurorhynchus), the latest surviving of the Saurichthyiformes. In 1953, a well-preserved insect was recovered in the northern outcrops. In 1978, Rupert Wild described the first and only known dinosaur fossil from the formation, a small-sized sauropod which he named Ohmdenosaurus. Latter works revisited the exceptional preservation of the biota, especially the presence of soft parts. The lithology and sedimentology of the formation were revisited, with several suggestions such as stagnant basin models and restricted open marine ones, all suggested to be deposited on a shallow epicontinental sea. The abundance of organic matter and the composition of the shales, chemically or lithologically, underwent diverse reviews. With the addition of multiple new references, the expansion of information thanks to the revision of profiles, boreholes and other outcrops, new works on the characteristics of the deposition, the type of environment and the conditions that led to the exquisite preservation were produced, where paleocurrents where found to be influenced from the north and the south of the Central European Basin. The Black shale deposition was found to be related with changes in the oxygen levels. Thanks to the renewed information, a new cycle of publications reviewing the microfacies took place between 1980-1990. The most important works of the 20th century were done by Riegraf in 1985-1986. This was a complete review of all aspects of this formation, updating multiple points based on all the information compiled throughout the century: lithology, stratigraphy, biota list and ammonite biozonation, followed by a focused work on a complete mapping of the microfacies composition and extent of the shale deposits.

In the 2000s, the Posidonia Shale has seen a series of studies focused on enriching the information previously examined in depth and revising and updating the depositional models. Likewise, the biota has received multiple updates, with the reclassification of some taxa and the discovery of new ones, as well a revision of the biotic interactions.

== Paleogeography and paleoenvironment ==
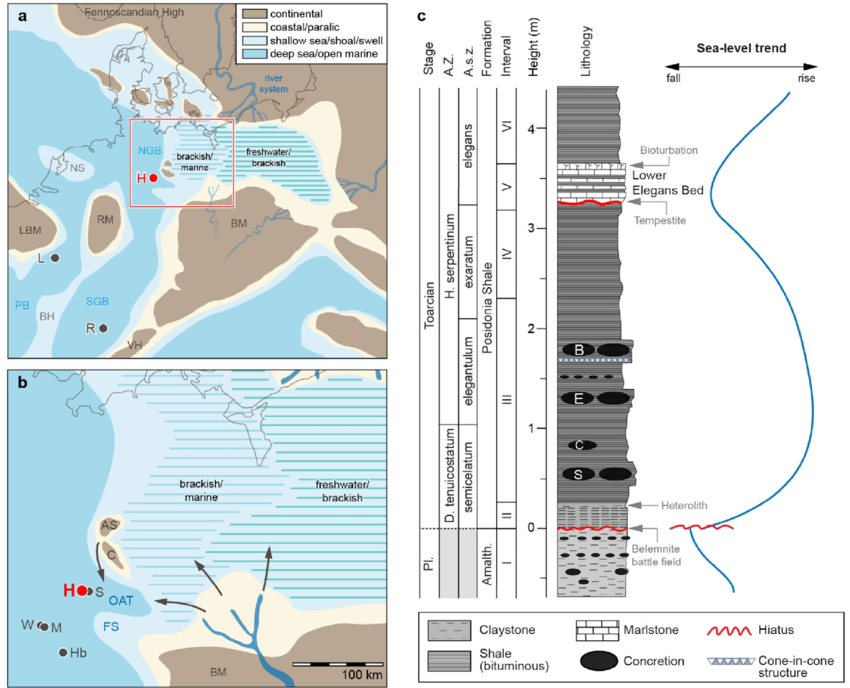
Paleogeography of the Early Toarcian Central European Area, with close panoramic of the Hondelange & Schandelah outcrops and adjacent emerged lands

The Posidonia Shale was located in the south-west and north-west Germanic basins, as part of a shallow epicontinental sea, and was surrounded and influenced by various highs and emerged lands that supplied most of the terrestrial material within the formation. The main outcrops of the formation are distributed along modern southern Germany, covering the locations of Holzmaden, Ohmden, as well as Niedersachsen, and others appearing along the east, such as the strata related to the Banz Abbey strata or Regensburg. The deposition of the shales were limited to several minibasins, including the Southwest German Basin, a hemipelagic deposit, with the influence of open sea currents from the north and the south, with an estimated water depth of 2–100 m, with few deeper shelf environments. Connected to the south-west German basin was the Paris Basin, that recovered central France, with correlated sedimentation to the shale deposition on Germany, also sharing an epicontinental sea, bordered by carbonate facies, specially towards the south. At the north, the Wenzen Well report little deeper basinal settings, heavily influenced by continental matter coming from the main continental land present near the formation, Fennoscandia. In this area, the main emerged units present was the Rhenish High at the west, being a small land of the size of Sicily, and on the east, the north Bohemian Massif. The Bohemian massif with the southern Vindelician High represent the major emerged units present on the Central European Basin (CEB) on the Toarcian. The Vindelician Land/High has been represented as a peninsula to the Bohemian Massif, or an isolated landmass, that is due to its connections that had not been recovered in depth, being considered a mostly plain emerged sedimentary structure. Finally, the southernmost part of the formation, the SWGB was separated from the Tethys Ocean by a series of islands related with the Bern High (Allemanic Swell), forming the continuation of the Vindelician High being a small terrestrial setting with similar size to modern Sardinia, with nearby sections like the Salem paleo-swell.

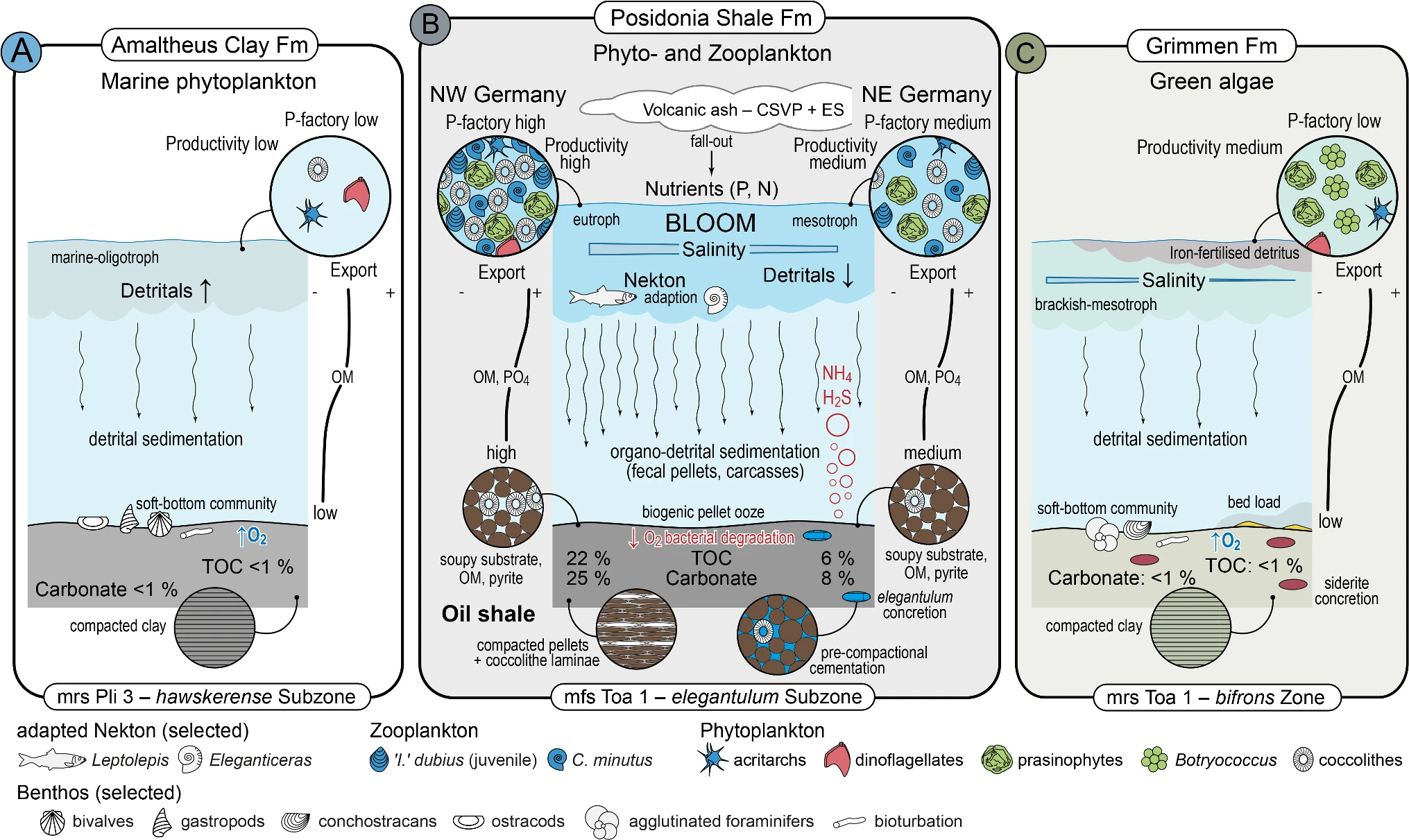
Pliensbachian–Toarcian plankton communities in the NGB

The Germanic epicontinental sea is considered to be an analogue, as it compares well to the sedimentation rate in deep-water settings, of the Black Sea. Most of the outcrops (Holzmaden, Dotternhausen, Ohmden, or Dormettingen) represent low-energy depositional environments, far from delta sediment sources. The Toarcian epicontinental seas of Europe were driven by several global events and changes present on the surface, like the coeval Karoo-Ferrar eruptions in the Southern Hemisphere, which created an enhanced hydrological cycle and an oxygen depletion, allowing exceptional preservation. This stage was marked with the presence of a general deposition of shale mudrock along with strong variations on the associated organic matter, related to extinctions such as the Toarcian Oceanic Anoxic Event. The black shales characteristic of this unit reveal a shallow marine environment, influenced by arctic and Tethyan waters, with marked episodes of disappearance of benthic biota. Also, they measure a change in carbon-isotope excursion in marine and terrestrial life, and it was probably a perturbator of the carbon cycle. Global seawater has been proved to be approximately, for the interval of the negative carbon-isotope excursion, close to 1.45‰, less than modern values, with estimated 2.34‰. Water interchange was one of the major effects on the palatine de-oxygenation observed in most Lower Toarcian layers worldwide, with the connection to the Viking Corridor as a key factor, due to fresh Arctic waters disrupting oceanic circulation. The effect was consequently negative on the German realm, where the environments expose a tropical fluctuation, with conditions similar to the modern Caribbean Sea, which hosted a high variety of sea fauna, except on the bottom layers, where only a few genera were able to survive until oxygen conditions improved. The changes on the benthic oxygen were common, with most of the animals dying without being scavenged by bottom-dweller organisms, and sessile life, with this biota limited to "benthic islands" associated with ammonite shells or vertebrate carcasses (except some Polychaetans on higher oxygen conditions). Towards the middle Toarcian, changes on the environment reflect more oxygenated waters and different depositional settings with the presence of trace fossils such as Chondrites and Phymatoderma granulata, surfacing deposit-feeding animals, becoming more common on the uppermost layers, yet in some areas, the shale remained until the Late Toarcian. Regressive sea levels mark the uppermost layers, as is shown on layers across Bavaria where major events set the fate of the nearshore environments. One example is the case of the Monotis–Dactylioceras beds, which had an extent of +500 km, that has been linked with a possible tsunami. There is no major indication of synsedimentary faulting in South Germany, but it is present on the western Tethyan Shelf, where earthquake-generated breccias occur in Toarcian levels of the Austrian Adnet Formation. It would start as an initial wave propagation affecting the Altdorf High, aiming for the south, where it would have hit the shoreline of the Bohemian Island.

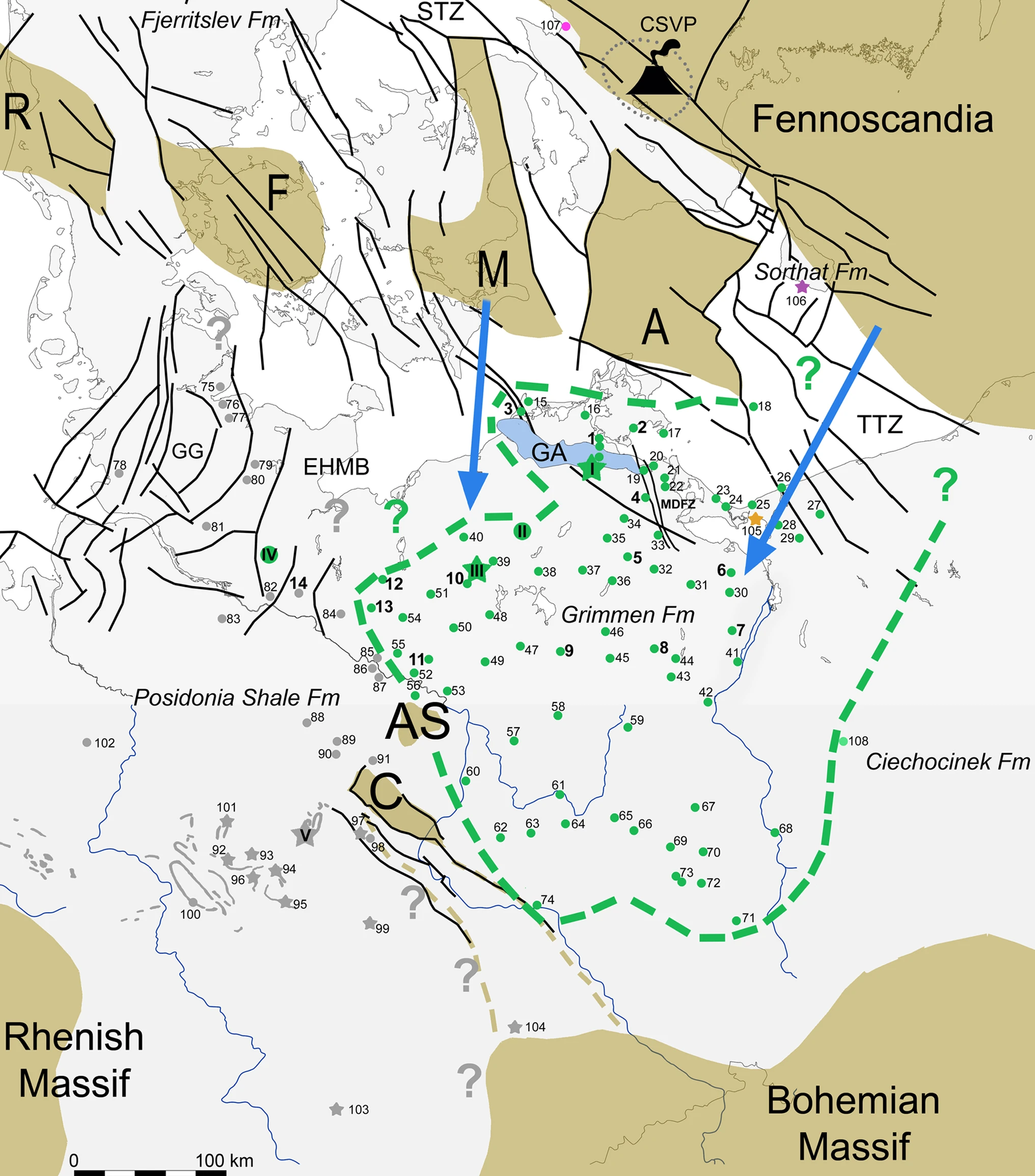
Simplified paleogeography of the NGB in the Toarcian, with the extent of the Grimmen Formation and adjacent units

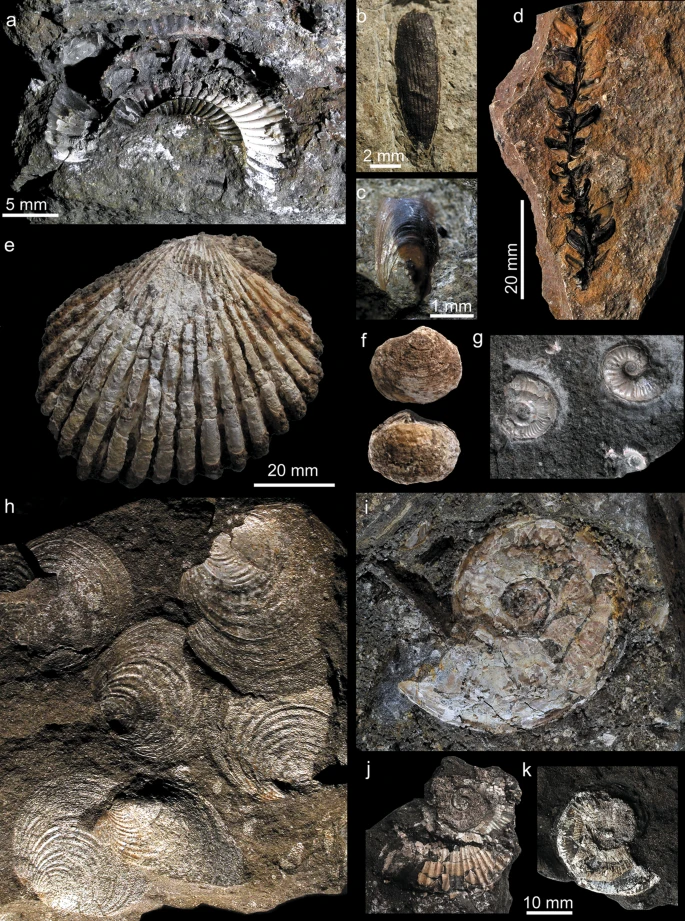
Lehmhagen Member biota

The main terrestrial environments of the Posidonia Shale are the near emerged lands where the Black Forest High/Swell (known thanks to strata containing fine sand in the tenuicostatum Zone, 'Glaukonit und viel Feinsand', at Obereggenen im Breisgau), located at 70 km at the west and the Ries Swell, west of Regensburg, then far towards the west, the Vosges Massif is also suggested to be present (known by the abundant detrital quartz from the EST433 borehole located near Bure, Meuse). The Environments of these highs are assumed to have been through phases of aridity and humidity marked by the Toarcian Oceanic Anoxic Event based on palynology. In the east, the SW German sub-basin was bounded by the Bohemian-Hercynian landmass (modern Bohemian Massif), with the Vindelician peninsula at the S-SW, reaching the west area of Augsburg. Between the Hettangian-Toarcian, this threshold was perhaps temporarily connected via a land bridge with an island in the area of the Aarmassif. The Bohemian Massif was located in a relatively warm, precipitation-rich climate with Bavarian shallow areas receiving freshwater inflows from the east. This temporarily lowered the salinity of the seawater in the basin. The margins of the SWGB, as well as the hinterland relief, had very gentle topography, and therefore fine-grained siliciclastic sediments were easily transported and deposited in the nearshore area of the basin, as well as long transported driftwood, and the lack of insects or terrestrial vertebrates. In the south-eastern North-German Basin at Hondelange and Schandelah, the Posidonienschiefer was deposited in the "Oberaller Through", a local depression bordered by the emerged "Calvörde Island" and the submerged Altmark Swell to the north, while the shallow submerged Fallstein Swell closed it at the south, and more towards the east, the Bohemian Massif hosted a large delta that discharged towards Oberaller.

In microfacies, after the Pliensbachian-Toarcian, a significant decrease in the crinoid skeleton elements, also that of the Ophiurida; the echinoids take their place, where they really blossomed at that time, while Pedicellaria are observed very often. On the bituminous marls, there is a great abundance of saturated hydrocarbons in the hexane-soluble fraction, methyl and methylene, where found along long-chain paraffinic molecules (n-alkanes). Benzene-methanol resins are especially strong for the benzene-methanol fraction. The main maceral found is lamalginite, which may derive from thin-walled planktonic and benthic organisms, including green algae, cyanobacteria, and bacterial mats. There is a clear low frequency of vitrinite and inertinite, which suggests that terrestrial inputs of organic matter (OM) are of less importance. The main part of OM contained in the basal mudstone was derived from terrestrial sources. This mudstone contains charred organic material, typically connected to wildfires, along with large amounts of expandable smectite, possibly derived from alteration of volcanic ash, indicating a contribution of volcanic debris during deposition. In the Austrian area, the volcanic materials were likely sourced by the rift history of the Valais, Briançonnais and Piemonte-Liguria domains (Sinemurian-Callovian), and the Toarcian break-up of the Ligurian-Penninic oceanic realm. There are measurements of the reduction of the local salinity in the water where elevated inputs of freshwater due to an accelerated hydrological cycle resulted in a surface-water layer.

=== Dactyliocerassandstein ===
Occurs only in the south-east of the northern Bavarian Jura region, as appears on places like Bruck in der Oberpfalz, the north-east of the Banz Abbey, Wittelshofen, Regensburg and Bodenwöhr, composed mostly by coarse grained sediments, clusters of clay sandstone and sand-limestone facies (shale, slightly bituminous in layers, and sandstone, older Lias sand, sand marl, marl, oolithic limestone and sand-lime banks). This series is coeval with the Posidonienschiefer, marked with more thin outcrops such as the "crassumbank" (Coeloceras cf. crassum, latter found to be C. raquinianum, thus Variabilis in age) at Bodenwöhr, or the Dactylioceras sandstones at Irlbach (north-east Regensburg). These levels lack bituminous facies or are interspersed with them in profiles as one moves westward, indicating that they probably belonged to more coastal sectors with better oxygenated waters, with the full transition from shale to sandstone in Regensburg, Bruck and Naab areas considered as caused by a major regression of the sea level, marked at Irlbach by white-yellow levels indicating karst funnels or cenote-like deposition.

=== Lehmhagen Member ===
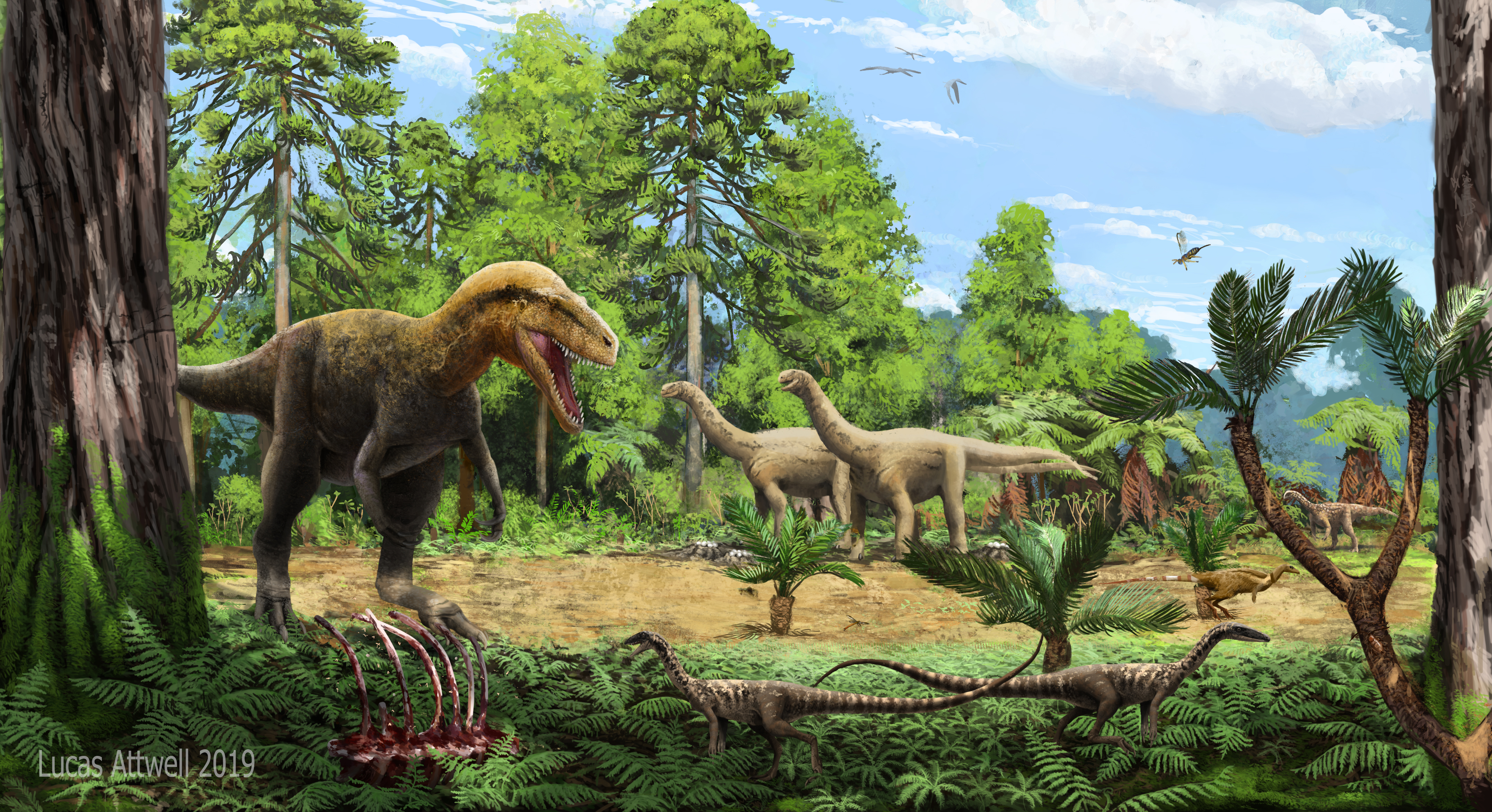
Terrestrial environment of the Toarcian Fennoscandinavia, with flora based on the Sorthat Formation. Animals are based on material found on the Lehmhagen Member, the Grimmen Formation, and tracks of the older Drzewica Formation.

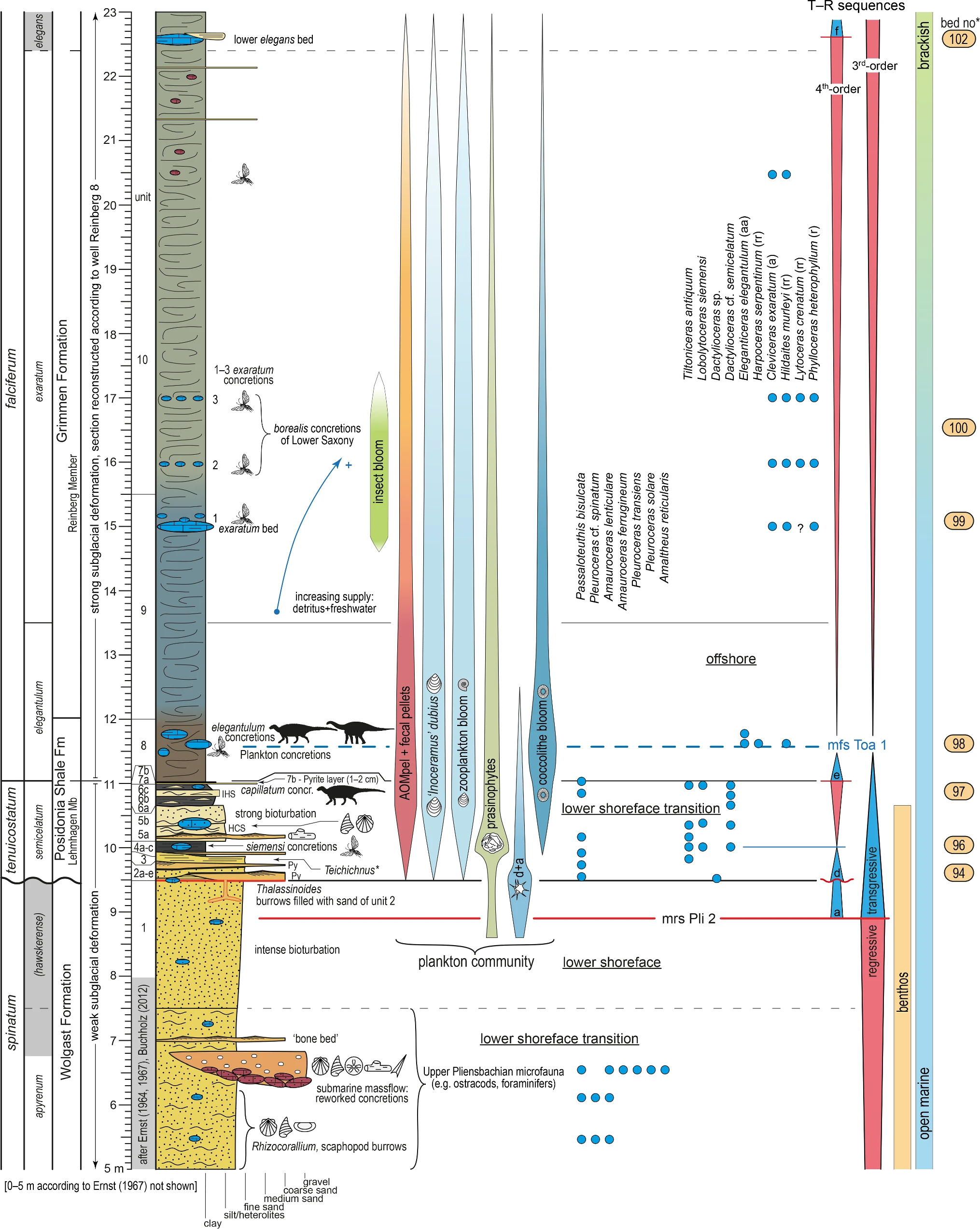
Profile at Grimmen

The Lehmhagen Member, named after the village of Klein Lehmhagen, was previously referred to as the Ciechocinek Formation and later as the Grimmen Formation. In 2025, it was identified as a new subunit within the Posidonia Shale, notably the one with dinosaur remains and continental biota, otherwise mostly unknown from the formation. It comprises organo-detrital shales interspersed with coastal heteroliths and fine to coarse-grained sandstones. The type section is situated in the northern Grimmen clay pit. This sequence overlies an erosive boundary with upper Pliensbachian shoreface sands, transitioning upward from coarse coastal sands to finer organo-detrital clays and heterolithes, culminating with a sharp contact to the organic-rich clay. In the North German basin axis, the member thins to a few decimeters, as observed in the Grambow 5 well. Organic-rich clays and heteroliths with concretions are also noted in Dobbertin. Biostratigraphically significant concretions, named for their index ammonites, mark this member.

=== Dörnten Member ===
The Dörnten Member was named in 2025, despite being known before, and reflects a transgressive phase of the upper Posidonia Shale. It overlays the greenish clays of the Grimmen Formation and the river delta sandstones of the Glashütte Formation. Similar to the 'Dörntener Schichten' in the Salzgitter and north-west Germany regions, it is characterized by fossiliferous, organic-rich strata. The reference section is in the Grambow 5 well, a 16m thick sequence of dark grey laminated claystone. Ammonite records indicate a range from the upper bifrons to the upper Thouarsense zone. It thins eastward in the Reinberg 1E well and transitions upward into marine claystones of the Opalinuston Formation or river delta sandstones of the lower Glashütte Formation.

== Economical value ==
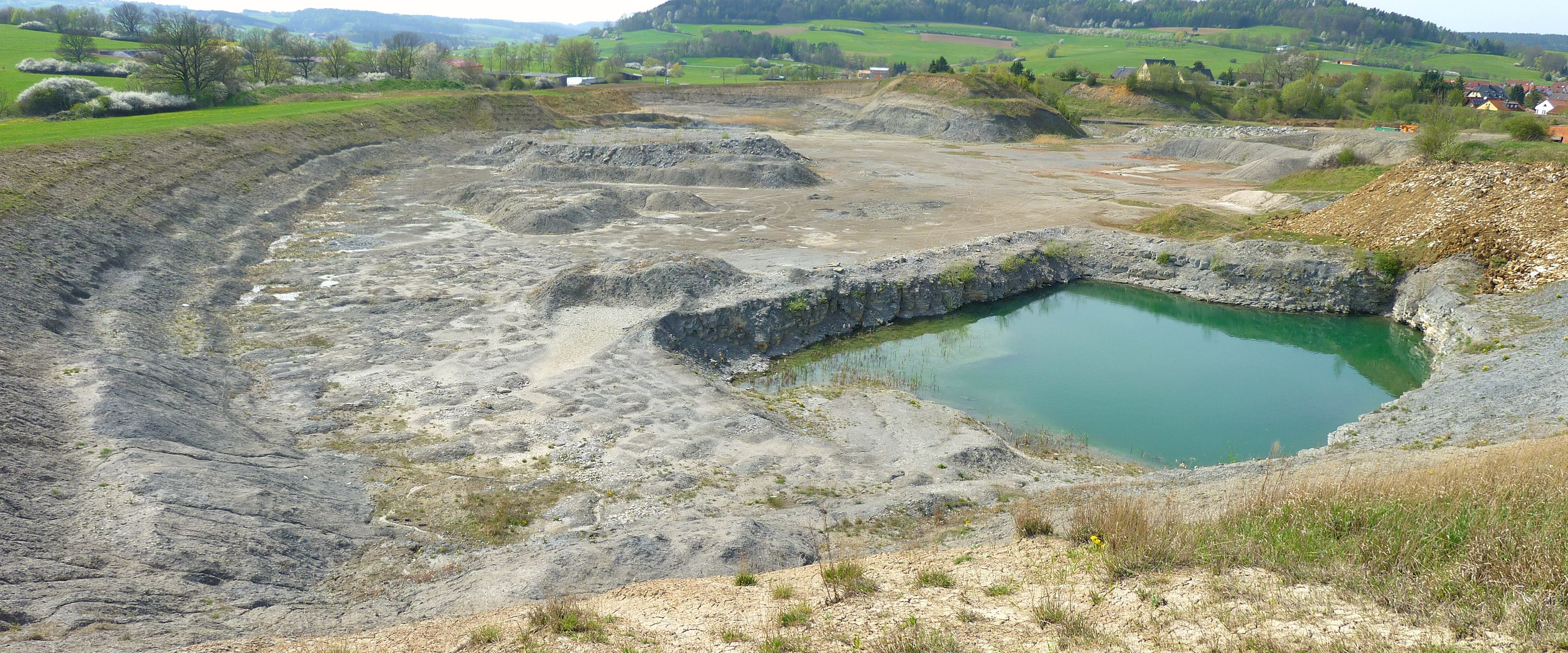
Former clay pit in Mistelgau

The Posidonia shale has been mined in the Holzmaden area for centuries to make wall, table, and window panels. Other uses of the shale included making fireplace stones in Gomaringen-Mössingen, which were later replaced by Eifel pumice stone. At Dotternhausen, the Rohrbach Zement company used oil shale to produce binders, mining up to 1,600 t in the 1980's. Shale oil, especially after World War II, was temporarily obtained from the bituminous shale through smoldering and distillation by oil works near Reutlingen; Frommem or Holzheim near Göppingen. Due to low profitability and the fact that they produced a lot of slag and sulfur-containing exhaust gases, production didn't last long.

Recent studies have shown that the petroleum generation potential of the Posidonia Shale is high across all studied regions due to high total organic carbon (TOC) and hydrogen index (HI) values. However, differences exist that can be expressed by SPI values. The latter are highest for northern Germany, where the Posidonia Shale is richest in organic carbon and has the highest HI values combined with a thickness of 30 to 40 m at most places. Since the first serious evaluations in the 2000s, different organic samples were extracted to revise the changes and potential presence of the shale oil on the main quarries of the southern realm. Based on several core samples with abundant organic material (dinoflagellate cysts and other microorganism fragments, such as microscopic algae), varying thermal maturity has been observed, especially in samples from the Hils Syncline strata. The maturation of this strata has implied a loss of organic carbon and a decrease in hydrogen index values. The status of the samples has been stable for at least 40 measured years.

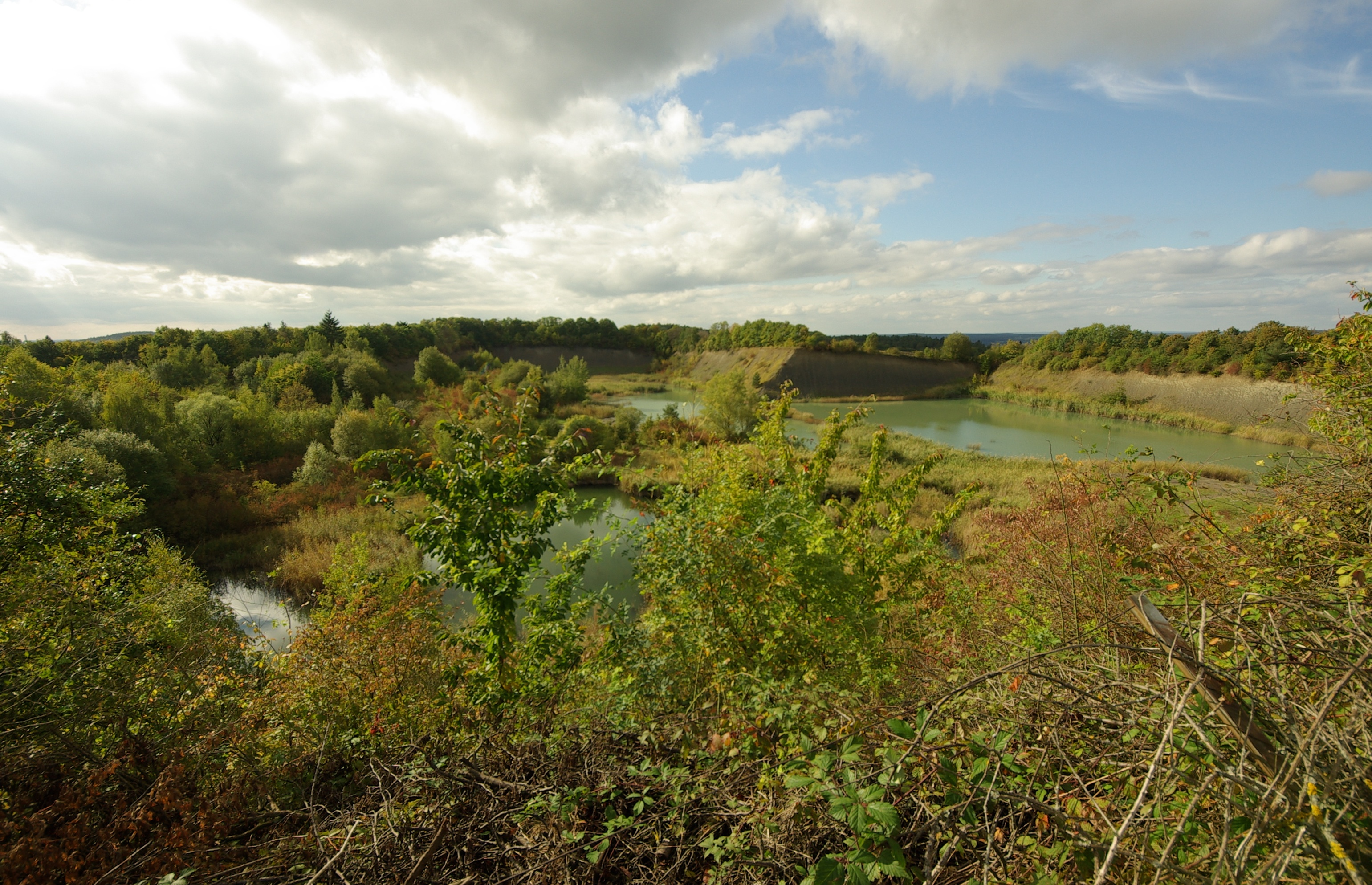
Former clay pit in Marloffstein

== Paleontological significance ==
In addition to their Posidonia bronni, the shales contain well-preserved fossils of other Jurassic sea creatures, such as ichthyosaurs and plesiosaurs, spiral-shelled ammonites and crinoids. Some of the best-preserved fossils found from the Early Jurassic are from the Posidonia Shale. There are also abundant fish fossils (including genera such as Pachycormus, Ohmdenia, Strongylosteus, and chondrichthyes like Hybodus or Palaeospinax). Most of the fauna is marine, with several terrestrial specimens, including semiaquatic forms such as the sphenodont Palaeopleurosaurus and fully terrestrial ones like the dinosaur Ohmdenosaurus and several insects.

Flora has been found, especially the genus Xenoxylon. There are also macrofloral remains of Otozamites, Equisetites and Pagiophyllum and palynomorphs, dominated by Classopollis.

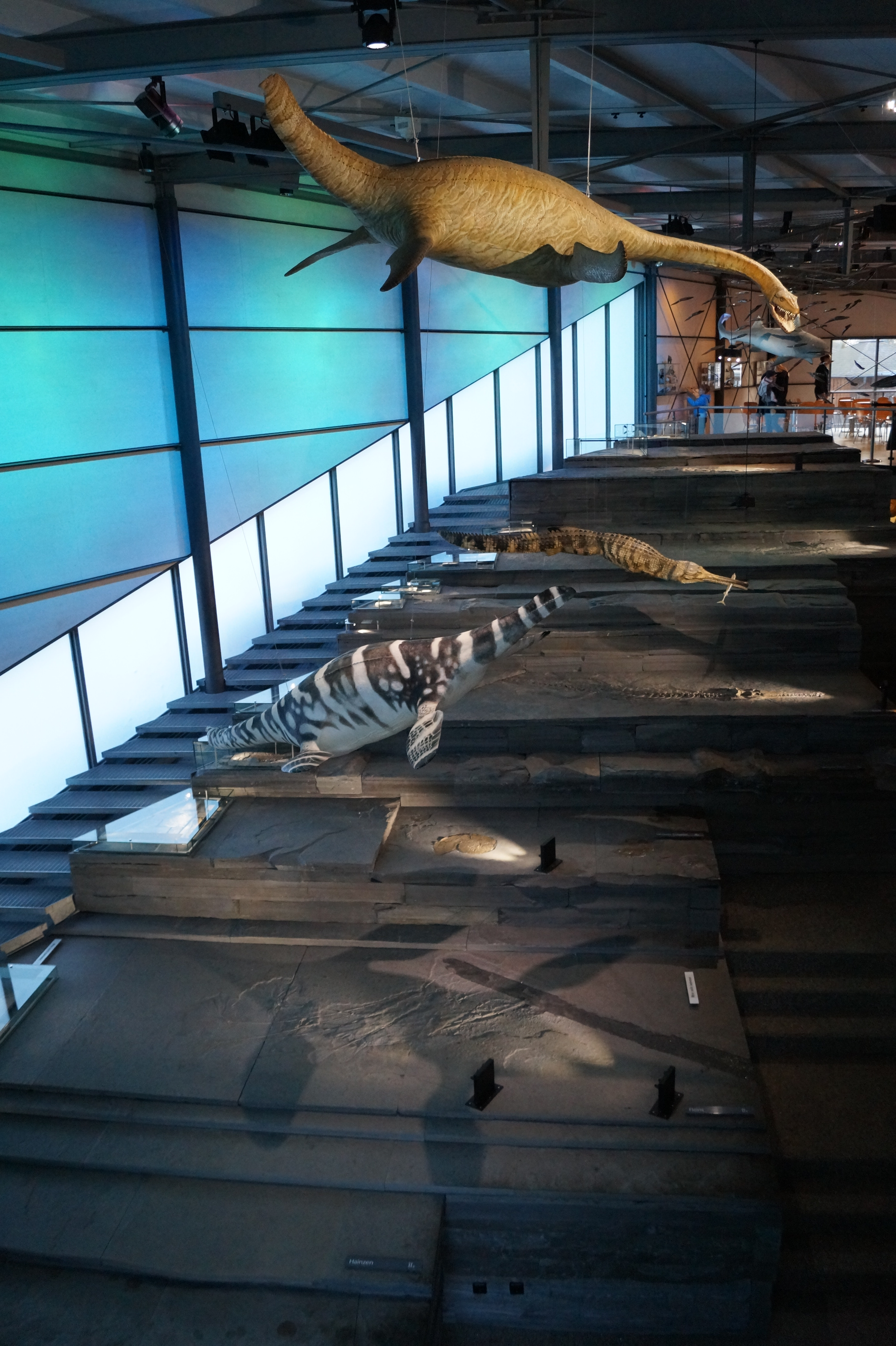
Interior of the Urweltmuseum Hauff

=== Urweltmuseum Hauff ===
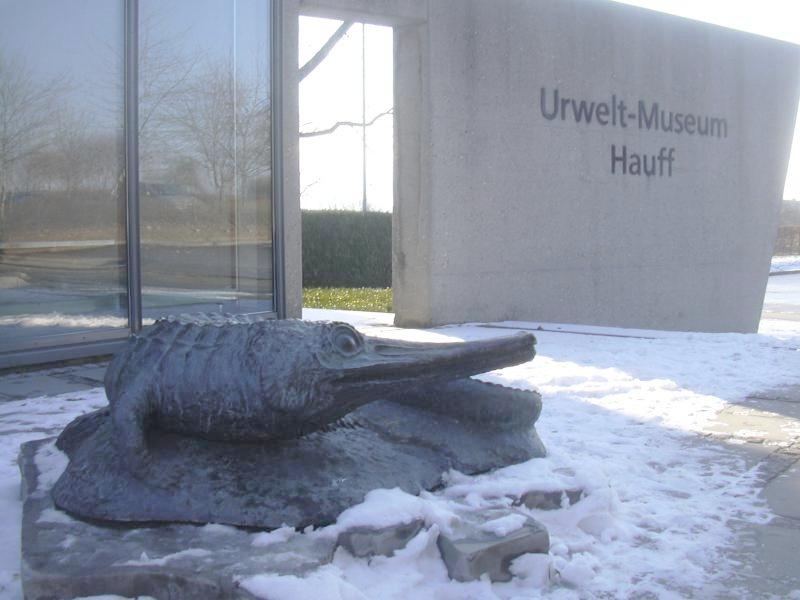
The exterior of the Urweltmuseum Hauff

The Hauff Museum in Ohmden houses some of the best specimens of the Posidonia Shale found in the last 150 years. The museum has several displays for the marine fauna, where it is exposed, including a disposed strata with the layer showing the provenance of every taxon and its fossil. The museum has been open since 1937-1938 and was founded by Bernhard Hauff, using his private collection of fossils as a basis, whereas Alwin Hauff wanted to use the layers for industrial production. The museum was remodeled between 1967 and 1971. In the year 2000, an external park with dinosaur models was added. The museum has several halls with different kinds of fauna found on the layers of the formation, where the vertebrate specimens are exposed on the main parts, including on those icthyosaur remains and several fishes. The museum has the world's largest colony of sea lilies, measuring approximately 100 square meters. Rolf Bernhard Hauff is the current director of the museum.

== See also ==
- Paleobiota of the Posidonia Shale
- Blue Lias, England
- Charmouth Mudstone Formation, England
- Jurensismergel Formation, Germany
- Sorthat Formation, Denmark
- Hasle Formation, Denmark
- Zagaje Formation, Poland
- Drzewica Formation, Poland
- Ciechocinek Formation, Poland
- Borucice Formation, Poland
- Rotzo Formation, Italy
- Saltrio Formation, Italy
- Moltrasio Formation, Italy
- Marne di Monte Serrone, Italy
- Calcare di Sogno, Italy
- Podpeč Limestone, Slovenia
- Coimbra Formation, Portugal
- El Pedregal Formation, Spain
- Fernie Formation, Canada
- Whiteaves Formation, British Columbia
- Navajo Sandstone, Utah
- Ziliujing Formation, China
- Yanan Formation, China
- Aganane Formation, Morocco
- Tafraout Group, Morocco
- Azilal Formation, Morocco
- Budoš Limestone, Montenegro
- Kota Formation, India
- Cañadón Asfalto Formation, Argentina
- Los Molles Formation, Argentina
- Kandreho Formation, Madagascar
- Elliot Formation, South Africa
- Clarens Formation, South Africa
- Evergreen Formation, Australia
- Cattamarra Coal Measures, Australia
- Hanson Formation, Antarctica
- Mawson Formation, Antarctica
