= Lava Formation =

- Stratigraphic range: Lower Toarcian 183–179 Ma
- Type: Geological formation
- Unit of: Jotvingiai Group
- Underlies: Skalviai Group
- Overlies: Neringa Formation
- Thickness: 45 m

Lithology
- Primary: Sandstone and clay with a coaly admixture and the inclusion of wood remains.
- Other: Shallow, continental basins with sandy-clayey sediments deposited with traces of breaks and weathering. Upper part is dominated by argillaceous sediments. Cemented sandstones with interlayers of kaolinite-hydromica clays.

Location
- Country: Lithuania, Kaliningrad Oblast

Type section
- Named for: Lava River

The Lava Formation is a Mesozoic geologic formation in Lithuania and Kaliningrad, being either the sister or the same unit as the Ciechocinek Formation. It represents the outcrop of Lower Toarcian layers in the Baltic Syncline and in the Lithuanian-Polish Syneclise (C8-borehole in Gdańsk Bay). It is known by the presence of Miospores and Pollen, as well Plant remains. The formation contains grey, greenish, and dark grey silt and clay with interealatians and lenses of fine-grained sand, pyritic concretions and plant remains (carbonised wood fragments). The Jotvingiai Group Toarcian deposits represent deposits laid down in fresh water and brackish basins, possibly lagoons or coastal plain lakes. The Bartoszyce IG 1 of the Ciechocinek Formation shows how at the initial phase of the Toarcian there was a regional transgression in the Baltic Syncline, indicated by greenish-grey mudstones, heteroliths and fine-grained sandstones with abundant plant fossils and plant roots, what indicates a local delta progradation between the Lava and Ciechocinek Fms. Then a great accumulation of miospores (+2500 specimens) indicates a local concentration, likely due to a rapidly decelerating fluvial flow in a delta-fringing lagoon forming a “hydrodynamic trap”, with the wave and currents stopping the miospores to spread to the basin. Latter a marsh system developed with numerous palaeosol levels, being overlaid by brackish-marine embayment deposits that return to lagoon-marsh facies with numerous plant roots (Radicites sp) and palaeosol levels in the uppermost section, ending the succession. Overall the facies show that the local Ciechocinek-Lava system was a sedimentary basin shallow and isolated, surrounded by a flat coastal/delta plain with marshes, delivering abundant spores and Phytoclasts, indicators of proximal landmasses with high availability of wood and other plant material. This climate at the time of deposition was strongly seasonal, probably with monsoonal periods. Due to the abundant presence of deltaic sediments on the upper part, it is considered to be related to the retry of the sea level. The Lava Formation was deposited on a mostly continental setting, with its upper part, dominated by argillaceous sediments, corresponding to the Ciechocinek Formation. There is a great amount of kaolinite content, being present laterally in the basin, decreasing and lifting space to increasing smectite to the south-west of the formation. On the other hand, there is a great amount of coarsest sediments, which consist mostly of sands.

== Palynology ==
Genus	Species	Stratigraphic position	Material	Notes	Images
Leiotriletes	Leiotriletes rotundiformis	Nida-44 Borehole; Belyj Jar-1 Borehole; Uljanovo-3 Borehole; Kybartai-29 Borehole	Miospores	Affinities with Botryopteridaceae, Cooksoniaceae, Schizaeaceae, Sermayaceae and Zosterophyllaceae. Likely reworked from Devonian-Permian layers	
Acanthotriletes	Acanthotriletes elatus	Nida-44 Borehole; Belyj Jar-1 Borehole; Uljanovo-3 Borehole; Kybartai-29 Borehole	Miospores	Affinities with the Botryopteridaceae and Selaginellaceae. Reworked from primitive ferns found in Devonian and Carboniferous rocks of Europe	
Staplinisporites	Staplinisporites caminus	Nida-44 Borehole; Belyj Jar-1 Borehole; Uljanovo-3 Borehole; Kybartai-29 Borehole	Miospores	Affinities with the family Encalyptaceae inside Bryopsida. Branching Moss Spores, related with high water-depleting environments	Example of extant Encalypta specimens, Staplinisporites come probably from similar genera
Lycopodiumsporites	Lycopodiumsporites semimuris	Nida-44 Borehole; Belyj Jar-1 Borehole; Uljanovo-3 Borehole; Kybartai-29 Borehole	Miospores	Affinities with the family Lycopodiaceae inside Lycopodiopsida.	
Foveosporites	Foveosporites microreticulatus	Nida-44 Borehole; Belyj Jar-1 Borehole; Uljanovo-3 Borehole; Kybartai-29 Borehole	Miospores	Affinities with the family Lycopodiaceae inside Lycopodiopsida. Lycopod spores, related with herbaceous to arbustive flora common on humid environments	Extant Lycopodium specimens. Genera like Foveosporites probably come from a similar plant
Uvaesporites	Uvaesporites argenteaeformis	Nida-44 Borehole; Belyj Jar-1 Borehole; Uljanovo-3 Borehole; Kybartai-29 Borehole	Miospores	Affinities with the Selaginellaceae inside Lycopsida.	
Densoisporites	Densoisporites crassus	Nida-44 Borehole; Belyj Jar-1 Borehole; Uljanovo-3 Borehole; Kybartai-29 Borehole	Miospores	Affinities with the Selaginellaceae inside Lycopsida. Relatively abundant	
Heliosporites	Heliosporites altmarkensis	Nida-44 Borehole; Belyj Jar-1 Borehole; Uljanovo-3 Borehole; Kybartai-29 Borehole	Miospores	Affinities with the Selaginellaceae inside Lycopsida. Herbaceous Lycophyte flora, similar to Ferns, related with Humid Settings. This Family of Spores are also the most diverse on the Formation.	Extant Selaginella, Heliosporites probably come from a similar or a related Plant
Leiozonotriletes	Leiozonotriletes sp sp. nov.	Nida-44 Borehole; Belyj Jar-1 Borehole; Uljanovo-3 Borehole; Kybartai-29 Borehole	Miospores	Uncertain Affinities with the Pteridopsida.	
Cingulatisporites	Cingulatisporites scabratus; Cingulatisporites sp sp. nov.	Nida-44 Borehole; Belyj Jar-1 Borehole; Uljanovo-3 Borehole; Kybartai-29 Borehole	Miospores	Affinities with Cibotiaceae and Selaginellaceae inside Pteridopsida. Relatively abundant	
Leptolepidites	Leptolepidites major; Leptolepidites sp sp. nov.	Nida-44 Borehole; Belyj Jar-1 Borehole; Uljanovo-3 Borehole; Kybartai-29 Borehole	Miospores	Affinities with the family Dennstaedtiaceae inside Polypodiales. Forest Fern Spores	Example of extant Dennstaedtia specimens, Leptolepidites come probably from similar genera
Pilosisporites	Pilosisporites brevipapillosus	Nida-44 Borehole; Belyj Jar-1 Borehole; Uljanovo-3 Borehole; Kybartai-29 Borehole	Miopores	Affinities with Schizaeaceae and Lygodiaceae inside Pteridophyta. Either from herbaceous or climbing ferns	
Klukisporites	Klukisporites sp sp. nov.	Nida-44 Borehole; Belyj Jar-1 Borehole; Uljanovo-3 Borehole; Kybartai-29 Borehole; C8-borehole	Miospores	Affinities with the family Lygodiaceae inside Polypodiopsida. Climbing fern spores	Example of extant Lygodium, Lygodioisporites come probably from similar genera or maybe a species from the genus
Clathropterisospora	Clathropterisospora obovata; Clathropterisospora "sp. 1"; Clathropterisospora "sp. 2"	Nida-44 Borehole; Kybartai-29 Borehole	Miospores	Affinities with Dipteridaceae inside Polypodiales.	
Dictyophyllidites	Dictyophyllidites sp sp. nov.	Uljanovo-3 Borehole; Kybartai-29 Borehole	Miospores	Affinities with Dipteridaceae inside Polypodiales. Dictyophyllum is a common Dipteridacean genus of the mid-Mesozoic	Dictyophyllum nilssonii specimen
Marattiopsis	Marattiopsis scabratus	Nida-44 Borehole; Belyj Jar-1 Borehole; Uljanovo-3 Borehole; Kybartai-29 Borehole	Miospores	Affinities with the Marattiaceae inside Polypodiopsida.	
Matonisporites	Matonisporites phlebopteroides	Nida-44 Borehole; Belyj Jar-1 Borehole; Uljanovo-3 Borehole; Kybartai-29 Borehole	Miopores	Affinities with the Matoniaceae inside Polypodiopsida. Fern spores from lower herbaceous flora	Example of extant Matonia specimens, Matonisporites come probably from similar genera
Cyathidites	Cyathidites minor	Nida-44 Borehole; Belyj Jar-1 Borehole; Uljanovo-3 Borehole; Kybartai-29 Borehole	Miospores	Affinities with the family Cyatheaceae inside Cyatheales. Arboreal Fern Spores	Example of extant Cyathea, Cyathidites come probably from similar genera
Tripartina	Tripartina variabilis; Tripartina sp sp. nov.	Nida-44 Borehole; C8-borehole	Miospores	Affinities with Dicksoniaceae inside Cyatheales. Common cosmopolitan Mesozoic Tree fern genus.	Coniopteris specimen
Camptotriletes	Camptotriletes anagrammensis; Camptotriletes cerebriformis; Camptotriletes triangularis	Nida-44 Borehole; Belyj Jar-1 Borehole; Uljanovo-3 Borehole; Kybartai-29 Borehole	Miospores	Affinities with the Lepidodendraceae and Botryopteridaceae. Reworked Carboniferous Palynomorphs	
Hymenozonotriletes	Hymenozonotriletes dalinkevidiusi; Hymenozonotriletes speciosus	Nida-44 Borehole; Belyj Jar-1 Borehole; Uljanovo-3 Borehole; Kybartai-29 Borehole	Miospores	Affinities with the Lepidodendraceae. Reworked	
Protopinus	Protopinus sp sp. nov.	Nida-44 Borehole; Belyj Jar-1 Borehole; Uljanovo-3 Borehole; Kybartai-29 Borehole	Pollen	Pollen from the Family Caytoniaceae inside Caytoniales. Caytoniaceae are a complex group of Mesozoic Fossil floras, that can be related to both Peltaspermales and Ginkgoaceae.	
Chasmatosporites	Chasmatosporites apertus; Chasmatosporites hians; Chasmatosporites sp.	Nida-44 Borehole; Belyj Jar-1 Borehole; Uljanovo-3 Borehole; Kybartai-29 Borehole; C8-borehole		Affinities with the family Cycadaceae inside Cycadales. Is among the most abundant flora recovered on the upper section of the coeval Rya Formation, and was found to be similar to the pollen of the extant Encephalartos laevifolius.	Extant Encephalartos laevifolius. Chasmatosporites maybe come from a related plant
Paleoconiferus	Paleoconiferus sp sp. nov.	Nida-44 Borehole; Belyj Jar-1 Borehole; Uljanovo-3 Borehole; Kybartai-29 Borehole	Pollen	Affinities with the Voltziaceae, Pinaceae, Cupressaceae and Araucariaceae inside Pinopsida.	
Pseudopinus	Pseudopinus oblatinoides	Nida-44 Borehole; Belyj Jar-1 Borehole; Uljanovo-3 Borehole; Kybartai-29 Borehole	Pollen	Affinities with the Voltziaceae inside Pinopsida.	
Protopodocarpus	Protopodocarpus sp sp. nov.	Nida-44 Borehole; Belyj Jar-1 Borehole; Uljanovo-3 Borehole; Kybartai-29 Borehole	Pollen	Affinities with the Voltziaceae inside Pinopsida.	
Paleopicea	Paleopicea sp sp. nov.	Nida-44 Borehole; Belyj Jar-1 Borehole; Uljanovo-3 Borehole; Kybartai-29 Borehole	Pollen	Affinities with the Pinaceae and Voltziaceae inside Pinopsida.	
Pseudopicea	Pseudopicea sp. sp. nov.	Nida-44 Borehole; Belyj Jar-1 Borehole; Uljanovo-3 Borehole; Kybartai-29 Borehole	Pollen	Affinities with the Pinaceae inside Pinopsida. Relatively abundant Pinaceae Pollen, appears specially on Kaolinite-abundant strata.	Extant Picea. Pseudopicea maybe come from a related plant
Cerebropollenites	Cerebropollenites dalinkeviciusi	Nida-44 Borehole; Belyj Jar-1 Borehole; Uljanovo-3 Borehole; Kybartai-29 Borehole; C8-borehole	Pollen	Affinities with the Sciadopityaceae or Miroviaceae inside Coniferales. This Pollen resemblance with extant Sciadopitys suggest that Miroviaceae can be an extinct lineage of sciadopityaceaous-like plants.	Extant Sciadopitys. Cerebropollenites likely come from a related plant
Perinopollenites	Perinopollenites sp sp. nov.	Nida-44 Borehole; Belyj Jar-1 Borehole; Uljanovo-3 Borehole; Kybartai-29 Borehole; C8-borehole	Pollen	Affinities with the family Cupressaceae inside Pinopsida. Pollen that resembles extant genera such as the Genus Actinostrobus and Austrocedrus, probably derived from Dry environments.	Extant Austrocedrus. Perinopollenites maybe come from a related plant
Cupressacites	Cupressacites coriaceus; Cupressacites subgranulatus	C8-borehole	Pollen	Affinities with the family Cupressaceae inside Pinopsida.	
Taxodiites	Taxodiites pallens	C8-borehole	Pollen	Affinities with the family Cupressaceae inside Pinopsida.	
Classopollis	Classopollis corniculatus; Classopollis sp.1 sp. nov.; Classopollis sp.2 sp. nov.; Classopollis sp.3 sp. nov.	Nida-44 Borehole; Belyj Jar-1 Borehole; Uljanovo-3 Borehole; Kybartai-29 Borehole; C8-borehole	Pollen	Affinities with the Cheirolepidiaceae inside Pinopsida. Indicator of Dry settings	

== Megaflora ==
Genus	Species	Stratigraphic position	Material	Notes	Images
Phlebopteris	Phlebopteris cf. smithii	Nida-44 Borehole	Isolated pinnae	Affinities with Matoniaceae inside Gleicheniales.	Example of Phlebopteris specimen
Ginkgoites	Ginkgoites acuta; Ginkgoites "sp. 1"	Nida-44 Borehole; Belyj Jar-1 Borehole	Leaves	Affinities with Ginkgoaceae inside Ginkgoales. Large to medium Arboreal trees, common on the Fennoscandinavian realm, but also on the Siberian strata	Ginkgoites specimen
Picea?	Picea? sp sp. nov.; Picea? sp.1 sp. nov.; Picea? sp.2 sp. nov.	Nida-44 Borehole; Uljanovo-3 Borehole	Cones	Affinities with the Piceoideae inside Coniferales.	Example of extant Picea cones
Pinus?	Pinus? sp sp. nov.	Nida-44 Borehole	Cones	Affinities with the Pinaceae inside Coniferales.	Example of extant Pinus cones
Podozamites	Podozamites sp sp. nov.	Nida-44 Borehole	Leaves	Affinities with Krassiloviaceae inside Voltziales. The local Podozamites show a rather great range of Growth, reflecting Tropical to subtropical conditions.	Podozamites reconstruction
Elatocladus	Elatocladus sp.	Nida-44 Borehole	Leaves	Affinities with the Cupressaceae inside Coniferales.	Elatocladus

== See also ==
- List of fossiliferous stratigraphic units in Lithuania
- Toarcian turnover
- Toarcian formations
  - Marne di Monte Serrone, Italy
  - Calcare di Sogno, Italy
  - Mizur Formation, North Caucasus
  - Djupadal Formation, Central Skane
  - Sachrang Formation, Austria
  - Saubach Formation, Austria
  - Posidonia Shale, Lagerstätte in Germany
  - Ciechocinek Formation, Germany and Poland
  - Krempachy Marl Formation, Poland and Slovakia
  - Azilal Group, North Africa
  - Whitby Mudstone, England
  - Fernie Formation, Alberta and British Columbia
    - Poker Chip Shale
  - Whiteaves Formation, British Columbia
  - Navajo Sandstone, Utah
  - Los Molles Formation, Argentina
  - Mawson Formation, Antarctica
  - Kandreho Formation, Madagascar
  - Kota Formation, India
  - Cattamarra Coal Measures, Australia
