= Ciechocinek Formation =

Jurassic geologic formation in Europe

- Stratigraphic range: Lower Toarcian; ~182–179 Ma Tenuicostatum-Bifrons
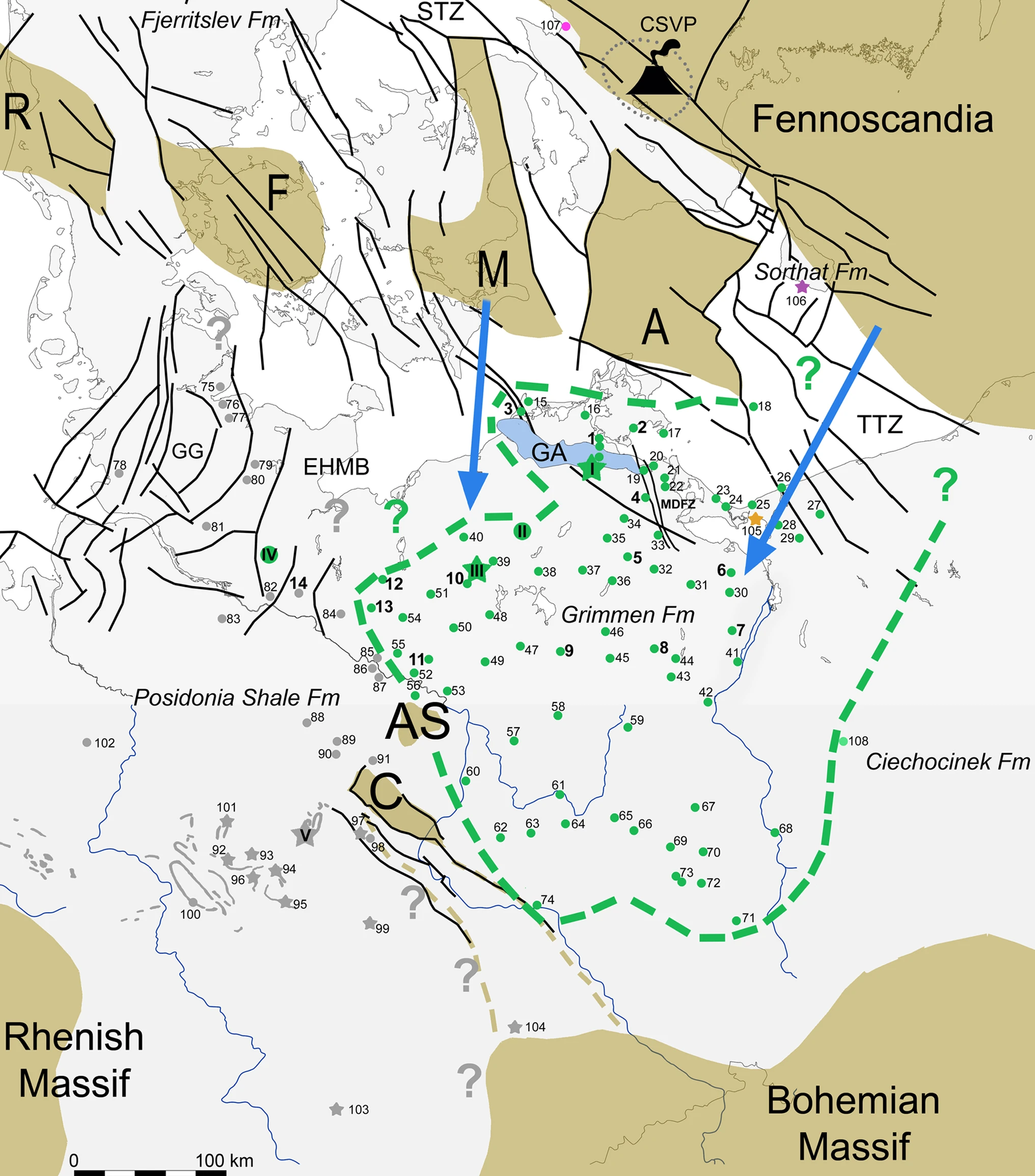
- Northern Germany units, including the Ciechocinek and its sister Grimmen Formation
- Type: Geological formation
- Unit of: Kamienna Group; Jotvingiai Group?
- Sub-units: Lava Formation?
- Underlies: Borucice Formation; Polomia Beds; Kościelisko beds
- Overlies: Olsztyn Formation; Neringa Formation; Blanowice Formation; Drzewica Formation
- Area: Polish Basin
- Thickness: 140 m (460 ft)

Lithology
- Primary: Claystone & abundant Clay Pits
- Other: Sandy-clayey sediments deposited with traces of breaks and weathering. Grey heteroliths, Mudstones, Claystones, Siltstones and fine-grained Sandstones

Location
- Country: Poland; Kaliningrad Oblast, Russia; Lithuania
- Extent: Approx. 205,000 km^{2} (79,000 sq mi)

Type section
- Named for: Ciechocinek, Poland
- Named by: Stefan Zbigniew Różycki (as an informal unit)
- Year defined: 1958
- Ciechocinek Formation (Poland)

The Ciechocinek Formation (also known as the Gryfice Formation at Suliszewo) is a Jurassic (lower Toarcian) geological formation extending across the Baltic coast, primarily in Poland, with minor occurrences in Lithuania and Kaliningrad. It represents one of the largest deltaic systems in the fossil record, covering approximately 7.1 × 100,000 km² in the Polish realm. Deposited in a brackish-marine embayment within the eastern arm of the Mid-European Toarcian Basin, it is a sister unit to the Grimmen Formation, the Sorthat Formation (Bornholm) and Lava Formation (Lithuania), with interfingering relationships with the Posidonia Shale in western regions. Its main equivalents include the Posidonia Shale, upper Rydeback Member (Rya Formation, southern Sweden), Fjerritslev Formation (Danish Basin), Sorthat Formation, and Lava Formation. Informal units in Poland, such as the Gryfice Beds (now fused with the Ciechocinek, Pomerania region), Lower Łysiec beds (Częstochowa region), and "Estheria series", are also correlated.

== History ==
The Ciechocinek Formation's significance was first recognized in the mid-20th century through drilling in Poland. In 1954, a borehole in Ciechocinek revealed Jurassic sediments, initially dated broadly to the Lias (Early Jurassic). In 1958, geologist Stefan Zbigniew Różycki proposed the "Seria Ciechocińska" (Ciechocinek Series) as an informal unit, describing clay-rich strata with high kaolinite content, suggesting a Late Lias age and comparing it to the Ostrowiec series (Świętokrzyskie Mountains) and Borucice Formation.

By the 1960s, the formation was formalized as "Formazaja Ciechocińska," confirmed as Lower Toarcian, with correlations to the Posidonia Shale. The 1970s established it as the Toarcian succession of the Polish Basin, and the 2000s advanced studies on its stratigraphy and paleoenvironment. The "Estheria series", identified in the 1950s in the Świętokrzyskie Mountains with Euestheria, was integrated as a subunit, reflecting limnic shore facies.

== Sedimentology ==
The Ciechocinek Formation comprises a lithological suite from a brackish-marine deltaic system in a shallow basin (>20 m deep). Key lithologies include:

- Mudstones and Siltstones: Poorly consolidated, with fine sandy lenses (1 mm–20 cm thick), except for sideritic mudstones (brown, red, olive shades).
- Claystones and Shales: High kaolinite content from tropical weathering.
- Sandstones: Quartz-rich, poorly consolidated, with chlorite and kaolinite.
- Concretions: Siderite and pyrite (up to 20 cm), with spherulites in boreholes (e.g., Brody-Lubienia). Carbonate concretions preserve fossils.
- Minerals: Kaolinite, chlorite, illite, quartz, calcite, siderite, with volcanic-derived pyrolusite from Central Skåne Volcanic Province.
- Organic Matter: Plant remains, wood fragments, charcoal, indicating wildfires.

Overlies Pliensbachian sandstones, mostly of the Drzewica Formation. Clay dominates in the elegantulum subzone, followed by fine sands (Bifrons-Thouarsense). The Estheria subunit, with paleosols, coals, and Euestheria, reflects limnic shore settings. Quiet mud and silt sedimentation from river mouths, with sand influx from storms and eustatic changes. Paleocurrents formed laminated sand-silt streaks and ripple marks. Sediments sourced from the eastern Sudetes and Cracow-Czêstochowa Monocline, with volcanic input from Central Skåne Volcanic Province.

== Paleoenvironment ==
The Ciechocinek Formation represents a shallow brackish to freshwater embayment in the Polish Basin, with lagoonal, deltaic, and marine facies. It spanned the Eastern Bohemian Massif and southwestern Fennoscandian margin, with deltas at Parkoszowice and Brody-Lubienia. Climate was Tropical to subtropical, humid, with perennial rainfall driving kaolinite formation. Milankovitch cycles and reduced kaolinite at the Tenuicostatum-Falciferum boundary suggest drier intervals linked to a Tethyan super-greenhouse event. Depositional Setting suggest Ironstone paleoenvironment with swamps, lagoons, estuaries, and low-energy deltas, resembling Caribbean systems. A central brackish-marine basin (Kaszewy Kościelne) was surrounded by lagoons and deltas. A Toarcian transgression flooded the Polish Trough, followed by regression forming lakes and mangroves. Flora was dominated by Bennettitales, Cycads, and ferns, with 80% spores (e.g., Minerisporites richardsoni) indicating humidity. Charcoal, lignites, and polycyclic aromatic hydrocarbons (e.g., phenanthrene) record six wildfire episodes post-Toarcian Anoxic Event. Euestheria, rare foraminifera, and trace fossils (Planolites, Palaeophycus) reflect brackish conditions. Upper levels show reduced salinity due to fluvial input. Equivalent formations in Germany (e.g., Grimmen Formation) yield diverse insects and dinosaur remains. Negative 13C anomalies indicate warming, with enhanced erosion delivering diverse minerals. Organic carbon reflects terrestrial burial, decoupled from global climate shifts.

== Paleobiota ==
=== Foraminifera ===
Genus	Species	Location	Abundance	Notes
Ammobaculites	A. vetusta, A. linea	Mechowo 1 Borehole	Abundant	Marine foraminiferan, Ammomarginulininae
Ammodiscus	A. glumaceous, A. orbis	Pabianice, Łutowiec, Żarki	Rare	Marine foraminiferan, Ammodiscinae
Citharina	C. sp.	Boża Wola, Gorzów Wiepolski	Rare	Marine foraminiferan, Vaginulininae
Crithionina	C. sp.	Aleksandrów I Borehole, Gorzów Wiepolski	Rare	Marine foraminiferan, Saccamminidae
Haplophragmoides	H. tryssa, H. platus	Aleksandrów I Borehole, Gorzów Wiepolski	Rare	Marine foraminiferan, Lituoloidea

=== Dinoflagellates ===
Genus	Species	Location	Abundance	Notes
Luehndea	L. spinosa	Kozłowice Clay Pit, Boroszów	Abundant	Marine dinoflagellate, Luehndeoideae
Nannoceratopsis	N. senex, N. triceras	Kozłowice Clay Pit, Boroszów	Dominant	Marine dinoflagellate, Nannoceratopsiaceae

=== Fungi ===
Genus	Species	Location	Notes
Xylophagous Fungi	Morphotypes A-G	Brody-Lubienia, Gorzów Wielkopolski	Saprophyte fungal spores, linked to climate-driven wood decomposition

=== Invertebrates ===
Genus	Species	Location	Notes
Diplocraterion	D. parallelum	Kozłowice Clay Pit, Boroszów, Parkoszowice 58 BN, Gorzków BN	U-shaped vertical burrows (Domichnia), likely by Polychaeta or Sipunculans
Gyrochorte	G. isp.	Kozłowice Clay Pit, Boroszów	Winding, horizontal double-ridge burrows (Fodinichnia), by Polychaeta (e.g., Pectinaria)
Helminthopsis	H. isp.	Kozłowice Clay Pit, Boroszów	Simple, horizontal grazing trails (Fodinichnia), by Polychaeta or Priapulida
Palaeophycus	P. tubularis	Kozłowice Clay Pit, Boroszów	Straight or curved tubular burrows (Domichnia), by Polychaeta or insects
Planolites	P. montanus, P. beverleyensis	Kozłowice Clay Pit, Boroszów	Common curved cylindrical traces (Pascichnia), by Polychaeta deposit-feeders
Protovirgularia	P. isp.	Kozłowice Clay Pit, Boroszów	Bilobate traces (Pascichnia), by Bivalvia or Branchiopoda
Spongeliomorpha	S. isp.	Kozłowice Clay Pit, Boroszów, Pawłowice 40 Borehole	Storm-filled, striated tunnels (Repichnia/Fodinichnia), by Crustacea (e.g., Anomura)
Teichichnus	Teichichnus isp.	Gorzów Wielkopolski IG 1 Borehole	Vertical spreite burrows (Fodinichnia), by Echiura or Holothurians

==== Annelida ====
Genus	Species	Location	Notes
Dictyothylakos	D. pesslerae	Brody-Lubienia, Ciechocinek	Freshwater Clitellata cocoons, resembles leech cocoons

==== Bivalvia ====
Genus	Species	Location	Notes
Eolamprotula	E. cremeri	Żarnów, Wąsosz	Freshwater mussel, Unionidae
Meleagrinella	M. substriata	Gorzow Wielkopolski, Kozłowice	Saltwater scallop, Oxytomidae

==== Crustacea ====
Genus	Species	Location	Notes
Euestheria	E. opalina, E. minuta	Kozlowice, Boroszów	Freshwater clam shrimp, Lioestheriidae
Liasina	L. lanceolata	Żuki, Gorzków	Marine ostracodan, Pontocyprididae

=== Vertebrates ===
Genus	Species	Location	Notes
Ceratodus	C. sp.	Gorzów Wielkopolski	Freshwater lungfish, Ceratodontidae
Hybodus	H. spp.	Gorzów Wielkopolski	Marine shark, Hybodontiformes
Saurichthys?	S. spp.	Gorzów Wielkopolski	Marine Fish, Saurichthyidae

== Plantae ==
The Łęka Coal Basin, known since 1800, hosts Pliensbachian-Toarcian coals from nearshore deposition in the Blanowice Formation. Biomolecules like labdanoic acid and ferruginol occur in the Mrzygłód clay-pit and boreholes (e.g., Wysoka Lelowska 47Ż). These sub-bituminous coals (%Rr 0.47–0.56) show high vitrinite and inertinite, evidencing wildfires. The Kaszewy coals (~150 m, Kaszewy-1 borehole) in a nearshore-deltaic setting contain charcoal and polycyclic aromatic hydrocarbons, linked to Toarcian wildfires and the anoxic event. Fossil resins from Jaworznik 124Ż and Blanowice coals contain sesqui- and diterpenoids from conifers (e.g., Pinaceae, Cupressaceae), associated with Pliensbachian/Toarcian wildfires and peat fires.

=== Floral Remains ===
The Lower Toarcian flora, dominated by megaspores like Paxillitriletes phyllicus (Isoetales), reflects a warm, humid climate during the Toarcian anoxic event, shifting from Pliensbachian pollen to megaspores due to a global transgression. Blanowice coals yield fossil wood, likely Agathoxylon. The Lublin upland flora includes cycads, Bennettitales, and ferns, with some reworked Carboniferous material.

==== Taxa Summary ====
Spores like Cingulatisporites floridus (Anthocerotaceae) and Rogalskaisporites cicatricosus (Sphagnopsida) indicate humid moss-rich environments. Abundant megaspores, e.g., Paxillitriletes phyllicus (Isoetales) and Acanthotriletes levidensis (Selaginellaceae), reflect water-dependent flora. Spores such as Florinisporites ovatus (Equisetopsida) suggest horsetails in humid settings. Fern spores, including Cyathidites minor (Cyatheaceae) and Todisporites hartzi (Osmundaceae), indicate diverse ferns in fluvial and deltaic environments.

Pollen like Bennettistemon bursigerum (Williamsoniaceae) and Chasmatosporites apertus (Zamiaceae) points to cycads and Bennettitales. Ginkgocycadophytus nitidus (Ginkgoaceae) and Eucommiidites troedssonii (Erdtmanithecales) suggests ginkgo-like and gnetophyte flora. Conifer remains, including Agathoxylon agathiforme (Araucariaceae) wood and pollen like Araucariacites australis and Pityosporites haploxylon (Pinaceae), indicate dominant coniferous forests.

== See also ==
- List of fossiliferous stratigraphic units in Poland
- Toarcian turnover
- Toarcian formations
- Blue Lias, England
- Charmouth Mudstone Formation, England
- Jurensismergel Formation, Germany
- Posidonia Shale, Germany
- Sorthat Formation, Denmark
- Hasle Formation, Denmark
- Zagaje Formation, Poland
- Drzewica Formation, Poland
- Borucice Formation, Poland
- Rotzo Formation, Italy
- Saltrio Formation, Italy
- Moltrasio Formation, Italy
- Marne di Monte Serrone, Italy
- Calcare di Sogno, Italy
- Podpeč Limestone, Slovenia
- Coimbra Formation, Portugal
- El Pedregal Formation, Spain
- Fernie Formation, Canada
- Whiteaves Formation, British Columbia
- Navajo Sandstone, Utah
- Ziliujing Formation, China
- Yanan Formation, China
- Aganane Formation, Morocco
- Tafraout Group, Morocco
- Azilal Formation, Morocco
- Budoš Limestone, Montenegro
- Kota Formation, India
- Cañadón Asfalto Formation, Argentina
- Los Molles Formation, Argentina
- Kandreho Formation, Madagascar
- Elliot Formation, South Africa
- Clarens Formation, South Africa
- Evergreen Formation, Australia
- Cattamarra Coal Measures, Australia
- Hanson Formation, Antarctica
- Mawson Formation, Antarctica
