= Cattamarra Coal Measures =

Geological unit in Western Australia

- Stratigraphic range: Pliensbachian-Aalenian; ~190–172 Ma
- Type: Geological formation
- Sub-units: Bitter Pool Claystone
- Underlies: Cadda & Yarragadee Formations
- Overlies: Eneabba Formation, Lesueur Sandstone
- Thickness: 1,500 m (4,900 ft)

Lithology
- Primary: Sandstone
- Other: Siltstone, claystone, coal

Location
- Coordinates: 30.3°S 115.2°E
- Approximate paleocoordinates: 39.3°S 56.2°E
- Region: Western Australia
- Country: Australia
- Extent: Perth Basin
- Cattamarra Coal Measures (Australia)

The Cattamarra Coal Measures is an Early Jurassic geological unit in Western Australia.

== Description ==
They are part of the Perth Basin, and are a sequence of non-marine, probably fluvial sandstones, shales and silts including bituminous coal, and are up to 300 m thick. The Cattamarra Coal Measures conformably overly the Eneabba Formation.

The Cattamarra Coal Measures constitute an unconventional tight gas reservoir.

There are well preserved fossil insects from the Jurassic age in the deposit.

== See also ==
- Toarcian turnover
- Toarcian formations
  - Marne di Monte Serrone, Italy
  - Calcare di Sogno, Italy
  - Sachrang Formation, Austria
  - Posidonia Shale, Lagerstätte in Germany
  - Ciechocinek Formation, Germany and Poland
  - Krempachy Marl Formation, Poland and Slovakia
  - Lava Formation, Lithuania
  - Azilal Group, North Africa
  - Whitby Mudstone, England
  - Fernie Formation, Alberta and British Columbia
    - Poker Chip Shale
  - Whiteaves Formation, British Columbia
  - Navajo Sandstone, Utah
  - Los Molles Formation, Argentina
  - Mawson Formation, Antarctica
  - Kandreho Formation, Madagascar
  - Kota Formation, India
  - Unconventional (oil & gas) reservoir
