= Fernie Formation =

Stratigraphic Unit in Western Canada

- Stratigraphic range: Jurassic; ~200–145 Ma
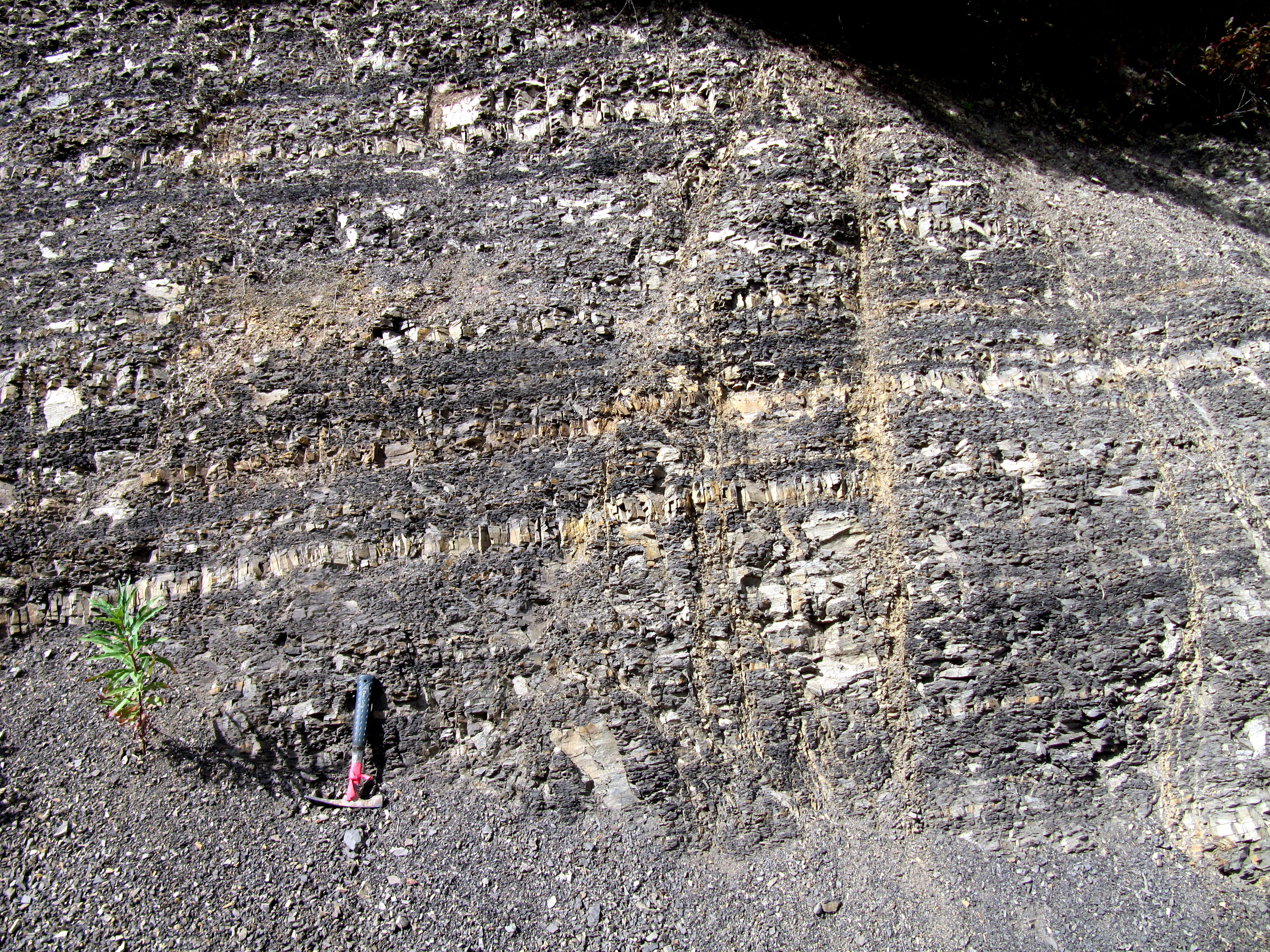
- Fernie Formation shale exposed in a roadcut near Sparwood, British Columbia
- Type: Geological formation
- Sub-units: Nordegg Member, Red Deer Member, Poker Chip Shale, Lille Member, Rock Creek Member, Highwood Member, Pigeon Creek Member, Ribbon Creek Member
- Underlies: Morrissey Formation, Nikanassin Formation, Monteith Formation
- Overlies: Schooler Creek Group, Montney Formation, Rundle Group
- Thickness: up to 400 metres (1,310 ft)

Lithology
- Primary: Shale
- Other: Sandstone, siltstone, limestone

Location
- Coordinates: 49.55°N 115.16°W
- Region: Alberta; British Columbia
- Country: Canada

Type section
- Named for: Fernie, British Columbia
- Named by: W.W. Leach
- Year defined: 1914
- Fernie Formation (Canada) Fernie Formation (British Columbia)

The Fernie Formation is a stratigraphic unit of Jurassic age. It is present in the western part of the Western Canada Sedimentary Basin in western Alberta and northeastern British Columbia. It takes its name from the town of Fernie, British Columbia, and was first defined by W.W. Leach in 1914.

== Depositional history ==
The Fernie Formation consists of marine sediments that were deposited in the Sundance Sea. Deposition took place throughout most of the Jurassic period, starting during the Hettangian stage in some parts of northeastern British Columbia and continuing until the mid-Tithonian, as determined from its fossil assemblages, including ammonites, molluscs and microfossils.

The sediments were sourced from the east during the deposition of the lower and middle units of the Fernie, where the coarser facies occur in the eastern part of the formation. In the uppermost Fernie, the coarsest material is found in the west, however, indicating a shift to sources in the west and south.

== Lithology ==
The Fernie Formation is composed primarily of brown and dark gray to black shales that range from massive with conchoidal fracture to laminated and highly fractured or papery. Phosphatic sandstone and limestone, including cherty limestone, occur locally in the lower parts of the formation; siltstone, sandstone, coquinas and oolitic limestone interbeds can occur in the center; glauconitic sandstone and siltstone can be present in the upper parts.

== Distribution ==
The Fernie Formation reaches a maximum thickness of 400 metres (1,310 ft) near Mount Allan in Alberta, and typically is about 70 to 150m (230 to 492 ft) thick. It thins toward the east, disappearing at about the longitude of Calgary. The formation is exposed in outcrops in the Kootenay region of southeastern British Columbia, in the foothills and front ranges of the Canadian Rockies in southwestern Alberta, and as far north as the Peace River Country in northeastern British Columbia.

== Relationship to other units ==
The Fernie Formation is conformably overlain by the Morrissey Formation in the south, by the Nikanassin Formation in central Alberta and by the Monteith Formation in northeastern British Columbia. It rests disconformably on Triassic units in the west, and unconformably on upper Paleozoic units such as the Schooler Creek Group and the Montney Formation farther east.

=== Subdivisions ===
The Fernie Formation has the following subdivisions from top to base:

Sub-unit	Age	Lithology	Reference
Passage Beds	Oxfordian to Tithonian	dark grey splintery shale interbedded with siltstone	
Ribbon Creek Member	Bathonian	silty shale	
Green Beds	Oxfordian	glauconitic sandy mudstone, calcareous and phosphatic concretions	
Grey Beds	Callovian	dark platy shale with ammonites and concretions	
Gryphaea Bed	Bathonian	coquina with shells of Gryphaea impressimarginata, ammonites and belemnites; calcareous siltstone	
Corbula munda Beds	Bathonian	silty shale, calcareous sandstone	
Pigeon Creek Member	Callovian	calcareous siltstone and grey shale	
Highwood Member	Bajocian	dark grey shale, bioturbated sandstone	
Rock Creek Member	Bajocian	also called "Belemnite zone" - fine-grained grey sandstone that may contain commercial gas reserves	
Lille Member	Bajocian	coquina with Gryphaea and Ostrea shells	
Poker Chip Shale	Toarcian	fissile black calcareous shale, thin-bedded black argillaceous limestone	
Red Deer Member	Pliensbachian	black shale, black laminated limestone	
Oxytoma Bed	Sinemurian	coquina with Oxytoma shells	
Nordegg Member	Sinemurian	dark cherty and phosphatic limestone, calcareous shale	

== See also ==
- List of fossiliferous stratigraphic units in Alberta
- List of fossiliferous stratigraphic units in British Columbia
- Toarcian turnover
- Toarcian formations
  - Marne di Monte Serrone, Italy
  - Calcare di Sogno, Italy
  - Sachrang Formation, Austria
  - Posidonia Shale, Lagerstätte in Germany
  - Ciechocinek Formation, Germany and Poland
  - Krempachy Marl Formation, Poland and Slovakia
  - Lava Formation, Lithuania
  - Azilal Group, North Africa
  - Whitby Mudstone, England
  - Whiteaves Formation, British Columbia
  - Navajo Sandstone, Utah
  - Los Molles Formation, Argentina
  - Mawson Formation, Antarctica
  - Kandreho Formation, Madagascar
  - Kota Formation, India
  - Cattamarra Coal Measures, Australia
