= Marne di Monte Serrone =

Geological formation in Italy

- Stratigraphic range: Early Toarcian; ~181–179 Ma
- Type: Geological formation
- Sub-units: Valdorbia, Colle d'Orlando, Pale Vallone & Pozzale Sections
- Underlies: Rosso Ammonitico, Calcari e Marne a Posidonia & Calcari Diasprigni Formations
- Overlies: Corniola & Calcare Massicio Formations
- Thickness: 64–80 m (210–262 ft)

Lithology
- Primary: Calcilutites & clay-rich greenish marls with calcareous lenses
- Other: Argillaceous gray green marls with calcarenites alternated with marls

Location
- Coordinates: 42°59′30.1″N 12°50′58.2″E
- Region: Umbria
- Country: Italy
- Extent: Umbria-Marche Basin

Type section
- Named for: Monte Serrone
- Named by: Pialli
- Year defined: 1969
- Marne di Monte Serrone (Italy)

The Marne di Monte Serrone ("Monte Serrone Marl") is a geological formation in Italy, dating to roughly between 181 and 178 million years ago, and covering the early and middle Toarcian stage of the Jurassic Period of central Italy. It is the regional equivalent to the Toarcian units of Spain such as the Turmiel Formation, units in Montenegro, such as the Budoš Limestone and units like the Tafraout Formation of Morocco.

== Description ==
The Marne di Monte Serrone was first defined by Pialli in 1969. Represents mostly a marginal marine, from intertidal to hemipelagic unit, with several different depositional settings recovered on it. The lithology and sedimentology of the unit reflect the different positions within the Umbria-Marche Basin, where the layers located towards Pozzale are of typical hemipelagic nature, lacking proper amounts of carbonate sediments. By contrast, towards Colle d’orlando and Fonte Cerro areas the influence of a nearby emerged landmass is evident, based on the amount of reworked calcareous sediments. This terrigenous material was likely derived from the nearby Lazio-Abruzzo Platform, where likely a significant amount of terrigenous residue developed as Terra Rossa deposited, likely on island settings.

The formation is characterised for be one of the most complete sections to measure the chaggues of the marine microbiota of the Toarcian around Europe. It is also one of the best places on southern Europe where the strata shows the effects of the Lower Toarcian anoxic event (T-OAE). The formation also provides data about the changes after the Toarcian AE, with changes on the deposited micritic limestones and marls, what shows a local sedimentary response to the Toarcian climatic perturbation induced by the Vulcanism of the Southern Karoo-Ferrar that boiled the carbon cycle and change the mechanism of Earth climate. The dawn after the Toarcian AE is presented locally by changes on the environments, to more seashore to lagoonal ones.

=== Depositional environment ===
The environment of the formation has been compared to the present on the Toarcian Betic Cordillera strata, with a corridor of pelagic environments with influence from emerged reliefs. Other sections are related to nearby emerged lands, seashore deposits and even inland deposition, due to the changes in lithology (especially with the clay minerals kaolinite and smectite). Due to that, the main depositional layers of the formation are believed to come from an environment intermediate between pelagic and nearshore settings.

Due to the influence of different depositional settings, the lithology of the formation was widely distributed, with changes on the mineralological composition. The clay Mineral assemblages, with the neritic sedimentation, expose a change on the deposition, as it can be seen on the Valdorbia Section, where on the Middle Toarcian the reduction of this minerals indicate a sea-level fall, with a change from a bathyal to a middle shelf environment. Additionally there is a record of changes on the fauna, specially bivalves that suggests a variable flow regime at the major wave base as a result of a storm event.

== Fossil content ==
The biota of the formation comprise mostly marine microinvertebrates and algae, with the presence of ammonites and abundant pollen in the Middle Toarcian sections. Nanoplankton is one of the most representative finds of the layers, appearing deposited with interruptions, probably due to changes on the oxygen content of the sea floor. Phytoplankton includes abundant dinoflagellate cysts and acritarchs, specially the genus Micrhystridium. There registered a transgression on the sea level on the Lower Toarcian, with a rise, giving the Umbria-Marche Basin pelagic conditions, and a regression during the Middle Toarcian. Those changes implicate the disappearance of genera of dinoflagellates from the strata to be replaced with new ones. Some dinoflagellate genera such as Mendicodinium are more abundant, being the dominant palynological residue recovered in some samples.

Foraminiferal analysis had been done, revealing changes in the salinity, with Spirillina as the most abundant genus found, followed by Prodentalina, Eoguttulina, Lenticulina, Nodosaria, Lingulonodosaria and Pseudonodosaria. Invertebrate remains are mainly brachiopods (Pseudokingena, Nannirhynchia and Lokutella, among others) and ammonites; Eodactylites, Pleuroceras, Canavaria, Trinacrioceras, Lioceratoides, and Praepolyplectus as predominant genera.

Other marine fauna includes Holothuriidan Sclerites, unidentified crinoids, fragmentary asteroideans and fish teeth & complete specimens, including the genus Leptolepis.

There are terrestrial fossils and sediments, specially clay. The main source area for the clay could have been the palaeosoils developed on the Carbonate Latium-Abruzzo Platform, although more recent studies prove a continental origin. The Main fossils from terrestrial deposits are plant Pollen, mostly Pteridophyta spores and Circumpolles, and Palynomacerals. The genera includes Leptolepidites (Lycopsida) spp., Trilites (Filicopsida) spp., Ischyosporites (Pteridopsida) spp. or Foveosporites (Selaginellaceae) spp. and others less abundant, such as the genus Callialasporites (Coniferales). There is a curious reduction of the Cheirolepidiaceae genus Classopollis, abundant on coeval associations from northern Europe, Portugal, northeast Italy and Israel, as a possible effect of paleoclimatic changes.

=== Megaflora ===
Several plant leaves and fragments of wood were not identified.

Genus	Species	Stratigraphic position	Material	Notes	Images
Brachyphyllum	B. spp.	Mount Palombo, Marsica	Branched Shoots	Affinities with the Cheirolepidiaceae and Araucariaceae. Usually linked with coastal settings as shrub-alike conifers	
Cycadopteris	C. spp.	Mount Palombo, Marsica	Leaflets	Affinities with Corystospermales inside Pteridospermopsida.	
Dactylethrophyllum	D. cf.peristictum	Mount Palombo, Marsica	Branched Shoots	Affinities with Cheirolepidiaceae inside Coniferales.	
Otozamites	O. molinianus	Mount Palombo, Marsica	Leaflets	Affinities with Williamsoniaceae inside Bennettitales. Overall, the genus Otozamites is among the most abundant flora genus recovered	
Pagiophyllum	P. cf. revoltinum; P. cf. veronense	Mount Palombo, Marsica	Branched Shoots	Affinities with the Cheirolepidiaceae and Araucariaceae. Arbustive to arboreal plants with several leaf morphotypes, probably from nearshore environments.	
Sphenozamites	S. rossii	Mount Palombo, Marsica	Leaflets	Affinities with Williamsoniaceae inside Bennettitales. Related with Cycad-like trees.	
Taeniopteris	T. spp.	Mount Palombo, Marsica	Leaflets	Affinities with either Williamsoniaceae inside Bennettitales or Pentoxylales. Leafs related with plans of suggested habit similar to that of brambles	

== See also ==
- Tafraout Group, North Africa
- Aganane Formation, North Africa
- Calcaires du Bou Dahar, North Africa
- Calcare di Sogno, Italy
- El Pedregal Formation, Spain
- Mizur Formation, North Caucasus
- Cattamarra Coal Measures, Australia
- Djupadal Formation, Central Skane
- Ciechocinek Formation, Germany and Poland
- Irlbach Sandstone, Germany
- Fernie Formation, Alberta and British Columbia
  - Poker Chip Shale
- Kandreho Formation, Madagascar
- Kota Formation, India
- Krempachy Marl Formation, Poland and Slovakia
- Lava Formation, Lithuania
- List of fossiliferous stratigraphic units in Italy
- Los Molles Formation, Argentina
- Mawson Formation, Antarctica
- Navajo Sandstone, Utah
- Posidonia Shale, Lagerstätte in Germany
- Saubach Formation, Austria
- Sachrang Formation, Austria
- Whitby Mudstone, England
- Whiteaves Formation, British Columbia
- Category:Toarcian Stage
