= Los Molles Formation =

Geologic formation of the Early to Middle Jurassic

- Stratigraphic range: Pliensbachian-Callovian; ~185–165 Ma
- Type: Geological formation
- Unit of: Cuyo Group
- Underlies: Niyeu–Lajas Formation
- Overlies: Lajoa Formation

Lithology
- Primary: Organic shale
- Other: Lime-mudstone

Location
- Coordinates: 39°10′18″S 69°39′35″W
- Approximate paleocoordinates: 36.9°S 31.1°W
- Region: Mendoza Province; Neuquén Province
- Country: Argentina
- Extent: Neuquén Basin

Type section
- Country: Argentina
- Los Molles Formation (Argentina)

The Los Molles Formation is a geologic formation of Early to Middle Jurassic age, located at northern and central part of Neuquén Basin at Mendoza Shelf in Argentina. It is overlain by the Niyeu–Lajas Formation.

== Description ==
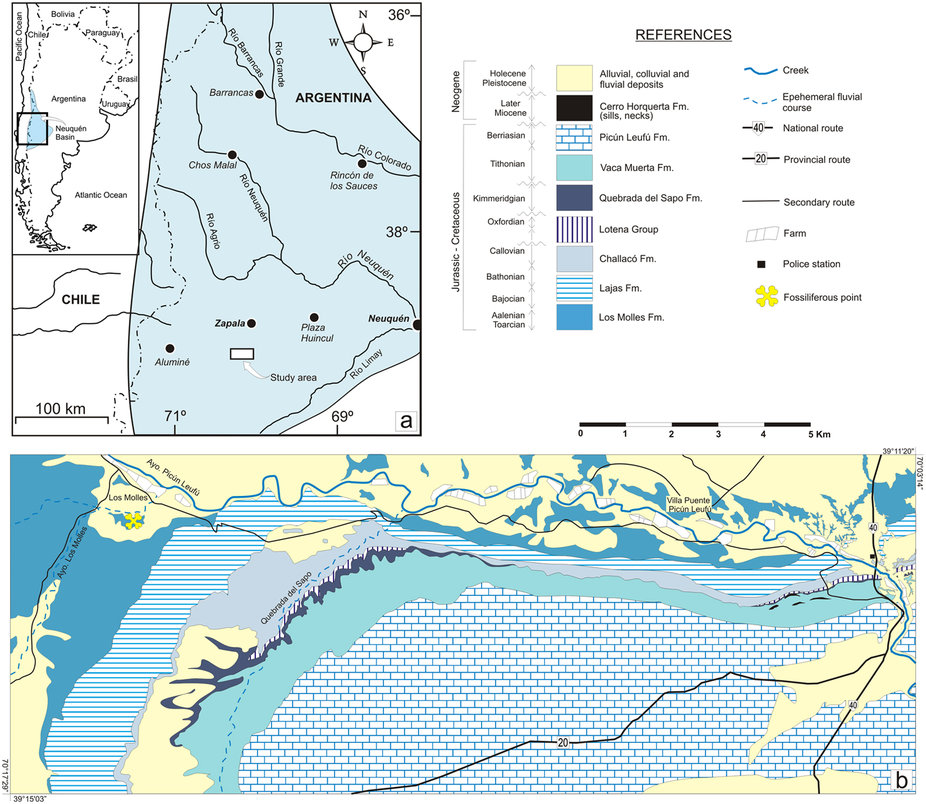
Outcrop map of the formation

It is the second largest oil and gas formation in the Neuquén Basin after the Vaca Muerta. Los Molles Formation is estimated to have 275 trillion cubic feet (7.8×10^{12} m^{3}) of technically recoverable shale gas and 3.7 billion barrels (590,000,000 m^{3}) of technically recoverable oil. In July 2015, the Buenos Aires Herald indicated that Pan American Energy and YPF planned to drill 46 shale gas wells in Los Molles over the next four years in their Lindero Atravesado drilling block, at an estimated cost of US$590 million.

== Fossil content ==
In several outcrops, the Los Molles formation has been the site of paleontological discoveries: the ichthyosaurs Chacaicosaurus and Mollesaurus, and, in 2017, an ornithischian, Isaberrysaura, discovered with fossilized contents of the gut.

== See also ==
- Vaca Muerta
- List of dinosaur bearing rock formations
- Toarcian turnover
- Toarcian formations
  - Marne di Monte Serrone, Italy
  - Calcare di Sogno, Italy
  - El Pedregal Formation, Spain
  - Sachrang Formation, Austria
  - Posidonia Shale, Lagerstätte in Germany
  - Ciechocinek Formation, Germany and Poland
  - Krempachy Marl Formation, Poland and Slovakia
  - Lava Formation, Lithuania
  - Azilal Group, North Africa
  - Whitby Mudstone, England
  - Fernie Formation, Alberta and British Columbia
    - Poker Chip Shale
  - Whiteaves Formation, British Columbia
  - Navajo Sandstone, Utah
  - Mawson Formation, Antarctica
  - Kandreho Formation, Madagascar
  - Kota Formation, India
  - Cattamarra Coal Measures, Australia
