= Whiteaves Formation =

Geologic group in Canada

- Stratigraphic range: Toarcian
- Type: Formation

Location
- Region: British Columbia
- Country: Canada

The Whiteaves Formation is a geologic formation in British Columbia. It preserves fossils dating back to the Jurassic period.

== See also ==
- List of fossiliferous stratigraphic units in Italy
- Toarcian turnover
- Toarcian formations
  - Marne di Monte Serrone, Italy
  - Calcare di Sogno, Italy
  - Sachrang Formation, Austria
  - Saubach Formation, Austria
  - Posidonia Shale, Lagerstätte in Germany
  - Ciechocinek Formation, Germany and Poland
  - Krempachy Marl Formation, Poland and Slovakia
  - Lava Formation, Lithuania
  - Azilal Group, North Africa
  - Whitby Mudstone, England
  - Fernie Formation, Alberta and British Columbia
    - Poker Chip Shale
  - Navajo Sandstone, Utah
  - Los Molles Formation, Argentina
  - Mawson Formation, Antarctica
  - Kandreho Formation, Madagascar
  - Kota Formation, India
  - Cattamarra Coal Measures, Australia
