= Grimmen Formation =

Jurassic geologic formation in Germany

- Stratigraphic range: Lower Toarcian; ~182–179 Ma Tenuicostatum-Exaratum
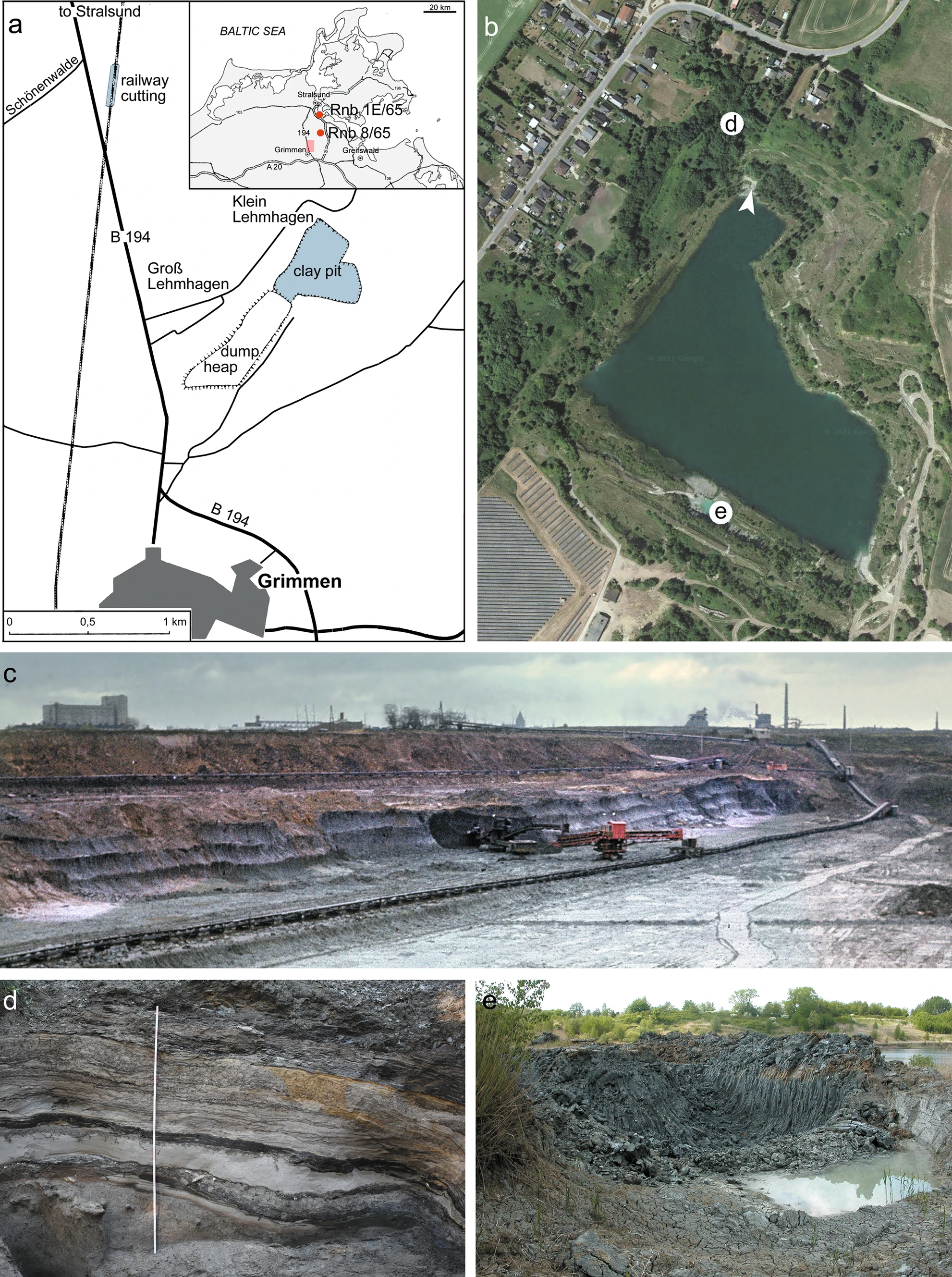
- Clay pit outcrop near Grimmen
- Type: Geological formation
- Unit of: Kamienna Group
- Underlies: Glashütte Formation, Dörnten Member (Posidonia Shale Formation)
- Overlies: Posidonia Shale Formation, Wolgast Formation
- Thickness: Up to 100 m (330 ft)

Lithology
- Primary: Claystone, Siltstone
- Other: Mudstone, fine-grained Sandstone, Siderite and carbonate concretions

Location
- Region: Mecklenburg-Vorpommern
- Country: Germany
- Extent: North German Basin

Type section
- Named for: Grimmen, Germany

The Grimmen Formation is a Lower Jurassic (Toarcian) geological formation in northeastern Germany, primarily exposed in the Grimmen and Klein Lehmhagen clay pits and documented in wells such as Reinberg 1E. Formally established in 2025, it was previously part of the informal "Green Series" of the Ciechocinek Formation. It represents a prodelta to brackish-marine depositional system in the eastern North German Basin (NGB), shaped by sea-level changes and the Toarcian anoxic event.

== History ==
Studies of Toarcian strata near Grimmen began in 1874 with the discovery of fossiliferous clays in a railway cutting near Schönenwalde, 5 km north of Grimmen, initially misidentified as Middle Jurassic due to ammonite finds. In 1909, the succession was reclassified as Lower Toarcian (Lias epsilon), distinct from the Posidonia Shale Formation. From 1959 to 1995, the Grimmen clay pit was excavated, revealing a glacially dislocated raft of Liassic clays and sands deformed by Pleistocene ice advances. Exploration wells (e.g., Reinberg 1E, Kb Barth 10, Kb Grambow 5) since the 1950s provided extensive core data, with Reinberg 1E designated as the reference section in 2025. The clay pit, abandoned and water-filled since 1995, was established as the type section in 2025, with 2016 and 2020 excavations refining an 18 m composite log spanning the Pliensbachian-Toarcian boundary to the elegans Subzone.

== Sedimentology/Lithology ==
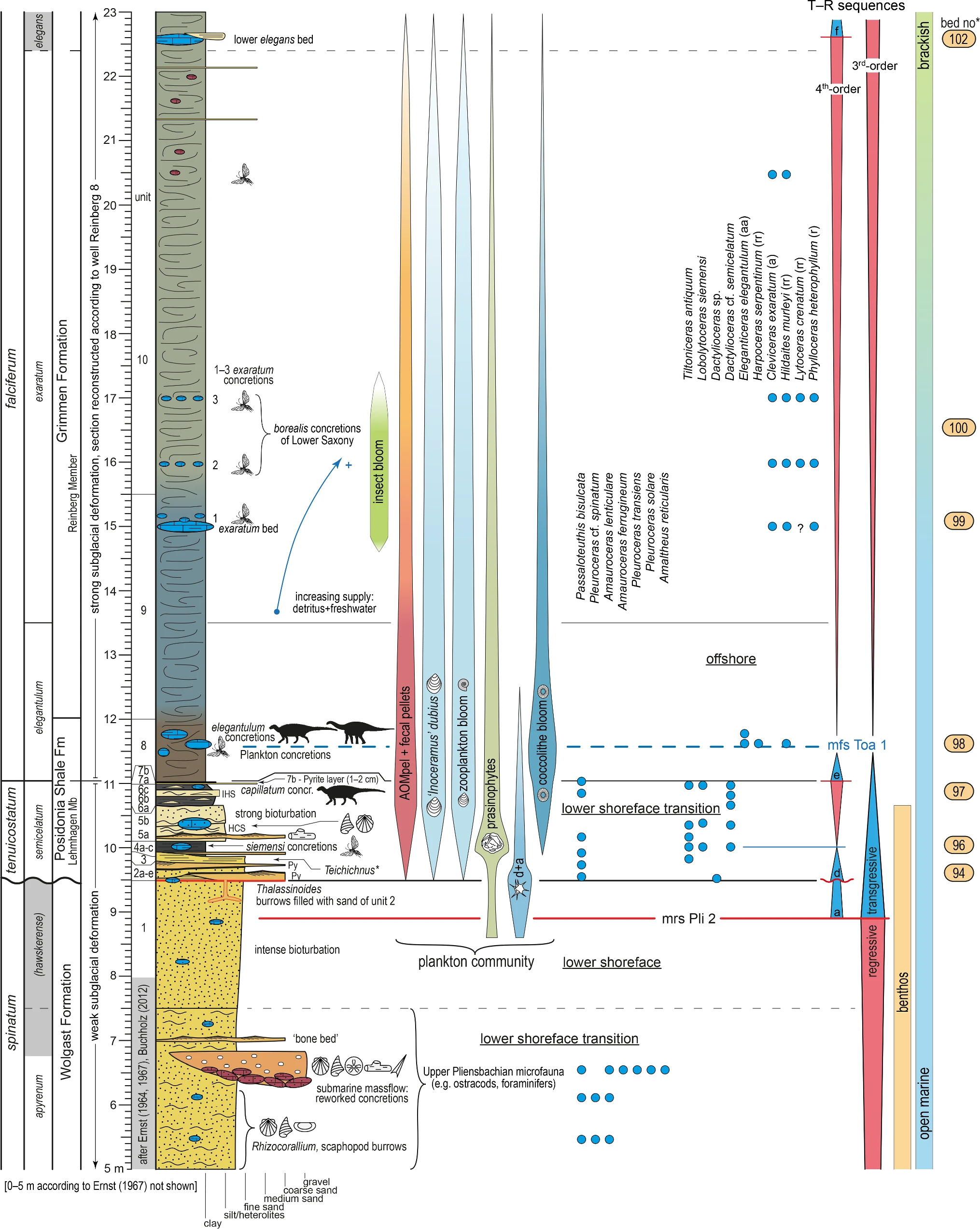
Profile at Grimmen

The Grimmen Formation comprises greenish to bluish claystones, siltstones, and fine-grained sandstones, with siderite and carbonate concretions, reaching up to 100 m thick in the eastern North German Basin. The type section in the Grimmen clay pit forms an 18 m composite log, transitioning from Pliensbachian sandy deposits of the Wolgast Formation to Toarcian organo-detrital clays and heteroliths of the Lehmhagen Member (Posidonia Shale Formation), followed by the Reinberg Member of the Grimmen Formation. The Reinberg Member (~10 m thick) starts with bluish clays, grading to greenish, pellet-laminated clays with exaratum and lower elegans marker beds (marly limestones with fecal pellets). Pellet laminae, up to 5 mm thick, decrease upsection, while silty/sandy intercalations and siderite concretions increase, forming a coarsening-upward trend with pyrite-filled burrows. The upper Grimmen Formation features greenish clays with thin silt/sand laminae in 8–15 m symmetric cycles, capped by the Glashütte Formation's deltaic sandstones. Heavy minerals (zircon, rutile, tourmaline) and smectite-group clay minerals indicate volcanogenic input, while kaolinite and chlorite are common. Glacially dislocated Eocene greensand and clay are locally intercalated. Organic-rich layers contain charcoal fragments, suggesting wildfires.

Toarcian material found in glacial Erratics in Ahrensburg and the Hagen Forest have been in controversy due to its dubious origin, being linked with the Rya Formation and Sorthat Formation, as well this unit. They were originally considered or local or Baltic in derivation, but that changued with the recovery of erratic concretions in the Baltic sea cliffs near Lübeck, being found as part of the Weichselian Glacial Maximum. Liassic–Cretaceous sediments in the assemblage are most probably associated with the tectonic Sorgenfrei-Tornquist Zone. The origin of this erratics from southwestern Baltic, Poland or Danish archipelago is unlikely, as those zones are dominated by Late Cretaceous–Paleocene strata, suggesting that this Toarcian assamblages should come from south/SW between STZ–TTZ and the German Baltic coast. The most clear hint link this deposits with the Grimmen Fm, as they're identical in fauna and facies composition of Grimmen and Dobbertin, also affected by subglacial erosion and thrusting, suggesting a close stratigraphic and palaeogeographical origin.

== Paleoenvironment ==
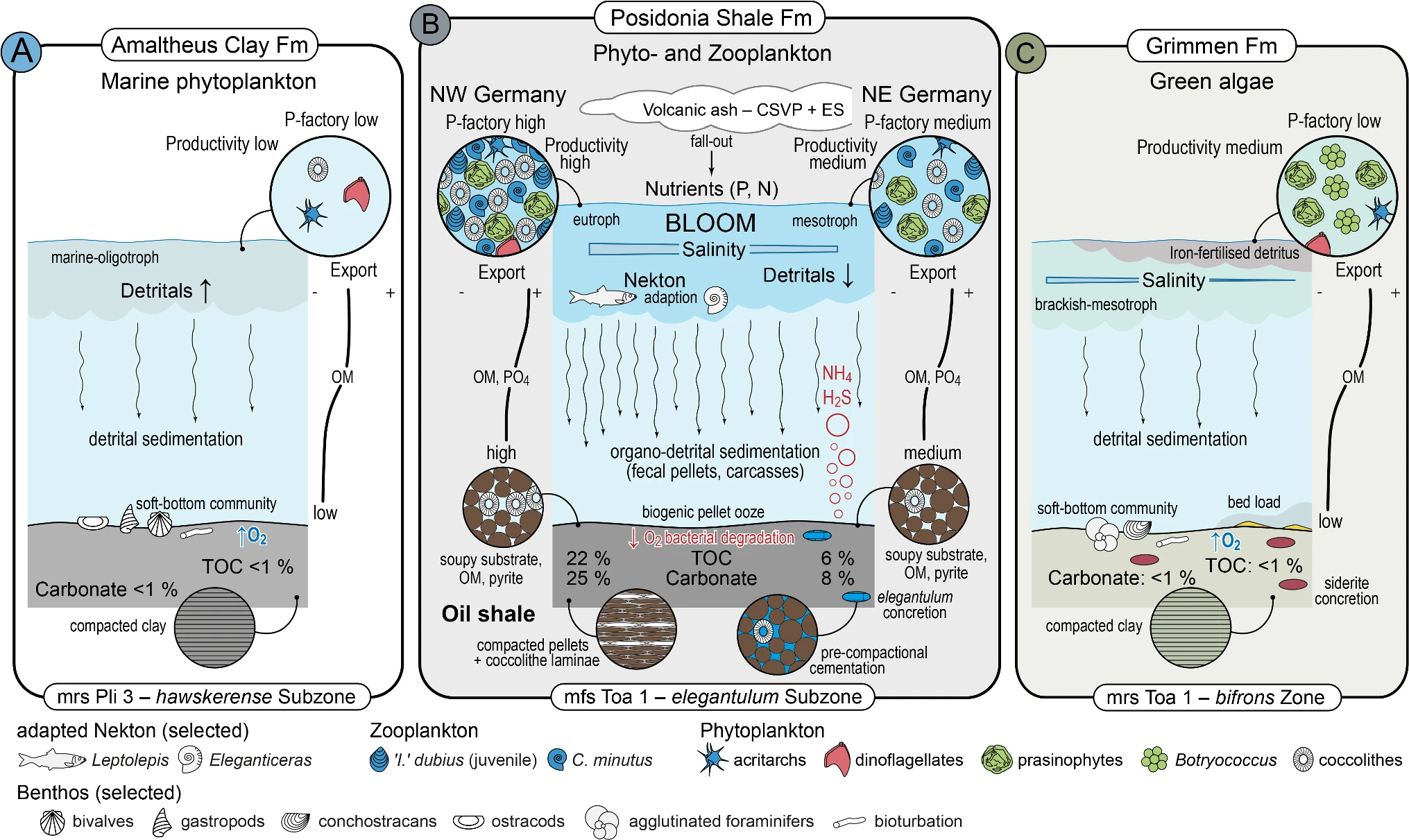
Pliensbachian–Toarcian plankton communities in the NGB

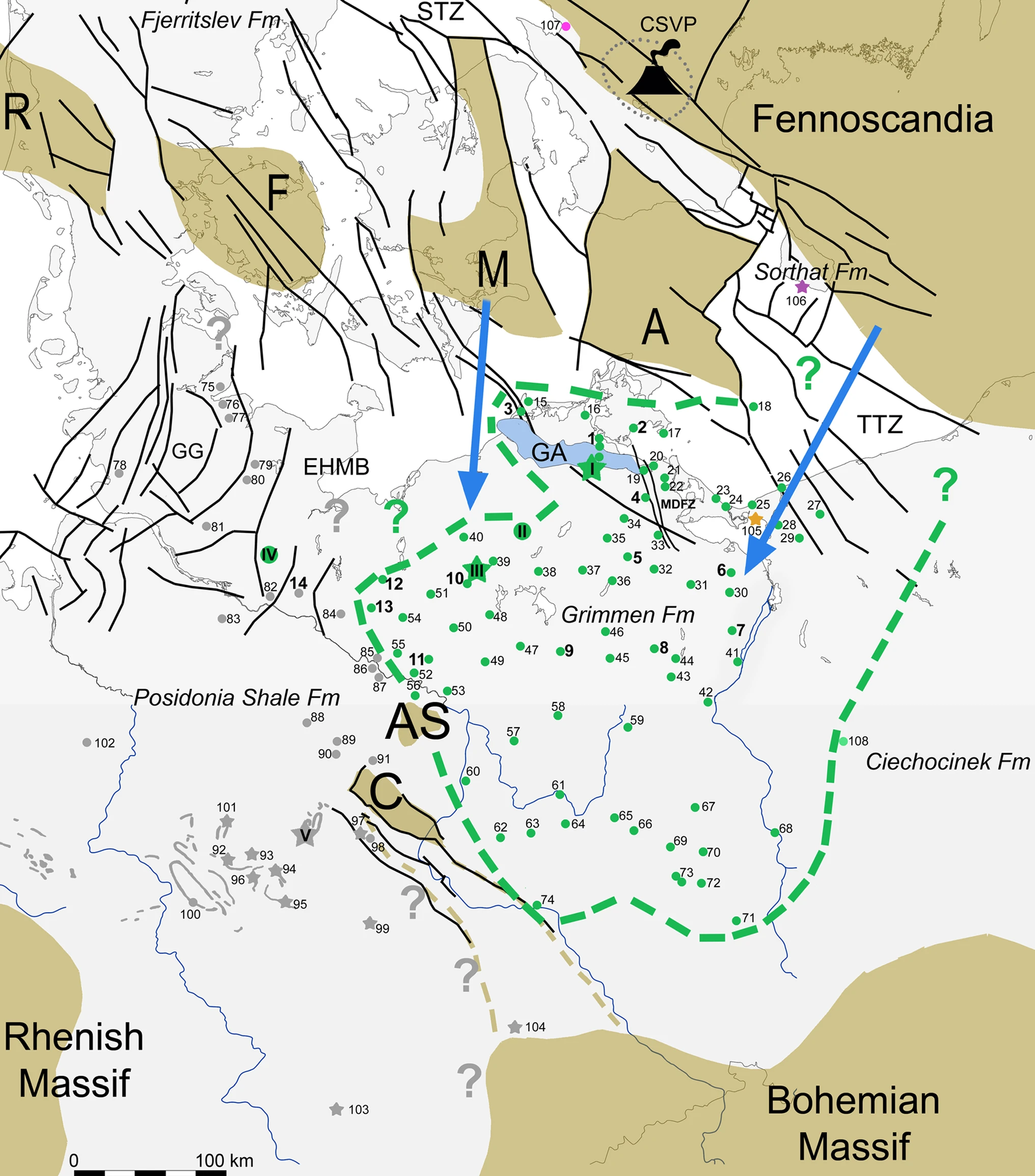
Simplified Paleogeography of the NGB in the Toarcian, with the extent of the Grimmen Formation and adjacent units

The Grimmen Formation was deposited in a prodelta to brackish-marine environment in the eastern North German Basin, influenced by sea-level changes and the Toarcian anoxic event. The Reinberg Member reflects a transition from organo-detrital Posidonia Shale Formation to brackish-marine clays, with high total organic carbon (TOC, ~3 wt%) at the base decreasing to <1 wt% upsection, indicating a shift to dysoxic conditions. Basal bluish clays (exaratum Subzone) represent a restricted marine basin, followed by greenish clays with pellet laminae, suggesting increased fluvial input and suspension-load plumes during wetter phases. The coarsening-upward trend and onset of bioturbation (pyrite-filled burrows) reflect prodelta progradation from Fennoscandia, culminating in the Glashütte Formation's deltaic systems. High kaolinite and smectite content indicate a warm, humid climate with biochemical weathering and volcanogenic influence, akin to modern tropical settings. The absence of major ripples suggests minimal wave action, with sedimentation driven by fluvial input and storm events. The formation extends from western Poland to the Ringkøbing-Fyn-Møn-Arkona High, interfingering with the Ciechocinek Formation in the east. The Grimmen Formation's biostratigraphy is primarily based on ammonite zones, with the falciferum Zone (elegantulum, exaratum, elegans, falciferum subzones) for the lower Toarcian. The type section spans the Pliensbachian-Toarcian boundary (tenuicostatum Subzone) to the elegans Subzone, with key fossils preserved in concretions and clays.

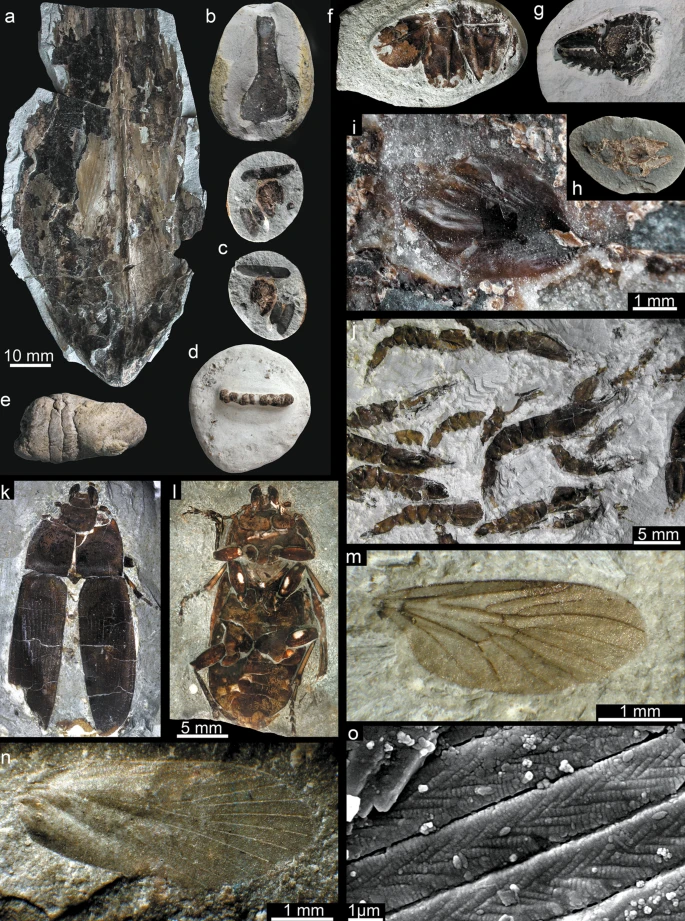
Reinberg Member biota

Ammonites define subzones, with Dactylioceras semicelatum and possible D. tenuicostatum at the boundary, followed by Lobolytoceras siemensi and Tiltoniceras antiquum in the Lehmhagen Member (semicelatum Subzone). Elegantulum concretions yield abundant Eleganticeras elegantulum and rare Hildaites murleyi, while exaratum concretions in the Reinberg Member contain Cleviceras exaratum, Phylloceras heterophyllum, and Lytoceras crenatum. Belemnites (Passaloteuthis bisulcata) are common in the semicelatum Subzone but absent from the elegantulum Subzone due to anoxia. Teuthoids and coleoids occur in elegantulum and exaratum concretions.

Holoplanktonic gastropod Coelodiscus minutus and larval 'Inoceramus' dubius are abundant, with adults in elegantulum and exaratum concretions, often in regurgitalites. Ostracods and foraminifera are absent in black shales but occur above the Dörnten Member. Calcareous nannoplankton (e.g., Rhombolithion) are diverse in the elegantulum Subzone, correlating with NJ5b–NJ6 zones. Palynofacies show a dinoflagellate cyst blackout in the elegantulum-exaratum Subzones, with amorphous organic matter (AOM) dominance and micro-charcoal. Megaspores (e.g., Paxillitriletes phyllicus) from Fennoscandia indicate a humid climate.

=== Reinberg Member Fossil Record ===
The Reinberg Member, notably at Grimmen and Dobbertin, is a Konservatlagerstätte with exceptional marine and terrestrial fossils in exaratum concretions. Ammonites (e.g., Cleviceras exaratum), Coelodiscus minutus, and 'Inoceramus' dubius are preserved in calcite, with predation traces. Decapod crustaceans (e.g., Palaeoastacus-like), coleoid gladii, and fish (leptolepids, Grimmenodon aureum) occur in calcium phosphate. Coprolites, likely from fish, sharks, and marine reptiles (e.g., ichthyosaurs, plesiosaurs), are common. Terrestrial insects, especially in exaratum concretions types 1 and 2, include well-preserved wings and rare 3D specimens, comparable to Dobbertin's fauna. These fossils, formed in anoxic, fine-grained limestone below the storm wave base, reflect a nutrient-rich environment fertilized by insect carcasses.

== Biota ==
Color key: Taxon / Reclassified taxon / Taxon falsely reported as present / Dubious taxon or junior synonym / Ichnotaxon / Ootaxon / Morphotaxon

Notes
Uncertain or tentative taxa are in small text
~~crossed out~~ taxa are discredited.

=== Foraminifera ===
Genus	Species	Location	Material	Notes	Images
Berthelinella	B. paradoxa	Dobbertin	Tests	Foraminiferan of the family Plectofrondiculariidae	
Bolivina	B. liasica	Dobbertin	Tests	Foraminiferan of the family Bolivinidae	
Cornuspira	C. orbicula	Dobbertin	Tests	Foraminiferan of the subfamily Cornuspirinae	
Dentalina	D. deslongchampsi; D. primaeva; D. pseudocommunis; D. submucronata; D. subtenuicollis; D. tenuistriata; D. torta; D. vetusta	Dobbertin	Tests	Foraminiferan of the family Nodosariidae	
Eoguttulina	E. bilocularis; E. liassica; E. cf.simplex	Dobbertin	Tests	Foraminiferan of the subfamily Polymorphininae	
Falsopalmula	F. insignis	Dobbertin	Tests	Foraminiferan of the family Robuloididae	
Frondicularia	F. bicostata; F. sulcata; F. terquemi; F. sp.	Dobbertin	Tests	Foraminiferan of the family Nodosariidae	
Glomospira	G. gordialis; G. sp.	Dobbertin	Tests	Foraminiferan of the subfamily Usbekistaniinae	
Lagena	L. globosa; L. oxystoma; L. globosa; L. tenuicostata; L. sp.	Dobbertin	Tests	Foraminiferan of the family Nodosariidae	
Lenticulina	L. acutiangulata; L. müensteri; L. varians; L. sublaevis	Dobbertin	Tests	Foraminiferan of the family Vaginulinidae	
Lingulina	L. tenera	Dobbertin	Tests	Foraminiferan of the subfamily Lingulininae	
Marginulina	M. prima; M. simplex; M. oolithica	Dobbertin	Tests	Foraminiferan of the subfamily Marginulininae	
Nodosaria	N. dispar; N. agglutinans; N. elongata; N. germanica; N. hirsuta; N. dispar; N. mitis; N. regularis; N. simplex	Dobbertin	Tests	Foraminiferan of the family Nodosariidae	
Ophtalmidium	O. orbiculare; O. carinatum; O. sp.	Dobbertin	Tests	Foraminiferan of the family Ophthalmidiidae	
Rectoglandulina	R. oviformis; R. sexcostata	Dobbertin	Tests	Foraminiferan of the family Nodosariidae	
Stilostomella	S.? sp.	Dobbertin	Tests	Foraminiferan of the family Stilostomellidae	
Trochamminoides	T. sp.	Dobbertin	Tests	Foraminiferan of the family Trochamminoidae	
Turrispirillina	T. conoidea	Dobbertin	Tests	Foraminiferan of the family Spirillinidae	
Vaginulina	V. anomala	Dobbertin	Tests	Foraminiferan of the subfamily Vaginulininae	

=== Ichnofossils ===
Genus	Species	Type	Location	Origin	Images
Chondrites	C. bollensis	Fodinichnia	Dobbertin Clay Pit	Sipunculans; Polychaetes; Enteropneustans; Echiurans	Illustration of Chondrites bollensis
Megagrapton	M. isp.	Pascichnia	Dobbertin Clay Pit	Polychaetes; Sipunculans; Enteropneustans; Echiurans	
Planolites	P. montanus; P. beverleyensis	Pascichnia	Kozłowice Clay Pit; "Boroszów" Brickyard	Polychaetes; Insects	Example of Planolites fossil
Skolithos	S. isp.	Domichnia	Müssentin gravel pit	Polychaetes; Phoronidans	
Taenidium	T. serpentinum	Fodinichnia	Dobbertin Clay Pit	Deposit-feeding Sipuncula; Polychaetes; Phoronidans	

=== Brachiopoda ===
Genus	Species	Stratigraphic position	Material	Notes	Images
Discina	D. cornucopiae; D. papyracea; D. sp.	Klein Lehmhagen pit, Grimmen; Dobbertin	Shells	A saltwater brachiopod, member of Discinidae inside Discinida.	

=== Bivalvia ===
Genus	Species	Stratigraphic position	Material	Notes	Images
Bositra	B. buchii; B. radiata	Klein Lehmhagen pit, Grimmen; Dobbertin; Ahrensburg	Shells	A saltwater oyster, member of Posidoniidae.	Specimens on a matrix
Goniomya	G. rhombifera	Klein Lehmhagen pit, Grimmen; Dobbertin	Shells	A saltwater clam, member of Pholadomyidae.	
Gresslya	G. sp.	Ahrensburg	Shells	A saltwater clam, member of Ceratomyidae.	
Lucina	L. plana	Klein Lehmhagen pit, Grimmen; Dobbertin	Shells	A saltwater clam, member of Lucinidae.	Lucina
Meleagrinella	M. substriata	Klein Lehmhagen pit, Grimmen; Dobbertin clay pit	Shells	A saltwater scallop, member of Oxytomidae.	Meleagrinella
Nucula	N. caecilia	Dobbertin	Shells	A saltwater clam, member of Nuculidae.	Nucula
Parainoceramya	P. dubia; P. amygdaloides; P. sp.	Klein Lehmhagen pit, Grimmen; Dobbertin; Karziger Ufer; Müssentin; Broock; Hohenbarnekow; Grenzin; Groß Roge; Elmenhorst; Klütz Höved; Pinnow; Consrade	Shells	A saltwater/brackish clam, member of Inoceramidae.	Parainoceramya
Parallelodon	P. cypriniformis	Ahrensburg	Shells	A saltwater clam, member of Parallelodontidae.	
Stalagmina	S. koeneni	Klein Lehmhagen pit, Grimmen; Dobbertin	Shells	A saltwater clam, member of Inoceramidae.	
Steinmannia	S. bronni; S. radiata	Klein Lehmhagen pit, Grimmen; Dobbertin	Shells	A saltwater oyster, member of Posidoniidae.	Specimens on a matrix
Tancredia	T. elegans	Ahrensburg	Shells	A saltwater clam, member of Tancrediidae.	

=== Gastropoda ===
Genus	Species	Stratigraphic position	Material	Notes	Images
Cerithium	C. armatum; C. roeceri	Klein Lehmhagen pit, Grimmen	Shells	A sea snail, member of Cerithiinae.	Cerithium
Coelodiscus	C. minutus	Clay pit of Dobbertin; Klein Lehmhagen pit, Grimmen; Müssentin gravel pit; Ahrensburg	Shells	A holoplanktonic snail, type member of the family Coelodiscidae	
Turritella	T. sp.	Dobbertin	Shells	A sea snail, member of Turritellidae.	

=== Cephalopoda ===
Genus	Species	Stratigraphic position	Material	Notes	Images
Acrocoelites	A. pyramidalis	Klein Lehmhagen pit, Grimmen; Müssentin gravel pit	Multiple specimens.	A Belemnoidea member of the family Megateuthididae	Acrocoelites
Beloteuthis	B. schubleri	Klein Lehmhagen pit, Grimmen	Multiple specimens	A Mesoteuthoidea, member of the family Beloteuthidae.	Beloteuthis
Dactylioceras	D. athleticum; D. temperatum; D. attenuatum; D. tenuicostatum; D. semicelatum; D. cf. aequistriatum; D. eickenbergi; D. ernsti	Klein Lehmhagen pit, Grimmen; Dobbertin; Karziger Ufer; Müssentin; Broock; Hohenbarnekow; Grenzin; Groß Roge; Elmenhorst; Klütz Höved; Pinnow; Consrade; Ahrensburg	Shells	An ammonite, type member of the subfamily Dactylioceratinae.	Dactylioceras
Eleganticeras	E. elegantulum; E. sp.	Klein Lehmhagen pit, Grimmen; Dobbertin; Karziger Ufer; Müssentin; Broock; Hohenbarnekow; Grenzin; Groß Roge; Elmenhorst; Klütz Höved; Pinnow; Consrade; Ahrensburg	Shells	An ammonite, member of the family Hildoceratidae.	Eleganticeras
Hildaites	H. subserpentinus	Ahrensburg	Shells	An ammonite, member of the family Hildoceratidae.	
Jeletzkyteuthis	J. coriaceus	Klein Lehmhagen pit, Grimmen	Two specimens	A Loligosepiidae Loligosepiida (Vampyromorpha).	
Lobolytoceras	L. siemensi; L. sp.	Klein Lehmhagen pit, Grimmen; Dobbertin; Thüringen; Brandenburg; Braunschweig; Boulder from Ahrensburg	Shells	An ammonite, member of the family Lytoceratidae.	Lobolytoceras
Nodicoeloceras	N. crassoides	Ahrensburg	Shells	An ammonite, type member of the subfamily Dactylioceratinae.	
Peronoceras	P. fibulatum	Klein Lehmhagen pit, Grimmen; Dobbertin; Karziger Ufer; Müssentin; Broock; Hohenbarnekow; Grenzin; Groß Roge; Elmenhorst; Klütz Höved; Pinnow; Consrade; Ahrensburg	Shells	An ammonite, member of the subfamily Dactylioceratinae.	
Pseudolioceras	P. lythense	Klein Lehmhagen pit, Grimmen; Dobbertin; Karziger Ufer; Müssentin; Broock; Hohenbarnekow; Grenzin; Groß Roge; Elmenhorst; Klütz Höved; Pinnow; Consrade; Ahrensburg	Shells	An ammonite, member of the subfamily Harpoceratinae.	Pseudolioceras
Phylloceras	P. heterophyllum	Ahrensburg	Shells	An ammonite, type member of the subfamily Phylloceratinae.	Dactylioceras
Teudopsis	T. bollensis	Klein Lehmhagen pit, Grimmen	Few specimens	A vampire squid, member of Teudopsidae.	Teudopsis
Tiltoniceras	T. antiquum; T. costatum; T. acutum; T. schroederi; T. costatum; T. capillatum; T. sp.	Klein Lehmhagen pit, Grimmen; Dobbertin; Karziger Ufer; Müssentin; Broock; Hohenbarnekow; Grenzin; Groß Roge; Elmenhorst; Klütz Höved; Pinnow; Consrade; Ahrensburg	Shells	An ammonite, member of the family Hildoceratidae.	Tiltoniceras
Whitbyiceras	W. pingue	Ahrensburg	Shells	An ammonite, member of the family Phymatoceratidae.	

=== Crustacea ===
Small indeterminate shrimps, sometimes found associated in great numbers, are recovered on several layers at Grimmen.

Genus	Species	Stratigraphic position	Material	Notes	Images
Bairdia	B. hilda	Dobbertin	Valves	A marine/brackish ostracod of the family Bairdiidae.	
Bythocypris	B. elongata	Dobbertin	Valves	A marine/brackish ostracod of the family Bythocyprididae.	
Cytherelloidea	Indeterminate	Dobbertin	Valves	A marine/brackish ostracod of the superfamily Cytherelloidea.	
Euestheria	E. opalina; E. sp.	Klein Lehmhagen pit, Grimmen; Dobbertin	Valves	A freshwater clam shrimp (Phyllopodan) of the family Lioestheriidae. Originally identified as a bivalve of the genus Posidonia and latter a member of the genus Lioestheria.	
Glyphea	G. liasina	Dobbertin	Isolated molts; Isolated chelae	A marine decapod, type member of the family Glypheidae.	Glyphea
Hungarella	H. adenticulata; H. sp.	Dobbertin	Valves	A marine/brackish ostracod of the family Healdiidae	
Paracypris	P. semidisca	Dobbertin	Valves	A marine/brackish ostracod of the subfamily Paracypridinae.	
Polycope	P. cincinnata; P. sp.	Dobbertin	Valves	A marine/brackish ostracod of the family Polycopidae.	
Procytheridea	P. sp.	Dobbertin	Valves	A marine/brackish ostracod of the family Protocytheridae.	
Proeryon	P. hartmanni; cf.P. sp.	Klein Lehmhagen pit, Grimmen; Dobbertin	Isolated molts; Single specimen with preserved upper thorax and chelae	A marine decapod, member of the subfamily Proeryoninae.	Proeryon
Trachycythere	T. tubulosa	Dobbertin	Valves	A marine/brackish ostracod of incertae sedis affinity	

=== Arachnida ===
Genus	Species	Stratigraphic position	Material	Notes	Images
Seppo	S. koponeni	Klein Lehmhagen pit, Grimmen	Single incomplete specimen	A spider, possible member of the superfamily Palpimanoidea. It is the first confirmed spider from the lower Jurassic, and a rare find, probably washed to the sea due to a hard wind related to hurricane action. Probably a ground-dwelling predator that hunted the abundant insect fauna present on the layers.	

=== Insecta ===
Insects are common terrestrial animals that were probably drifted to the sea due to Moonsonal conditions present on the Ciechocinek Formation. In Klein Lehmhagen insects are found as part of calcareous nodules in the exaratum-elegantulum subzones, with specimens also found in living chambers of Eleganticeras elegantulum macrochonchs and in fish coprolites which are the most frequent fossils at all. In the elegantulum the insect fauna is dominated by beetle elytra, indicating strong fluvial input and a nearshore deltaic complex. On Dobbertin, insects are present in the exaratum nodules, where fluvial input is seen thanks to the phyllopod abundance and whole bedding planes covered by algae substituted by Ca-phosphat, being the layers where insects are most abundant.

==== Notoptera ====
Genus	Species	Stratigraphic position	Material	Notes	Images
Geinitzia	G. schlieffeni; G. debilis; G. minor	Dobbertin, Mecklenburg (Greifswald collection)	Specimens	A notopteran, member of the family Geinitziidae.	
Nele	N. jurassica	Klein Lehmhagen pit, Grimmen	Specimens	A notopteran, member of the family Bajanzhargalanidae.	Grylloblatta, extant ice crawler, Nele was probably similar
Prosepididontus	P. calopteryx	Dobbertin, Mecklenburg (Greifswald collection)	Specimens	A notopteran, member of Geinitziidae.	

==== Odonatoptera ====
Genus	Species	Stratigraphic position	Material	Notes	Images
Obotritagrion	O. tenuiformum; O. petersi	Klein Lehmhagen pit, Grimmen; Dobbertin, Mecklenburg (Zessin collection)	Specimens	An odonatopteran, member of the family Protomyrmeleontidae.	
Protomyrmeleon	P. brunonis; P. quadriordinum	Klein Lehmhagen pit, Grimmen; Dobbertin, Mecklenburg (Zessin collection); Dobbertin, Mecklenburg (Ansorge coll); Dobbertin, Mecklenburg (Greifswald collection)	Specimens	An odonatopteran, member of the family Protomyrmeleontidae.	

===== Odonata =====
Genus	Species	Stratigraphic position	Material	Notes	Images
Anisozygopteron	A. geinitzianum	Dobbertin, Mecklenburg (Greifswald collection)	Specimens	A dragonfly, member of the family Myopophlebiidae.	
Anomothemis	A. brevistigma	Dobbertin, Mecklenburg (Greifswald collection)	Specimens	incertae sedis	
Archithemis	A. brodiei	Dobbertin, Mecklenburg (Greifswald collection)	Specimens	incertae sedis	
Dialothemis	D. dubia	Dobbertin, Mecklenburg (Greifswald collection)	Specimens	A dragonfly, member of the family Selenothemistidae.	
Eosagrion	E. risi	Dobbertin, Mecklenburg (Greifswald collection)	Specimens	A dragonfly, member of the family Eosagrionidae.	
Grimmenopteron	G. elegantulum	Klein Lehmhagen pit, Grimmen	Specimens	A dragonfly, member of the family Liassophlebiidae.	
Heterophlebia	H. buckmani; H. megapolitana	Klein Lehmhagen pit, Grimmen; Dobbertin, Mecklenburg (Zessin collection)	Specimens	A dragonfly, member of the family Heterophlebiidae.	
Heterothemis	H. brodiei; H. germanica	Dobbertin, Mecklenburg (Greifswald collection); Ahrensburg erratics	Specimens	A dragonfly, member of the family Liassogomphidae.	
Liadothemis	L. hydrodictyon; L. major; L. geinitzi; L. insignis	Dobbertin, Mecklenburg (Zessin collection); Dobbertin, Mecklenburg (Greifswald collection)	Specimens	Incertae sedis. Magnasupplephlebia represents a very large dragonfly, with a wingspan of 13 cm. Other odonatan remains are unable to being referred to a concrete group due to their incomplete status.	
Magnasupplephlebia	M. kallweita; M. intercalaria	Dobbertin, Mecklenburg (Zessin collection); Dobbertin, Mecklenburg (Ansorge coll)	Specimens	Incertae sedis. Magnasupplephlebia represents a very large dragonfly, with a wingspan of 13 cm. Other odonatan remains are unable to being referred to a concrete group due to their incomplete status.	
Parelthothemis	P. dobbertinensis	Dobbertin, Mecklenburg (Greifswald collection)	Specimens	Incertae sedis. Magnasupplephlebia represents a very large dragonfly, with a wingspan of 13 cm. Other odonatan remains are unable to being referred to a concrete group due to their incomplete status.	
Petrothemis	P. singularis	Dobbertin, Mecklenburg (Greifswald collection)	Specimens	Incertae sedis. Magnasupplephlebia represents a very large dragonfly, with a wingspan of 13 cm. Other odonatan remains are unable to being referred to a concrete group due to their incomplete status.	
Pycnothemis	P. densa	Dobbertin, Mecklenburg (Greifswald collection)	Specimens	Incertae sedis. Magnasupplephlebia represents a very large dragonfly, with a wingspan of 13 cm. Other odonatan remains are unable to being referred to a concrete group due to their incomplete status.	
Rhabdothemis	R. strigivena	Dobbertin, Mecklenburg (Greifswald collection)	Specimens	Incertae sedis. Magnasupplephlebia represents a very large dragonfly, with a wingspan of 13 cm. Other odonatan remains are unable to being referred to a concrete group due to their incomplete status.	
Selenothemis	S. liadis	Dobbertin, Mecklenburg (NHMW collection)	Specimens	A dragonfly, type member of the family Selenothemistidae.	
Temnostigma	T. singulare	Dobbertin, Mecklenburg (Greifswald collection)	Specimens	Incertae sedis.	
Trigonophlebia	T. zessini	Klein Lehmhagen pit, Grimmen	Specimens	A dragonfly, member of the family Heterophlebiidae.	
Turanopteron	T. pommerana	Klein Lehmhagen pit, Grimmen	Specimens	A dragonfly, member of the family Asiopteridae. Sphenophlebia pommerana is a junior synonym.	

==== Paraneoptera ====
Genus	Species	Stratigraphic position	Material	Notes	Images
Archipsylla	A. primitiva	Klein Lehmhagen pit, Grimmen; Dobbertin, Mecklenburg (Greifswald collection)	Specimens	A paraneopteran, member of the family Archipsyllidae.	
Liassopsocus	L. lanceolatus	Klein Lehmhagen pit, Grimmen	Specimens	A paraneopteran, member of the family Psocidiidae.	

==== Eoblattida ====
Genus	Species	Stratigraphic position	Material	Notes	Images
Griphopteron	G. molle	Klein Lehmhagen pit, Grimmen; Dobbertin, Mecklenburg (Greifswald collection)	Specimens	An Eoblattidan, member of the family Blattogryllidae.	

==== Thysanoptera ====
Genus	Species	Stratigraphic position	Material	Notes	Images
Liadoptilia	L. misera	Klein Lehmhagen pit, Grimmen	Specimens	Thysanopterans, members of the family Lophioneurida. Aeroplankton is extraordinarily well preserved in Grimmen, with the most abundant representatives of the aeroplankton (around 3 mm) being Lophioneurids, specially Undacypha europaea.	Extant Thysanopteran, extinct genera were probably similar
Trichorthophlebia	T. pilifera	Dobbertin, Mecklenburg (Greifswald collection)	Specimens	Thysanopterans, members of the family Lophioneurida. Aeroplankton is extraordinarily well preserved in Grimmen, with the most abundant representatives of the aeroplankton (around 3 mm) being Lophioneurids, specially Undacypha europaea.	Extant Thysanopteran, extinct genera were probably similar
Undacypha	U. europaea	Dobbertin, Mecklenburg (Greifswald collection)	Specimens	Thysanopterans, members of the family Lophioneurida. Aeroplankton is extraordinarily well preserved in Grimmen, with the most abundant representatives of the aeroplankton (around 3 mm) being Lophioneurids, specially Undacypha europaea.	Extant Thysanopteran, extinct genera were probably similar

==== Plecoptera ====
Genus	Species	Stratigraphic position	Material	Notes	Images
Dicronemoura	D. furcata	Klein Lehmhagen pit, Grimmen	Specimens	A stonefly, member of the family Perlariopseidae.	
Dobbertiniopteryx	D. capniomimus	Dobbertin, Mecklenburg (Ansorge coll)	Specimens	A winter stonefly, member of the family Capniidae.	extant Capniidae, Dobbertiniopteryx was probably similar

==== Orthoptera ====
Genus	Species	Stratigraphic position	Material	Notes	Images
Locustopsis	L. gyra; L. bernstorffi; L. sippeli; L. dubia; L. bernstorffi; L. nana; L. reducta; L. elongata; L. elegans; L. pulchella; L. procera; L. mecklenburgica; L. maculosa; L. sp 1; L. sp 2; L. sp 3; L. sp 4	Grimmen (Krempien collection); Lehmhagen, near Grimmen (Zessin collection); Klein Lehmhagen pit, Grimmen; Dobbertin, Mecklenburg (Zessin collection); Dobbertin, Mecklenburg (Ansorge coll); Dobbertin, Mecklenburg (Greifswald collection)	Specimens	Grasshoppers of the family Locustopsidae.	
Locustophanes	L. rhipidophorus	Dobbertin, Mecklenburg (Greifswald collection)	Specimens	A locust, type member of the family Locustidae.	Acanthacris, extant Locust, Locustophanes was probably similar
Panorpidium	P. geinitzi; P. magna; P. minima; P. media; P. reticulata; P. mesostena	Grimmen (Krempien collection); Lehmhagen, near Grimmen (Zessin collection); Klein Lehmhagen pit, Grimmen; Dobbertin (Breslau Museum Coll.); Dobbertin, Mecklenburg (Zessin collection); Dobbertin (Naturkundemuseum Coll.); Dobbertin, Mecklenburg (Ansorge coll); Dobbertin, Mecklenburg (Greifswald collection)	Specimens	A grasshopper, member of the family Elcanidae.	
Parelcana	P. tenuis	Klein Lehmhagen pit, Grimmen; Dobbertin (Naturkundemuseum Coll.); Dobbertin, Mecklenburg (Greifswald collection)	Specimens	A grasshopper, member of the family Elcanidae.	
Plesioschwinzia	P. thalassophila; P. lacera	Dobbertin, Mecklenburg (Ansorge coll); Dobbertin, Mecklenburg (Greifswald collection)	Specimens	Grasshoppers of the family Locustopsidae.	
Protochaeta	P. masculina; P. lanceolata	Klein Lehmhagen pit, Grimmen; Dobbertin, Mecklenburg (Greifswald collection)	Specimens	A grasshopper, member of the family Regiatidae.	
Protogryllus	P. dobbertinensis; P. germanicus; P. sp.; P. vicinus; P. liadis; P. major; P. stenobasis; P. femina; P. acutipennis; P. minor; P. irregularis	Klein Lehmhagen pit, Grimmen; Dobbertin, Mecklenburg (BMNH collection); Dobbertin (Naturkundemuseum Coll.); Dobbertin, Mecklenburg (Greifswald collection); Ahrensburg Erratics	Specimens	A cricket-like grasshopper, type member of the family Protogryllidae.	
Schwinzia	S. sola	Dobbertin, Mecklenburg (Zessin collection)	Specimens	Grasshoppers of the family Locustopsidae.	
Synelcana	S. muelleri	Dobbertin, Mecklenburg (Zessin collection)	Specimens	A grasshopper, member of the family Elcanidae.	
Zalmonites	Z. geinitzi	Dobbertin, Mecklenburg (Greifswald collection)	Specimens	A grasshopper, incertae sedis.	

==== Phasmatodea ====
Genus	Species	Stratigraphic position	Material	Notes	Images
Durnovaria	D. cf. parallela	Klein Lehmhagen pit, Grimmen	Specimens	A stick insect, member of the family Aerophasmidae.	Example of extant Phasmatodean, Durnovaria was probably similar

==== Blattodea ====
Genus	Species	Stratigraphic position	Material	Notes	Images
Blattula	B. langfeldti; B. dubia	Klein Lehmhagen pit, Grimmen; Dobbertin, Mecklenburg (NHMW collection); Dobbertin, Mecklenburg (Ansorge coll); Dobbertin, Mecklenburg (Greifswald collection); Ahrensburg Erratics	Specimens	A cockroach, member of the family Blattulidae.	
Caloblattina	C. mathildae	Dobbertin, Mecklenburg (Ansorge coll); Dobbertin, Mecklenburg (Greifswald collection)	Specimens	A cockroach, type member of the family Caloblattinidae.	
Dipluroblattina	D. scudderi	Dobbertin, Mecklenburg (Greifswald collection)	Specimens	A cockroach, member of the family Blattulidae.	
Eublattula	E. crassivena	Dobbertin, Mecklenburg (Greifswald collection)	Specimens	A cockroach, member of the family Blattulidae.	
Liadoblattina	L. blakei	Dobbertin, Mecklenburg (Ansorge coll); Dobbertin, Mecklenburg (Greifswald collection)	Specimens	A carnivorous cockroach, type member of the family Raphidiomimidae.	
Mesoblattina	M. protypa	Klein Lehmhagen pit, Grimmen; Dobbertin, Mecklenburg (Ansorge coll); Dobbertin, Mecklenburg (Greifswald collection)	Specimens	A cockroach, type member of the family Mesoblattinidae.	

==== Hemiptera ====
Genus	Species	Stratigraphic position	Material	Notes	Images
Acromocoris	A. similis	Dobbertin, Mecklenburg (NHMW collection); Dobbertin, Mecklenburg (Greifswald collection)	Specimens	A water boatman, member of the family Corixidae.	Example of extant Corixidae, Acromocoris was probably similar
Anosmus	A. spilopterus	Dobbertin, Mecklenburg (Greifswald collection)	Specimens	Shore bugs, member of the family Archegocimicidae.	
Aphlebocoris	A. punctata; A. nana	Dobbertin, Mecklenburg (Greifswald collection)	Specimens	A creeping water bug, member of the family Naucoridae.	Example of extant Naucoridae, extinct genera where probably similar
Apopnus	A. magniclavus	Dobbertin, Mecklenburg (Greifswald collection)	Specimens	A creeping water bug, member of the family Naucoridae.	Example of extant Naucoridae, extinct genera where probably similar
Apsicoria	Apsicoria semideleta	Dobbertin, Mecklenburg (Greifswald collection)	Specimens	True bugs, member of the family Pachymeridiidae.	
Ardela	A. grimmenensis	Klein Lehmhagen pit, Grimmen	Specimens	Leafhoppers of the family Archijassidae.	
Archegocimex	A. geinitzi; A. primitiva; A. liadis	Dobbertin, Mecklenburg (Greifswald collection)	Specimens	Shore bugs, member of the family Archegocimicidae.	Example of extant Pentacora, Archegocimicidae genera where probably similar
Archicercopis	A. falcatus	Dobbertin, Mecklenburg (Greifswald collection)	Specimens	Moss bugs of the family Progonocimicidae.	
Archijassus	Archijassus heeri	Klein Lehmhagen pit, Grimmen; Dobbertin, Mecklenburg (Greifswald collection)	Specimens	Leafhoppers of the family Archijassidae.	Example of extant Membracidae, Archijassidae genera where probably similar
Aphidulum	A. ciliatum	Klein Lehmhagen pit, Grimmen	Specimens	A Sternorrhynchan, member of the family Protopsyllidiidae.	
Archiconiopteryx	A. liasina	Klein Lehmhagen pit, Grimmen; Dobbertin, Mecklenburg (Greifswald collection)	Specimens	A Stemorrhynchan, type member of the family Archiconiopterygidae.	
Cathalus	Cathalus alutaceus	Dobbertin, Mecklenburg (Greifswald collection)	Specimens	True bugs, member of the family Pachymeridiidae.	
Cixiites	C. liasinus	Dobbertin, Mecklenburg (Greifswald collection)	Specimens	Planthoppers of the family Fulgoridiidae.	
Cuneocoris	C. geinitzi	Dobbertin, Mecklenburg (Greifswald collection)	Specimens	A true bug, member of the family Cuneocoridae.	
Diatillus	Diatillus debilis	Dobbertin, Mecklenburg (Greifswald collection)	Specimens	Shore bugs, member of the family Archegocimicidae.	
Eocercopis	E. ancyloptera; E. similis	Dobbertin, Mecklenburg (NHMW collection); Dobbertin, Mecklenburg (Greifswald collection)	Specimens	Moss bugs of the family Progonocimicidae.	
Fulgoridium	F. egens; F. lapideum; F. dubium; F. latum; F. venosum; F. pallidum; F. geinitzi; F. spilographum; F. oligoneurum; F. regulare; F. graphipterum; F. inconspicuum; F. quadrisignatum; F. breviradiatum; F. modestum; F. anale; F. marginepunctatum; F. picturatum; F. anomalum; F. stigmaticum; F. punctatum; F. mortuum; F. alatum; F. nodosum; F. megapolitanum; F. pulchrum; F. remotum; F. multivenosum; F. debile; F. trifurcatum; F. litorale; F. parvispilum; F. retractum; F. polyneurum; F. oligospilum; F. nubeculum; F. obtusum; F. grave; F. fenestratum; F. breve; F. dilutum; F. multipunctatum; F. ampliatum; F. clavatum; F. nebulosum; F. vicinum; F. curvipenne; F. elegantulum; F. defunctum; F. plicatum; F. exhumatum; F. angulosum; F. acutum; F. rotundatum; F. ancylla; F. bifurcatum; F. inaequale; F. brachyptilum; F. intercalatum; F. balticum	Grimmen (EMAU collection); Klein Lehmhagen pit, Grimmen; Dobbertin (Breslau Museum Coll.); Dobbertin, Mecklenburg (NHMW collection); Dobbertin, Mecklenburg (Greifswald collection)	Specimens	Planthoppers of the family Fulgoridiidae.	Example of extant Fulgoridae, Fulgoridiidae genera where probably similar
Grimmenaphis	G. magnifica	Klein Lehmhagen pit, Grimmen	Specimens	An aphid, member of the family Oviparosiphidae.	Example of extant Aphidoidea, Oviparosiphidae genera where probably similar
Hadrocoris	H. scutellaris	Dobbertin, Mecklenburg (Greifswald collection)	Specimens	A true bug, member of the family Hadrocoridae.	
Hypocimex	Hypocimex membranaceus	Dobbertin, Mecklenburg (Greifswald collection)	Specimens	True bugs, member of the family Pachymeridiidae.	
Liadopsylla	L. geinitzi; L. obtusa	Klein Lehmhagen pit, Grimmen; Dobbertin, Mecklenburg (Greifswald collection)	Specimens	A jumping plant louse, member of the family Liadopsyllidae.	
Liassocercopis	L. schnicki	Klein Lehmhagen pit, Grimmen	Specimens	A cicadomorphan, member of the family Hylicellidae.	
Liasocoris	L. hainmuelleri	Schwinzer brickyard, near Goldberg	Specimens	A true bug, incertae sedis inside Hemiptera.	
Margaroptilon	M. germanicum	Dobbertin, Mecklenburg (Greifswald collection)	Specimens	Planthoppers of the family Fulgoridiidae.	
Mesoledra	M. pachyneura	Klein Lehmhagen pit, Grimmen; Dobbertin (Naturkundemuseum Coll.); Dobbertin, Mecklenburg (Greifswald collection)	Specimens	Leafhoppers of the family Archijassidae.	
Metafulgoridium	M. spilotum; M. ampliatum; M. graptum	Dobbertin, Mecklenburg (Greifswald collection)	Specimens	Planthoppers of the family Fulgoridiidae.	
Pachymeridium	P. dubium	Dobbertin, Mecklenburg (Greifswald collection)	Specimens	True bugs, member of the family Pachymeridiidae.	
Probascanion	P. megacephalum	Dobbertin, Mecklenburg (NHMW collection)	Specimens	A Coleorrhynchan, member of the family Probascanionidae.	
Procercopis	P. alutacea; P. coriacea; P. liasina; P. similis; P. jurassica	Dobbertin, Mecklenburg (Greifswald collection)	Specimens	Froghoppers of the family Procercopidae.	
Procercopina	P. frenzeli	Klein Lehmhagen pit, Grimmen	Specimens	Froghoppers of the family Procercopidae.	
Progonocimex	P. jurassicus; P. liasinus	Dobbertin, Mecklenburg (Greifswald collection)	Specimens	Moss bugs of the family Progonocimicidae.	Example of extant Peloridiidae, Progonocimicidae genera where probably similar
Progonocoris	P. pictus	Dobbertin, Mecklenburg (Greifswald collection)	Specimens	Shore bugs, member of the family Archegocimicidae.	
Sisyrocoris	S. rudis	Dobbertin, Mecklenburg (Greifswald collection)	Specimens	True bugs, member of the family Pachymeridiidae.	
Toarcopsyllidium	T. ernsti	Klein Lehmhagen pit, Grimmen	Isolated Wings	A Sternorrhynchan, member of the family Protopsyllidiidae.	

==== Hymenoptera ====
Genus	Species	Stratigraphic position	Material	Notes	Images
Brigittepterus	B. brauckmanni	Dobbertin, Mecklenburg (Zessin collection)	Isolated Wings	Wasps, member of the family Ephialtitidae.	
Grimmaratavites	G. mirabilis	Klein Lehmhagen pit, Grimmen	Specimens	A Wood Wasp, member of the family Karatavitidae.	
Liadobracona	L. raduhna	Dobbertin, Mecklenburg (Zessin collection); Dobbertin, Mecklenburg (Ansorge coll)	Isolated Wings	Wasps, member of the family Ephialtitidae.	
Xyelula	X. benderi	Klein Lehmhagen pit, Grimmen; Dobbertin, Mecklenburg (Zessin collection); Dobbertin, Mecklenburg (Ansorge coll)	Specimens	A pseudo-Wasp, member of the family Sepulcidae.	

==== Megaloptera ====
Genus	Species	Stratigraphic position	Material	Notes	Images
Dobbertinia	D. reticulata	Dobbertin, Mecklenburg (Greifswald collection)	Specimens	An alderfly, member of the family Sialidae.	Example of extant Sialidae, Dobbertinia was probably similar

==== Neuroptera ====
Genus	Species	Stratigraphic position	Material	Notes	Images
Actinophlebia	A. megapolitana; A. aenea; A. parallela	Klein Lehmhagen pit, Grimmen; Dobbertin, Mecklenburg (Greifswald collection)	Specimens	Lacewings of the family Prohemerobiidae	
Apeirophlebia	A. grandis	Dobbertin, Mecklenburg (Greifswald collection)	Specimens	A silky lacewing, member of the family Psychopsidae.	Example of extant Psychopsidae, Apeirophlebia was probably similar
Epigambria	E. longipennis	Dobbertin, Mecklenburg (Greifswald collection)	Specimens	A lacewing, member of the family Epigambriidae.	Example of extant Ithonidae, Epigambriidae members where probably similar
Liassochrysa	L. stigmatica	Dobbertin, Mecklenburg (Ansorge coll)	Specimens	A Neuropteran of the family Mantispidae.	Example of extant Mantispidae, Liassochrysa was probably similar
Loxophleps	L. costalis	Dobbertin, Mecklenburg (Greifswald collection)	Specimens	A lacewing, incertae sedis inside Neuroptera.	
Melaneimon	M. dubium	Dobbertin, Mecklenburg (Greifswald collection)	Specimens	A lacewing, incertae sedis inside Neuroptera.	
Melamnous	M. indistinctus	Dobbertin, Mecklenburg (Greifswald collection)	Specimens	A lacewing, incertae sedis inside Neuroptera.	
Mesoleon	M. dobbertinianus	Dobbertin, Mecklenburg (Greifswald collection)	Specimens	A lacewing, incertae sedis inside Neuroptera.	
Mesosmylina	M. falcifera	Klein Lehmhagen pit, Grimmen	Specimens	A lance lacewing, member of the family Osmylidae.	
Polyosmylus	P. excelsus	Klein Lehmhagen pit, Grimmen	Specimens	A lacewing, member of the family Epigambriidae.	
Prohemerobius	P. prodromus; P. ovatus; P. anomalus; P. costalis; P. persimilis; P. geinitzi; P. liasinus; P. major; P. parvulus; P. geinitzianus; P. dilaroides; P. chryseus; P. latus	Klein Lehmhagen pit, Grimmen; Dobbertin, Mecklenburg (Greifswald collection)	Specimens	Lacewings of the family Prohemerobiidae.	
Solenoptilon	S. kochi	Dobbertin, Mecklenburg (Greifswald collection)	Specimens	A lacewing, type member of the family Solenoptilidae.	
Toarciconiopteryx	T. dipterosimilis	Klein Lehmhagen pit, Grimmen	Specimens	A dustywing, member of the subfamily Toarciconiopteryginae.	Example of extant Coniopterygidae, Toarciconiopteryx was probably similar

==== Coleoptera ====
Genus	Species	Stratigraphic position	Material	Notes	Images
Allognosis	A. nitens	Dobbertin, Mecklenburg (Greifswald collection)	Specimens	Beetles, incertae sedis inside Coleoptera.	
Anancaeon	A. microcephalum	Dobbertin, Mecklenburg (NHMW collection)	Specimens	Beetles, incertae sedis inside Coleoptera.	
Anomerus	A. punctifer	Dobbertin, Mecklenburg (Greifswald collection)	Specimens	Beetles, incertae sedis inside Coleoptera.	
Anypostatus	A. taurus	Dobbertin, Mecklenburg (Greifswald collection)	Specimens	Beetles, incertae sedis inside Coleoptera.	
Apioderes	A. punctatus	Dobbertin, Mecklenburg (Greifswald collection)	Specimens	Beetles, incertae sedis inside Coleoptera.	
Apsychus	A. alutaceus	Dobbertin, Mecklenburg (Greifswald collection)	Specimens	Beetles, incertae sedis inside Coleoptera.	
Bareus	B. strigipennis	Dobbertin, Mecklenburg (Greifswald collection)	Specimens	Beetles, incertae sedis inside Coleoptera.	
Bathygerus	B. bellus; B. divergens	Dobbertin, Mecklenburg (Greifswald collection)	Specimens	Beetles, incertae sedis inside Coleoptera.	
Carabites	C. dubius; C. geinitzi	Dobbertin, Mecklenburg (Greifswald collection)	Specimens	A ground beetle, member of the family Carabidae.	Example of extant Carabidae, Carabites was probably similar
Clinomerus	C. laticollis	Dobbertin, Mecklenburg (Greifswald collection)	Specimens	Beetles, incertae sedis inside Coleoptera.	
Coptogyrinus	C. scutellatus	Dobbertin, Mecklenburg (Greifswald collection)	Specimens	A whirligig beetle, member of the family Gyrinidae.	Example of extant Gyrinidae, Coptogyrinus was probably similar
Ecthlimma	E. forficuloides	Dobbertin, Mecklenburg (Greifswald collection)	Specimens	Beetles, incertae sedis inside Coleoptera.	
Enamma	E. striatum	Dobbertin, Mecklenburg (Greifswald collection)	Specimens	Beetles, incertae sedis inside Coleoptera.	
Eurynucha	E. pseudobuprestis	Dobbertin, Mecklenburg (Greifswald collection)	Specimens	A jewel beetle, member of the family Buprestidae.	Example of extant Buprestidae, Eurynucha was probably similar
Gyrinulopsis	G. nanu	Dobbertin, Mecklenburg (Greifswald collection)	Specimens	Beetles, incertae sedis inside Coleoptera.	
Hydrobiites	H. dobbertinensis; H. punctatostriatus	Dobbertin, Mecklenburg (NHMW collection)	Specimens	A beetle, member of the family Permosynidae.	
Keleusticus	K. zirkeli	Dobbertin, Mecklenburg (Greifswald collection)	Specimens	Beetles, incertae sedis inside Coleoptera.	
Liassodites	L. obsti	Klein Lehmhagen pit, Grimmen	Specimens	A False Ground Beetle of the family Trachypachidae.	Extant member of Trachypachidae, Liassodites was probably similar
Masselytron	M. quinquestriatum	Dobbertin, Mecklenburg (Greifswald collection)	Specimens	Beetles, incertae sedis inside Coleoptera.	
Nannoodes	N. pseudocistela	Dobbertin, Mecklenburg (Greifswald collection)	Specimens	Beetles, incertae sedis inside Coleoptera.	
Nebrioides	N. dobbertinensis	Dobbertin, Mecklenburg (Greifswald collection)	Specimens	Beetles, incertae sedis inside Coleoptera.	
Onkedodimus	O. discicollis	Dobbertin, Mecklenburg (Greifswald collection)	Specimens	Beetles, incertae sedis inside Coleoptera.	
Oxytoroptera	O. mediocris	Dobbertin, Mecklenburg (Greifswald collection)	Specimens	Beetles, incertae sedis inside Coleoptera.	
Paracurculium	P. punctatum	Dobbertin, Mecklenburg (Greifswald collection)	Specimens	Beetles, incertae sedis inside Coleoptera.	
Parnidium	P. frechi; P. geinitzi	Dobbertin, Mecklenburg (Greifswald collection)	Specimens	Beetles, incertae sedis inside Coleoptera.	
Periboloptera	P. rotunda	Dobbertin, Mecklenburg (Greifswald collection)	Specimens	Beetles, incertae sedis inside Coleoptera.	
Plastobuprestites	P. elegans	Dobbertin, Mecklenburg (Greifswald collection)	Specimens	Beetles, incertae sedis inside Coleoptera.	
Plastonebria	P. scudderi	Dobbertin, Mecklenburg (Greifswald collection)	Specimens	Beetles, incertae sedis inside Coleoptera.	
Polypamon	P. byrrhoides	Dobbertin, Mecklenburg (Greifswald collection)	Specimens	Beetles, incertae sedis inside Coleoptera.	
Pseudocyphon	P. geinitzi	Dobbertin, Mecklenburg (Greifswald collection)	Specimens	Beetles, incertae sedis inside Coleoptera.	
Pseudoprionites	P. liasinus	Dobbertin, Mecklenburg (Greifswald collection)	Specimens	Beetles, incertae sedis inside Coleoptera.	
Thoracotes	T. dubius	Dobbertin, Mecklenburg (Greifswald collection)	Specimens	A bark gnawing beetle, member of the family Trogossitidae.	Example of extant Trogossitidae, Thoracotes was probably similar

==== Trichoptera ====
Genus	Species	Stratigraphic position	Material	Notes	Images
Archiptilia	A. ovata	Dobbertin, Mecklenburg (Greifswald collection)	Specimens	Caddisflies, member of the family Necrotauliidae.	
Epididontus	E. geinitzianus	Dobbertin, Mecklenburg (Greifswald collection)	Specimens	Caddisflies, member of the family Necrotauliidae.	
Liadotaulius	L. maior	Klein Lehmhagen pit, Grimmen; Dobbertin, Mecklenburg (Ansorge coll); Dobbertin, Mecklenburg (Greifswald collection)	Specimens	A finger-net caddisfly, member of the family Philopotamidae.	Example of extant Philopotamidae, Liadotaulius was probably similar
Mesotrichopteridium	M. intermedium; M. pusillum	Klein Lehmhagen pit, Grimmen; Dobbertin, Mecklenburg (Ansorge coll); Dobbertin, Mecklenburg (Greifswald collection)	Specimens	Caddisflies, member of the family Necrotauliidae.	
Metarchitaulius	M. longus	Dobbertin, Mecklenburg (Greifswald collection)	Specimens	Caddisflies, member of the family Necrotauliidae.	
Nannotrichopteron	N. gracile	Dobbertin, Mecklenburg (Greifswald collection)	Specimens	Caddisflies, member of the family Necrotauliidae.	
Necrotaulius	N. parvulus	Klein Lehmhagen pit, Grimmen; Dobbertin, Mecklenburg (Ansorge coll); Dobbertin, Mecklenburg (Greifswald collection)	Specimens	Caddisflies, member of the family Necrotauliidae.	
Palaeotaulius	P. vicinus	Dobbertin, Mecklenburg (Greifswald collection)	Specimens	Caddisflies, member of the family Necrotauliidae.	
Parataulius	P. jurassicus	Dobbertin, Mecklenburg (Greifswald collection)	Specimens	Caddisflies, member of the family Necrotauliidae.	
Paratrichopteridium	P. efossum; P. costale	Dobbertin, Mecklenburg (Greifswald collection)	Specimens	Caddisflies, member of the family Necrotauliidae.	
Pararchitaulius	P. ovalis	Dobbertin, Mecklenburg (Greifswald collection)	Specimens	Caddisflies, member of the family Necrotauliidae.	
Pseudorthophlebia	P. platyptera	Dobbertin, Mecklenburg (Greifswald collection)	Specimens	Caddisflies, member of the family Necrotauliidae.	

==== Lepidoptera ====
Genus	Species	Stratigraphic position	Material	Notes	Images
Eolepidopterigidae	Eolepidopterigidae indet. A; Eolepidopterigidae indet. B; Eolepidopterigidae indet. C	Klein Lehmhagen pit, Grimmen	Isolated wings; Isolated wing scales	A moth, member of the family Eolepidopterigidae.	

==== Mecoptera ====
Genus	Species	Stratigraphic position	Material	Notes	Images
Mesobittacus	M. minutus	Klein Lehmhagen pit, Grimmen; Dobbertin, Mecklenburg (Greifswald collection)	Specimens	Hangingflies, member of the family Bittacidae.	
Mesochorista	M. sinuata	Dobbertin, Mecklenburg (Greifswald collection)	Specimens	A Scorpionfly, member of the family Permochoristidae.	
Mesopanorpa	M. maculata	Dobbertin, Mecklenburg (Greifswald collection)	Specimens	Hangingflies, member of the family Orthophlebiidae.	
Neorthophlebia	N. maculipennis; N. megapolitana; N. pallida; N. debilis; N. simillima; N. medialis; N. stigmatica; N. acutipennis	Klein Lehmhagen pit, Grimmen; Dobbertin, Mecklenburg (Greifswald collection)	Specimens	Hangingflies, member of the family Bittacidae.	Example of extant Bittacidae, extinct members where probably similar
Orthophlebia	O. germanica; O. elongata; O. fuscipennis; O. limnophila; O. cf. limnophila; O. radialis; O. liadis; O. maculata; O. vicina; O. brunsvicensis	Klein Lehmhagen pit, Grimmen; Dobbertin (Breslau Museum Coll.); Dobbertin, Mecklenburg (Greifswald collection)	Specimens	Hangingflies, member of the family Orthophlebiidae.	
Parabittacus	P. analis; P. lingula	Dobbertin, Mecklenburg (Greifswald collection)	Specimens	Hangingflies, member of the family Bittacidae.	
Pseudopolycentropus	P. triangularis; P. perlaeformis; P. sp.	Klein Lehmhagen pit, Grimmen; Dobbertin, Mecklenburg (Greifswald collection)	Specimens	A scorpionfly, type member of the family Pseudopolycentropodidae.	

==== Diptera ====
Genus	Species	Stratigraphic position	Material	Notes	Images
Aenne	A. liasina	Schönenwald railway cutting, Grimmen; Klein Lehmhagen pit, Grimmen	Specimens	The oldest known non biting midgess, members of the Chironomidae	Example of extant Chironomidae, extinct members where probably similar
Antefungivora	A. germanica	Klein Lehmhagen pit, Grimmen	Specimens	Flies, member of the family Antefungivoridae.	
Archibio	A. mycetophilinus	Klein Lehmhagen pit, Grimmen; Dobbertin, Mecklenburg (Greifswald collection)	Specimens	Flies, member of the family Antefungivoridae.	
Archipleciomima	A. germanica; A. sp.	Klein Lehmhagen pit, Grimmen	Specimens	A fly, incertae sedis inside Diptera	
Archirhyphus	A. geinitzi	Klein Lehmhagen pit, Grimmen; Dobbertin, Mecklenburg (Greifswald collection)	Specimens	Flies, member of the family Protorhyphidae.	
Architipula	A. stigmatica; A. latipennis; A. elegans; A. seebachi; A. nana; A. pusilla; A. pulla; A. debilis; A. simplex; A. intermedia; A. obliqua; A. areolata; A. maior; A. conspicua; A. clara; A. dubia	Dobbertin, Mecklenburg (Greifswald collection)	Specimens	A crane fly of the family Limoniidae.	Example of extant Limoniidae, extinct members where probably similar
Crenoptychoptera	C. dobbertinensis	Dobbertin, Mecklenburg (Ansorge coll)	Specimens	A Phantom crane fly, member of the family Ptychopteridae.	Example of extant Ptychopteridae, extinct members where probably similar
Eoditomyia	E. primitiva	Klein Lehmhagen pit, Grimmen	Specimens	A fly, type member of the family Eoditomyidae.	
Eolimnobia	E. geinitzi	Dobbertin, Mecklenburg (Greifswald collection)	Specimens	A phantom crane fly, member of the family Ptychopteridae.	
Eoptychoptera	E. simplex; E. eximia	Dobbertin, Mecklenburg (Zessin collection); Dobbertin, Mecklenburg (Greifswald collection)	Specimens	A phantom crane fly, member of the family Ptychopteridae.	
Eotipula	E. defuncta; E. mortua; E. coarctata	Dobbertin, Mecklenburg (Greifswald collection)	Specimens	A crane fly of the family Limoniidae.	
Grimmenia	G. prima; G. secunda	Lehmhagen, near Grimmen (Zessin collection)	Specimens	A crane fly of the family Limoniidae.	
Grimmyia	G. baltica	Klein Lehmhagen pit, Grimmen	Specimens	A snipe fly, member of the family Rhagionidae.	Example of extant Rhagionidae, extinct members where probably similar
Heterorhyphus	H. triangularis	Klein Lehmhagen pit, Grimmen; Dobbertin, Mecklenburg (Greifswald collection)	Specimens	A fly, type member of the family Heterorhyphidae.	
Lehmhagenia	L. ansorgei	Klein Lehmhagen pit, Grimmen	Specimens	A fly, member of the family Protobrachyceridae.	
Liassobrachyceron	L. kotejai	Dobbertin, Mecklenburg (Ansorge coll)	Specimens	A snipe fly, member of the family Rhagionidae.	
Liassopsychodina	L. pommerana	Klein Lehmhagen pit, Grimmen	Specimens	A Moth fly, member of the family Psychodidae.	Example of extant Psychodidae, extinct members where probably similar
Mailotrichocera	M. mikereichi; M. variabilis; M. zessini	Klein Lehmhagen pit, Grimmen; Dobbertin, Mecklenburg (Ansorge coll)	Specimens	A Winter Crane Fly, member of the family Trichoceridae.	Example of extant Trichoceridae, extinct members where probably similar
Mesorhyphus	M. nanus	Dobbertin, Mecklenburg (Greifswald collection)	Specimens	A wood gnat, member of the family Anisopodidae.	Example of extant Anisopodidae, extinct members where probably similar
Mesotipula	M. siggiae; M. vicina; M. cf. vicina; M. mirabilis; M. curvata; M. geinitzi; M. minuta; M. lapidaria; M. parva	Lehmhagen, near Grimmen (Zessin collection); Dobbertin, Mecklenburg (NHMW collection); Dobbertin, Mecklenburg (Greifswald collection)	Specimens	A Crane Fly of the family Limoniidae.	
Metatrichopteridium	M. confusum	Dobbertin, Mecklenburg (Greifswald collection)	Specimens	A fly, member of the family Hennigmatidae.	
Nannotanyderus	N. grimmenensis; N. krzeminskii	Klein Lehmhagen pit, Grimmen; Dobbertin, Mecklenburg (Zessin collection); Dobbertin, Mecklenburg (Ansorge coll)	Specimens	A primitive Crane Fly, member of the family Tanyderidae.	
Oryctochlus	O. toarciensis	Klein Lehmhagen pit, Grimmen	Specimens	The oldest known non biting midges, members of the Chironomidae.	
Rhaetomyia	R. herrigi	Dobbertin, Mecklenburg (Greifswald collection)	Specimens	A Phantom midge of the family Chaoboridae.	Example of extant Chaoboridae, extinct members where probably similar
Palaeobrachyceron	P. willmanni	Klein Lehmhagen pit, Grimmen	Specimens	A Snipe fly, member of the family Rhagionidae.	
Phryganidium	P. minimum	Dobbertin, Mecklenburg (Greifswald collection)	Specimens	A Crane Fly of the family Limoniidae.	
Pleciofungivora	P. liassica	Klein Lehmhagen pit, Grimmen	Specimens	A fly, member of the family Pleciofungivoridae.	
Podonomius	P. tumidus	Klein Lehmhagen pit, Grimmen	Specimens	The oldest known non biting midges, members of the Chironomidae.	
Praemacrochile	P. decipiens; P. dobbertinensis	Dobbertin, Mecklenburg (Zessin collection); Dobbertin, Mecklenburg (Ansorge coll)	Specimens	A primitive Crane Fly, member of the family Tanyderidae.	
Protobrachyceron	P. liasinum	Dobbertin, Mecklenburg (Ansorge coll); Dobbertin, Mecklenburg (Greifswald collection)	Specimens	A fly, member of the family Protobrachyceridae.	
Protoplecia	P. klafacki; P. liasina	Klein Lehmhagen pit, Grimmen; Dobbertin, Mecklenburg (Greifswald collection)	Specimens	A fly, type member of the family Protopleciidae.	
Protorhyphus	P. simplex	Klein Lehmhagen pit, Grimmen; Dobbertin, Mecklenburg (Greifswald collection)	Specimens	Flies, member of the family Protorhyphidae.	
Tanypsycha	T. connexa	Klein Lehmhagen pit, Grimmen	Specimens	A Moth fly, member of the family Psychodidae.	

=== Echinodermata ===
In Dobbertin, the echinoderm remains are rare in contrast to foraminifera, phyllopods and ostracods, yet in some places they attain a percentage of the total fauna between 0.7 and 26.5%. In the upper layers they're totally absent, as well on the erratics and in the whole Grimmen sequence.

Genus	Species	Stratigraphic position	Material	Notes	Images
Crinoidea	Indeterminate	Dobbertin	Columnar ossicles	Incertae sedis	
Holothuriida	Indeterminate	Dobbertin	Holothurian wheels	Incertae sedis	
Sinosura	S. brodiei; S. spp.	Dobbertin	Isolated and semiarticulated specimens	A brittle star, member of Ophioleucidae inside Ophioleucida. Identified as Ophiura longivertebralis.	

=== Vertebrates ===
==== Fishes ====
Genus	Species	Stratigraphic position	Material	Notes	Images
Dapedium	D. pholidotum	Dobbertin	Incomplete skull	Member of the Dapediidae.	Dapedium
Grimmenichthys	G. ansorgei; Cf. G. ansorgei	Klein Lehmhagen pit, Grimmen	Articulated, but incompletely preserved specimens	Member of the group Pholidophoriformes. This genus was a small 'pholidophoriform' teleost.	
Grimmenodon	G. aureum	Klein Lehmhagen pit, Grimmen	Almost complete left prearticular with dentition	Member of the order Pycnodontiformes. Is of comparatively small size, suggesting a hypothetical small standard length of the fish of about 7–10 cm at the time of death.	
Gyrosteus	G. mirabilis	Ahrensburg Erratic Assemblage	GPIH 4864, Hyomandibula	Member of the Chondrosteidae inside Acipenseriformes.	
Hybodus	H. hauffianus; H. spp.	Klein Lehmhagen pit, Grimmen; Ahrensburg erratic assemblage	Fragmentary Fin spine; Supposed coprolithes; Teeth	Member of the Hybodontiformes.	Hybodus hauffianus
Lepidotes	L. buelowianus; L. elvensis; L. spp.	Klein Lehmhagen pit, Grimmen; Dobbertin; Ahrensburg Erratic Assemblage	Various specimens	Member of the family Lepidotidae inside Lepisosteiformes.	L. buelowianus
Lepisosteidae	Indeterminate	Grimmen	GG 439/4-7 scales	The oldest confirmed true Gar, member of the Lepisosteidae.	Lepisosteus extant example of Gar
Leptolepidae	Indeterminate	Former clay pit of Dobbertin	Isolated head with missing postcranial bones; Assigned Teeth	Member of the family Leptolepidae.	
Leptolepis	L. bronni; L. coryphaenoides; L. normandica; L. jaegeri; L. spp.	Klein Lehmhagen pit, Grimmen; Dobbertin clay pit; Karziger Ufer; Müssentin; Broock; Hohenbarnekow; Grenzin; Groß Roge; Elmenhorst; Klütz Höved; Pinnow; Consrade; Ahrensburg	Slightly disarticulated, incomplete head; Subadult, almost complete; fragmentary head; isolated head with pectoral girdle; incomplete head; Isolated remains in form of "Grätensandsteine"	Type member of the family Leptolepidae. The most abundant vertebrate recovered on the formation, including 3D preserved specimens, as well, is the main component of the Fishbone sandstones from the upper layers.	Leptolepis
Lycopteroidarum	L. sp. A; L. sp. B	Ahrensburg Erratic Assemblage	Otoliths	Otoliths of the family Lycopteroidea inside Lycopteriformes.	
Mengius	M. acutidens	Klein Lehmhagen pit, Grimmen; Schwinzer Ziegelei ca 3 km E of Dobbertin	Holotype: Articulated, incomplete fish; Referred articulated, semiarticulated and fragmentary specimens	Member of the family Lepidotidae inside Lepisosteiformes. Stomach content is also preserved on a specimen from Dobbertin, and is composed by arthropod cuticles.	
Pachycormiformes	Indeterminate	Klein Lehmhagen pit, Grimmen	Unknown, only cited.	Member of the family Pachycormiformes.	
Pholidophorus	P. sp.	Ahrensburg Erratic Assemblage	Assigned Fragmentary remains	Member of the family Pholidophoriformes.	
Pholidophoriformes	Indeterminate	Klein Lehmhagen pit, Grimmen	Isolated skull roof with articulated ethmoid region, parasphenoid, and partial braincase	Member of the family Pholidophoriformes. Resembles Pholidophoroides crenulata and P. limbata.	
Proleptolepis	P. sp.	Klein Lehmhagen pit, Grimmen	MV 202612, fragmentary head .; Assigned Teeth	Member of the family Leptolepidae. Specimens attributed to Proleptolepis have previously been reported only from the Sinemurian of western Europe.	
Saurorhynchus	S. hauffi; S. sp.	Klein Lehmhagen pit, Grimmen; Dobbertin	Diganostic Incomplete skull; Incomplete skull	The youngest representative of the family Saurichthyidae. Distinctive for its large jaws, similar to modern Belonidae.	Saurorhynchus
Tetragonolepis	T. semicincta	Klein Lehmhagen pit, Grimmen	Incomplete specimen; Isolated Jaw	Member of the family Dapediidae.	Tetragonolepis

==== Amniotes ====
Genus	Species	Stratigraphic position	Material	Notes	Images
Ichthyosauria	Indeterminate	Klein Lehmhagen pit, Grimmen; Ahrensburg Erratic Assemblage	Presacral centrum; 2 ?sacral centrum; Isolated vertebrae	Incertae sedis	
Macrospondylus	M. bollensis	Klein Lehmhagen pit, Grimmen	Incomplete skull and associated osteoderm	A marine crocodrylomorph, member of the family Machimosauridae. GG 422/6 can be clearly referred to an immature individual.	Macrospondylus
Megalosauridae	Indeterminate	Forst Hagen gravel pit	Dorsal vertebrae	A theropod, member of the family Megalosauridae. Was referred to Megalosaurus. The vertebrae centrum measures 80 mm, implying a medium-sized theropod (~5 m long).	Marshosaurus, example of basal Orionides
Mesoeucrocodylia	Indeterminate	Klein Lehmhagen pit, Grimmen	Cervical vertebra	A crocodrilian, member of Mesoeucrocodylia. Is considered to come from an osteologically immature individual.	
Meyerasaurus	M. sp.	Ahrensburg Erratic Assemblage	Incomplete coracoid; Associated rib	A pliosauroid, member of the family Rhomaleosauridae.	Meyerasaurus
Mystriosaurus	M. sp.	Klein Lehmhagen pit, Grimmen	Partial rostrum with teeth	A marine crocodrylomorph, member of the family Teleosauridae. Is indicative of a juvenile individual, with expected around 200–250 mm long skull and the entire animal about 1.50 m.	
Neoichthyosauria	Indeterminate	Clay Pit of Dobbertin	Four articulated tail vertebrae.	An indeterminate ichthyosaur, has been assigned to the species Stenopterygius longifrons.	
Ophthalmosauridae?	Indeterminate	Klein Lehmhagen pit, Grimmen	Partial skull and associated postcranial elements preserved in a concretion	It has an expanded basipterygoid process on the basisphenoid, only currently known in members of the Ophthalmosauridae	
Plesiosauria	Indeterminate	Klein Lehmhagen pit, Grimmen; Dobbertin, falciferum zone	Three caudal vertebrae and other postcranial elements; Gastralia; Phalanx; Cervical rib and other postcranial elements	Incertae sedis	
Plesiosauroidea	Indeterminate	Klein Lehmhagen pit, Grimmen	Cervical centrum; Caudal centrum	Incertae sedis	
Pterosauria?	Indeterminate	Klein Lehmhagen pit, Grimmen	GG 510, fragmentary tibiofibular(?)	A possible pterosaur bone, with features similar to the tibiofibular of coeval taxon Dorygnathus banthensis. Alternatively it can be another type of bone and belong to stem-turtles, plesiosaurs, dinosaurs or even anurans.	Dorygnathus banthensis, know from inner localities, has shared features that may suggest GG 510 is from a Pterosaur
Seeleyosaurus	S.? sp.	Ahrensburg Erratic Assemblage	Three articulated dorsal vertebrae	A plesiosaur, member of the family Plesiosauridae.	Seeleysaurus
Stenopterygius	S. cf. quadriscissus	Clay pit of Dobbertin	Posterior left half of the cranium.	An ichthyosaur of the family Stenopterygiidae.	Restoration
Teleosauridae	Indeterminate	Ahrensburg Erratic Assemblage	Osteoderms; Isolated non described remains	Incertae sedis	
Temnodontosaurus	T. cf. platyodon	Ahrensburg Erratic Assemblage	Skull; Coracoid; Associated rib fragment	An icthyosaur, type member of Temnodontosauridae. Assigned to Ichthyosaurus sp., but also suggested affinities to "Leptopterygius" (= Temnodontosaurus) platyodon.	Restoration

=== Flora ===
Genus	Species	Stratigraphic position	Material	Notes	Images
Botryococcus	B. sp.	Grimmen clay pit	Freshwater algae	Indicates freshwater influx in palynofacies assemblage IV, associated with coastal or deltaic settings.	
Equisetites	E. sp.; E. cf. Münsteri; E. columnare	Glacial Erratic Near; Grimmen; Dobbertin; Ahrensburg area; Erratic deposit near Lüttow	Isolated stems, rhizomes	Equisetalean stems of the family Equisetidae. Dominant in mono-to oligotypic stands near water bodies, indicative of high terrestrial input in palynofacies assemblages I and IV.	
Erlansonisporites	E. sparassis; E. sp.	Grimmen clay pit	Megaspores	Affinities with the Selaginellaceae. Transported from northern sources (e.g., Fennoscandia), indicative of humid climates.	
Hughesisporites	H. pustulatus	Grimmen clay pit	Megaspores	Affinities with the Selaginellaceae. Likely transported via suspension load plumes, reflecting freshwater influx.	
Minerisporites	M. institus; M. volucris	Grimmen clay pit	Megaspores	Affinities with the Selaginellaceae. Associated with warm, humid conditions and high atmospheric CO2.	
Pagiophyllum	P. sp.; P. cf. Kurri	Grimmen clay pit	Leaves, driftwood	Conifer macrofossils of the family Cheirolepidiaceae or Araucariaceae. High phytoclasts and cuticles in palynofacies assemblages I, II, and IV support conifer presence.	
Paxillitriletes	P. phyllicus	Grimmen clay pit; Reinberg 1E	Megaspores	Affinities with the Isoetales. Transported from Fennoscandia, indicates humid climate, biostratigraphic marker (Paxillitriletes phyllicus Zone, also seen in the Ciechocinek Formation)	Extant Isoetes, typical example of Isoetales. Paxillitriletes probably come from a similar or a related Plant
Striatriletes	S. excavatus	Grimmen clay pit	Megaspores	Affinities with the Selaginellaceae. Reflects freshwater influx from northern sources.	
Trileites	T. spp.	Grimmen clay pit	Megaspores	Affinities with lycophytes or ferns. Indicates diverse megaspore flora transported from northern sources.	

== See also ==
- List of fossiliferous stratigraphic units in Germany
- Toarcian turnover
- Posidonia Shale Formation
