= Liassoscorpionides =

Liassoscorpionides Temporal range: Early Toarcian, 182.7–180.4 Ma

Scientific classification
- Kingdom: Animalia
- Phylum: Arthropoda
- Subphylum: Chelicerata
- Class: Arachnida
- Order: Scorpiones
- Family: †Liassoscorpionididae
- Genus: †Liassoscorpionides; Bode 1951

Species
- †Liassoscorpionides schmidti Bode, 1951

Synonyms
- Mesophonus infans? E Wills, 1947

Extinct genus of scorpions

Liassoscorpionides is an extinct genus of scorpions from the Toarcian of Germany. It was found on the Posidonia Shale, on the so-called Mergelgrube “insect bed” of Hondelage near Braunschweig, on a layer, as its name suggests, full of insect genera. Liassoscorpionides is the only confirmed jurassic scorpion discovered. Liassoscorpionides represented a relatively small genus with a morphology resembing the extant genus Hadogenes.

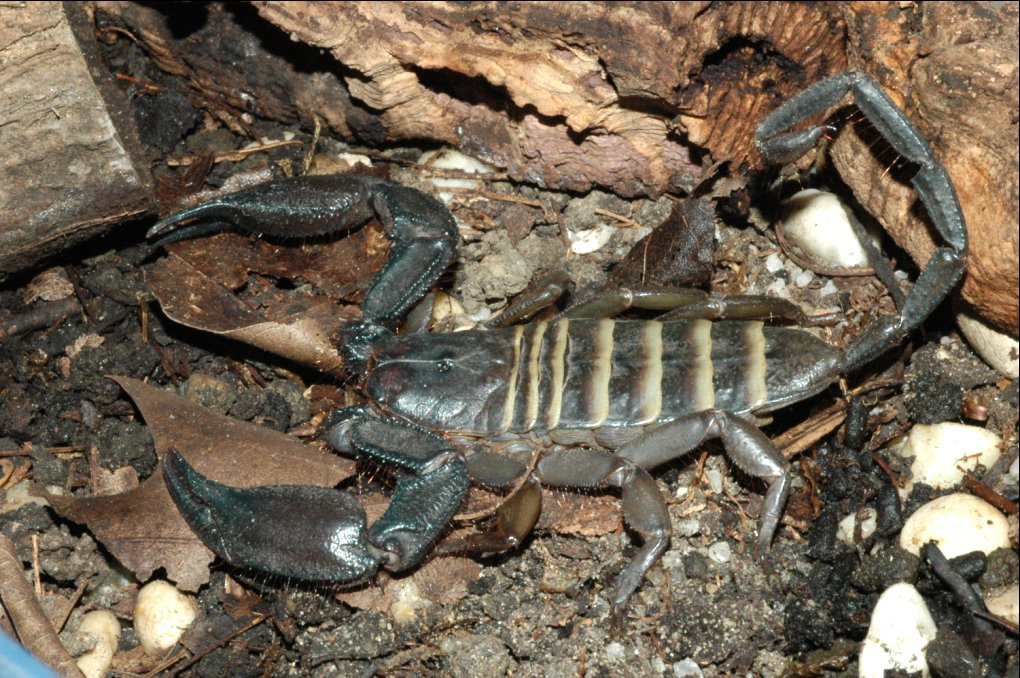
While not closely related, Liassoscorpionides was morphologically similar to extant Hadogenes

The holotype, GZG G525-1, consists of a partial body fossil, measuring 14.4 mm in length and 4.8 mm in width. The preserved elements include a thin, short postabdomen (¼ metasoma), granulation of the carapace (¼ dorsal shield of the Prosoma), ornament on the posterior tergite margins resembling hatching, and a weak and delicate pedipalpal claw (supposedly superimposed from beneath the body). A median gut trace and a feature representing either a Runzelung (wrinkle) or a stigma (¼ spiracle) on the margin of at least the fifth Mesosomal segment was described, but its presence is controversial. Later, the original material was restudied and resolved numerous new features.

Liassoscorpionides was originally referred to a new, monotypic family, Liassoscorpionididae. Being the only Jurassic scorpion known, there is no evidence that L. schmidti was aquatic (which was suggested in the past) and in the absence of further, better preserved material it should be excluded from future considerations of broad patterns of scorpion evolution. Some works considered it even a nomen dubium. However a more recent work has retailed its validity, yet leaving unclear its affinities, maybe a relative of the Triassic Mesophonidae. Even more recent work found it as valid, yet Scorpiones incertae sedis. With the spider Seppo koponeni is one of the two only known arachnids from the Lower Jurassic of Germany.
