= Aenne =

Aenne is a German-language feminine given name. Notable people with the name include:

- Aenne Biermann (1898–1933), German photographer
- Aenne Brauksiepe (1912–1997), German politician
- Aenne Burda (1909–2005), German publisher
- Aenne Franz (1923–2023), German dialect writer
- Aenne Goldschmidt (1920–2020), Swiss expressionist dancer, choreographer, and pedagogue
- Aenne Michalsky (1908–1986), Austrian operatic soprano
- Aenne Willkomm (1902–1979), German costume designer
