= North German basin =

Passive-active rift basin in central and west Europe

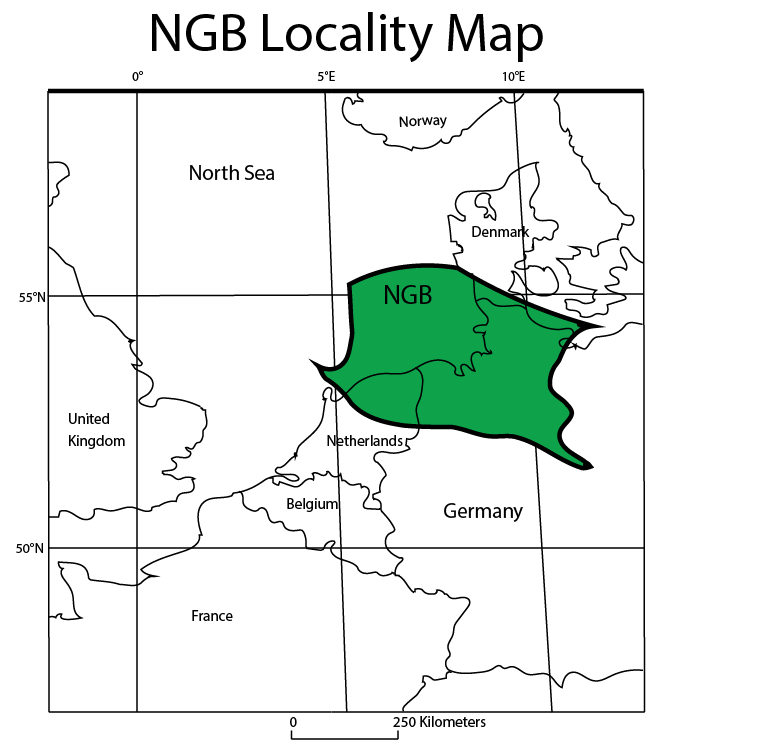
The North German Basin located in western Europe, represented as the green region defined by USGS

The North German Basin is a passive-active rift basin located in central and west Europe, lying within the southeasternmost portions of the North Sea and the southwestern Baltic Sea and across terrestrial portions of northern Germany, Netherlands, and Poland. The North German Basin is a sub-basin of the Southern Permian Basin, that accounts for a composite of intra-continental basins composed of Permian to Cenozoic sediments, which have accumulated to thicknesses around 10–12 kilometres (6–7.5 mi). The complex evolution of the basin takes place from the Permian to the Cenozoic, and is largely influenced by multiple stages of rifting, subsidence, and salt tectonic events. The North German Basin also accounts for a significant amount of Western Europe's natural gas resources, including one of the world's largest natural gas reservoir, the Groningen gas field.

== Regional tectonic evolution ==
The regional tectonic evolution of the North German Basin coincides with of the evolution of the Southern Permian Basin, the basin across central and western Europe. From the late Neoproterozoic Era to Carboniferous Period, Europe underwent the Caledonian Orogeny and Variscan Orogeny. These crustal accretion events produced the present day regional lithosphere, and by the time of the post-orogenic collapse of the Variscan Orogeny the supercontinent Pangea had completely formed. After the formation of Pangea, much of the region underwent crustal instability and thus developing the extensive Permo-Carboniferous magmatic province. This magmatism led to the extrusion of abundant volcanic successions such as the Northeast German Basin, Northwest Polish Basin, and Oslo Rift, while also causing the formation of 70 rift basins throughout the Permian Basin. The regions most evolved and voluminous magmatism occurred within the North German Basin dating back to 297-302 Ma.

== Basin evolution ==
=== Initial rifting ===
The initiation of the Northern German Basin took place in the Late Carboniferous approximately 295-285 Ma (Million Years Ago) in association collapse of the Variscan Orogeny due to wrenching tectonics in the over-thickened crust in the northern foreland of the Variscan Orogeny. The initiation formed by crustal rifting and wrenching in addition to huge amounts of volcanism(>40,000 km^{3} ) and magmatism, can only be approximately dated due to the extensive (>250 Ma) poly-phased subsidence of the region. The most evident dating method has been done using SHRIMP (Sensitive High-Resolution Ion Microprobe) Zircon ages, allowing for dating of sediments produced during the magmatic flare-up during the Permian. The wrench tectonics, magmatic inflation, and mantle lithosphere erosion took place gave a regional uplift allowing for an increase in crustal erosion.

=== Main phase of subsidence ===
20 million years post-rifting, the North German Basin experienced a rapid accumulation of sediments, >2,700 m (8,900 ft) of strata from the Upper Rotliegend Unit to the Bunter Unit, thus experiencing maximum thermal subsidence from the Late Permian to the Middle Triassic. This rapid burial of sediments lead to subsidence rates of 220 m per million years due to the drastic increase in crustal load. Another important influence of this subsidence is due to the thermal relaxation of the lithospheric magmatic inflation, thus allowing the basin to deepen with the accumulation of the sediment.

=== Secondary rifting ===
During the Triassic-Early Jurassic, 252 to 200 Ma, there was a phase of new north to south rifting events due to the break up of the super-continent Pangea caused W-E extension across the Northern German Basin. These extensions in the crust created the Triassic grabens such as the local the Gluckstadt Graben, while also initiating the salt tectonics seen in the region. This rifting event was then followed by another phase of subsidence due to sedimentary loading and lithospheric thermal relaxation.

=== Doming ===
During the Middle-Late Jurassic, the center of the North Sea underwent a doming acknowledged by the Middle Jurassic erosional unconformity, the erosion of >1,000 m (3,300 ft) of Upper Triassic and Lower Jurassic strata. The dome raised above sea level during the Middle Jurassic and began to deflate due to rifting in the Late Jurassic. Though the mechanism forming the North Sea Rift Dome is not particularly well understood, the development of the dome seems to be consistent with an active rift model having a broad-based (1,250 km or 780 mi diameter) plume head influencing the Late Jurassic rifting.

=== Tertiary rifting ===
In the Late Jurassic, the third rifting event took place in response to the North Sea doming event. Major extensional faulting and rifting began approximately 157-155 Ma allowing for the Zechstein evaporites to form a detachment between basement rocks and upper stratigraphy largely influencing the natural gas and oil formation seen across the North German Basin. Organic-rich mudstones from the Kimmeridge Clay Formation is the source of the majority of the North German Basin's hydrocarbons which was restricted from migrating upward by the Zechstein salt.

=== Inversion ===
In the Late Cretaceous, a significant phase of inversion took place due to the reactivation of strike-slip basement faults. Inversion of the region responded significantly to the orientation of compression, such that faults like the E-W Elbe Fault System was inverted 3–4 km (1.9–2.5 mi) while the N-S Grabens did not experience significant uplift.

=== Final subsidence ===
During the Cenozoic, the last phase of subsidence occurred. During the Oligocene to Miocene, many of the basement faults were reactivated by the strike-slip faults during the Late Cretaceous inversion. The reactivation of these basement faults triggered more halokinesis. Slight inversion due to the salt tectonics allowed for minor amounts of Miocene and Pliocene deposits, which were later buried by widespread delta and glacial deposits during the Quaternary, resulting in rapid subsidence.

== Stratigraphy ==
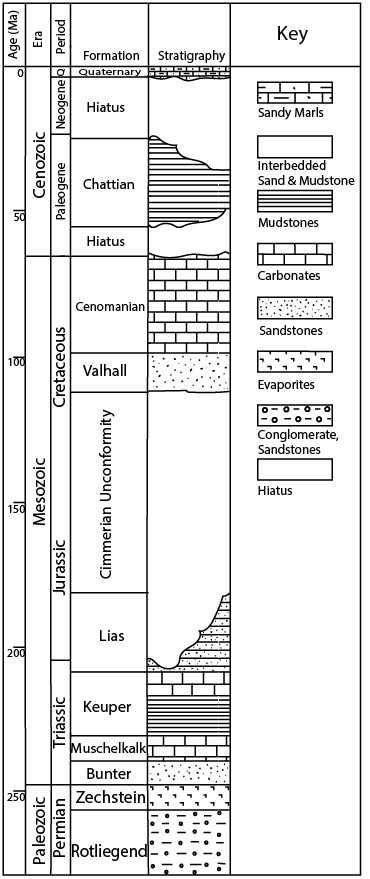
This figure breaks down the stratigraphic units of the North German Basin through time.

The depositional history of the North German Basin is recorded within the stratigraphy sequence of sediments, which make up the basin. The poly-phase deposition of the basin can be broken down into strati-graphic units, each with their own distinct characteristics. The sedimentary basin was assembled above the Lower Paleozoic crystalline basement formed during the Caledonian Orogeny about 420-400 Ma.

=== Paleozoic era ===
- The lowermost stratigraphic unit, the Lower Rotliegend Group is made up of Permo-Carboniferous volcanic, composed primarily ignimbrites, rhyolites, and andesites, while also having minor amounts basalts. These volcanic sediments have a range of thickness from 1,600–2,500 metres (5,200–8,200 ft) across the basin, trending to be thickest in the east near the Rheinsberg Lineament and thinnest in the south near the Elbe Fault System.
- The sediments deposited during the Lower Permian are from the Upper Rotliegend Group, specifically the Parchim Formation thought to have been deposited from 266 to 264 Ma. These aeolian and fluvial sandstones and siltstones have a maximum thickness of 900 m (3,000 ft).
- In the Upper Permian, the Zechstein Unit began to accumulate on top of the Rotliegend Unit around 260 Ma. The Zechstein Unit is composed of alternating layers of carbonates and evaporate deposits, such as anhydrite and halite. The thickness of the Zechstein is extremely diverse due to post-depositional salt tectonics, though there is a general increase in thickness in the northwestern region of the North German Basin.

=== Mesozoic era ===
- In the Lower Triassic, the Bunter Unit was deposited over the Zechstein Unit. The Bunter Unit is composed of red sandstone beds with minor conglomerates and clay. The original thickness of the unit has been deformed due to salt tectonics though it is apparent that the sedimentation of the Bunter Unit reached the northernmost margin of the North German Basin, over the depocenter at which 1,400 m (4,600 ft) of fluvial, lacustrine, and playa-lake deposits of Bunter had accumulated.
- In the Middle Triassic, the Muschelkalk carbonates accumulated up to 100 m (330 ft) in depth from 240 to 230 Ma. The abundance of mussel shells found within the alternating limestone and dolomite beds lead to the units name Muschelkalk, translating to "mussel chalk" in German.
- In the Middle-Late Triassic, the Keuper Unit composed of dolomite, shale, and evaporites accumulated up to approximately 1,200 m (3,900 ft). The Keuper Unit is divided into three groups: the Upper Keuper primarily a grey dolomite and impure coals, the Hauptkeuper primarily marls, gypsum, and dolomite, and lastly the Kohlenkeuper primarily clays and sandstone.
- In the Late Upper Triassic to the Lower Jurassic, the Lias Unit is composed of sandstone, shale, limestone, and clay. This unit was deposited between 200- 180 Ma, though is particularly difficult to define a thickness due to a large hiatus, which occurs above this unit. This pause in deposition, the late Cimmerian Unconformity lasted until the Middle Cretaceous approximately 110 Ma.
- In the Lower Cretaceous, the Valhall Formation appears at the end of the late Cimmerian Unconformity. The Valhall Formation consist mainly of shale, limestone, and sandstone having a 10–40-metre (33–131 ft) thickness. This Formation is followed by the Cenomanian transgression, taking place during the Upper Cretaceous specifically during the Cenomanian. This unit is composed mainly of chalky limestone and marls accumulated from 400 to 550 m (1,310 to 1,800 ft) in thickness. There is another hiatus from the Upper Cretaceous ending during the start of the Eocene.

=== Cenozoic era ===
- Lastly during the Cenozoic specifically during the Eocene through the Oligocene, the Chattian Unit formed approximately 30 Ma. This unit is primarily composed of alternating layers of sandstone and mudstone. There is another hiatus between the Chattian Unit and the Quaternary Unit, which was deposited within the past 2 Ma. This Unit is primarily composed of Quaternary glacial sediments.

== Energy resources ==
The North German Basin has a particularly abundance of natural gas. These large hydrocarbon accumulations have been created and clumped together by a single total petroleum system (TPS) called the Carboniferous-Rotliegend TPS. Approximately 85% of all gas production has been from the Rotliegend Group aeolian sandstones preserved by the Zechstein Unit, while 13% can be contributed to the Triassic fluvial sandstones, also preserved by the Zechstein Unit but due to the migration of salt rather than chronologically being placed below the Zechstein Unit. The Groningen Gas Field is the located below a region northeast Netherland is the basins largest reserve and also happens to be one of the largest gas fields in the world holding up to 100 trillion cubic feet (2.8×10^{12} m^{3}) of natural gas. The North German Basin along with the Anglo-Dutch Basin and the North Sea Graben Province, contain the majority of oil and gas reserves identified throughout Western Europe.
