= Liadotaulius =

Liadotaulius Temporal range: Toarcian–Callovian

Scientific classification
- Kingdom: Animalia
- Phylum: Arthropoda
- Clade: Pancrustacea
- Class: Insecta
- Order: Trichoptera
- Family: Philopotamidae (?)
- Genus: †Liadotaulius; Handlirsch, 1939

Type species
- †Liadotaulius acutipennis (= †Necrotaulius maior Handlirsch, 1906) Handlirsch, 1939

Species
- See text.

Synonyms
- †Oncovena Novokshonov & Sukatsheva, 1995

Extinct genus of caddisflies

Liadotaulius is an extinct genus of caddisflies. It is currently (tentatively) placed in the family Philopotamidae, though it has previously been placed in the extinct families Necrotauliidae and Dysoneuridae.

== Species ==
- †Liadotaulius borealis (Novokhonov & Sukatsheva, 1995)
- †Liadotaulius daohugouensis Wu & Huang, 2012
- †Liadotaulius korujensis (Sukatsheva, 1990)
- †Liadotaulius limus Zhang, Shih & Ren, 2016
- †Liadotaulius maior (Handlirsch, 1906)
- †Liadotaulius sharategensis (Ivanov & Novokshonov, 1995)
- †Liadotaulius shewjensis (Sukatsheva, 1990)
