= Aenne Franz =

German writer (1923–2023)

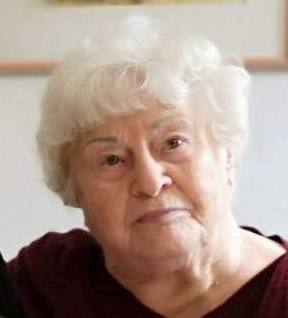
- Franz in 2020
- Born: 21 October 1923 Solingen, Prussia
- Died: 7 April 2023 (aged 99) Solingen, Germany
- Occupation: Writer

Aenne Franz (21 October 1923 – 7 April 2023) was a German dialect writer active in Solingen. In 1991, Franz received the Baden Citizens' Foundation's Culture Prize for services to the cultivation of the Solingen dialect.

== Life ==
Franz was born on 21 October 1923 in Solingen, Prussia (present-day Germany) to a social democratic family. Her father was in the Social Democratic Party of Germany from 1919. During the Nazi era she did her Reich labor service in Thuringia. After the World War II, she took part in the reconstruction of the Social Democratic Party of Germany and the Workers' Welfare Association (AWO) in Solingen from 1947 onwards. In 1949, together with Karl Schröder, she was involved in organizing the AWO Reichstag in Solingen.

From 1967 she was active in the dialect group “De Hangkgeschmedden”, for many years as their boss. Her poems and stories have been published in the Solinger Tageblatt and in four anthologies by Verlag B. Boll. She also worked as a dialect speaker for West German Radio Westdeutscher Rundfunk. In 1983 she led the group of Rhenish dialect writers Bergisches Land as a regional group in the group of Rhenish dialect writers. She left large parts of her dialect text collection, including historical ones, to the Solingen city archives.

== Awards ==
For her services to the cultivation of the Solingen dialect, De Hangkgeschmedden received the Baden Citizens' Foundation's Culture Prize in 1991. In 2012, Aenne Franz received an honor for her 65 years of membership in the SPD, followed in 2018 by another for her 70 years of membership. At the beginning of 2013, she resigned from her position as auditor of the AWO and, as a thank you, received the “Open Heart”, the symbol of the AWO, which was designed as a metal work of art by the youth welfare workshop.

== Death ==
From 1951 to 1980, Aenne Franz was married to the businessman Ernst Franz. Her daughter is the journalist Renate Franz. Aenne Franz died on 7 April 2023, aged 99.
