= Gyrinulopsis =

Gyrinulopsis nanus Temporal range: Early Toarcian

Scientific classification
- Kingdom: Animalia
- Phylum: Arthropoda
- Class: Insecta
- Order: Coleoptera
- Suborder: Adephaga
- Family: Gyrinidae
- Genus: †Gyrinulopsis; Handlirsch, 1906
- Species: †G. nanus

Binomial name
- †Gyrinulopsis nanus Handlirsch, 1906

Genus of beetles

Gyrinulopsis nanus is an extinct species of fossil beetle from the Ciechocinek Formation of the Lower Toarcian of Germany in the family Gyrinidae, the only species in the genus Gyrinulopsis.
