= Blanowice Formation =

Geologic formation in Częstochowa, Poland

- Stratigraphic range: Late Pliensbachian to Lower Toarcian; ~185–180 Ma
- Type: Geological formation
- Unit of: Kamienna Group
- Sub-units: Siewierz Area; Zawiercie; Wysoka mine; Blanowice Brown Coals
- Underlies: Ciechocinek Formation, Borucice Formation
- Overlies: Zagaje, Lobez, Ostrowiec & Gielniów Formations
- Thickness: Up to ~42.0 m (137.8 ft)

Lithology
- Primary: Sandstones, subordinately Mudstones, Heteroliths y Coal seams.
- Other: Several types of heteroliths and mudstones

Location
- Region: Częstochowa, Southern Poland
- Country: Poland
- Extent: Czêstochowa region

Type section
- Named for: Blanowice, a town from Zawiercie, Poland
- Named by: Znosko (as an informal unit)
- Blanowice Formation (Poland)

The Blanowice Formation is a geologic formation in Częstochowa, Poland. It is late Pliensbachian-Lowermost Toarcian age. Plant fossils have been recovered from this formation. Along with the Drzewica Formation is part of the Depositional sequence IV-VII of the late lower Jurassic Polish Basin. Deposits of sequences IV, V, VI and VII make up the Blanowice Formation, being all four sequences are of Pliensbachian age, documented by megaspores (Horstisporites). On the upper strata, "sub-coal beds" cover the sequence VII-lower VIII (Pliensbachian-Toarcian transition), while the uppermost part of VIII is identified with the Ciechocinek Formation. The Blanowice Formation has been known for decades thanks to the abundant plant fossils and plant roots, but mostly due to the Blanowice Brown Coals, where the oldest Biomolecules found worldwide have been recovered. The Mrzygłód mine dinocyst assemblage is taxonomically undiversified, containing specimens that are good age indicators allowing relatively precise suggestion of its age. Luehndea spinosa, with a single recovered specimen spans between the Late Pliensbachian (Margaritaus) to the Lowermost Toarcian (Tenuicostatum). Other ocal dinocysts such as Mendicodinium range Late Pliensbachian–Aalenian, a wider stratigraphic range. The lower part of the formation is coeval in age with the Gielniów Formation and Drzewica Formation (Southern and central Poland), Lobez Formation and Komorowo Formation (Pomerania), Olsztyn Formation (Baltic German-Polish transition), the lower part of the Rydeback Member of the Rya Formation (Southern Sweden), lower Fjerritslev or Gassum Formation (Danish Basin), lower and middle Sorthat Formation (Bornholm), Neringa Formation (Lithuania). The upper part is coeval with the lowermost upper Rydeback Member, upper Gassum Formation and lower Lava Formation (Lithuania).

== Mining ==
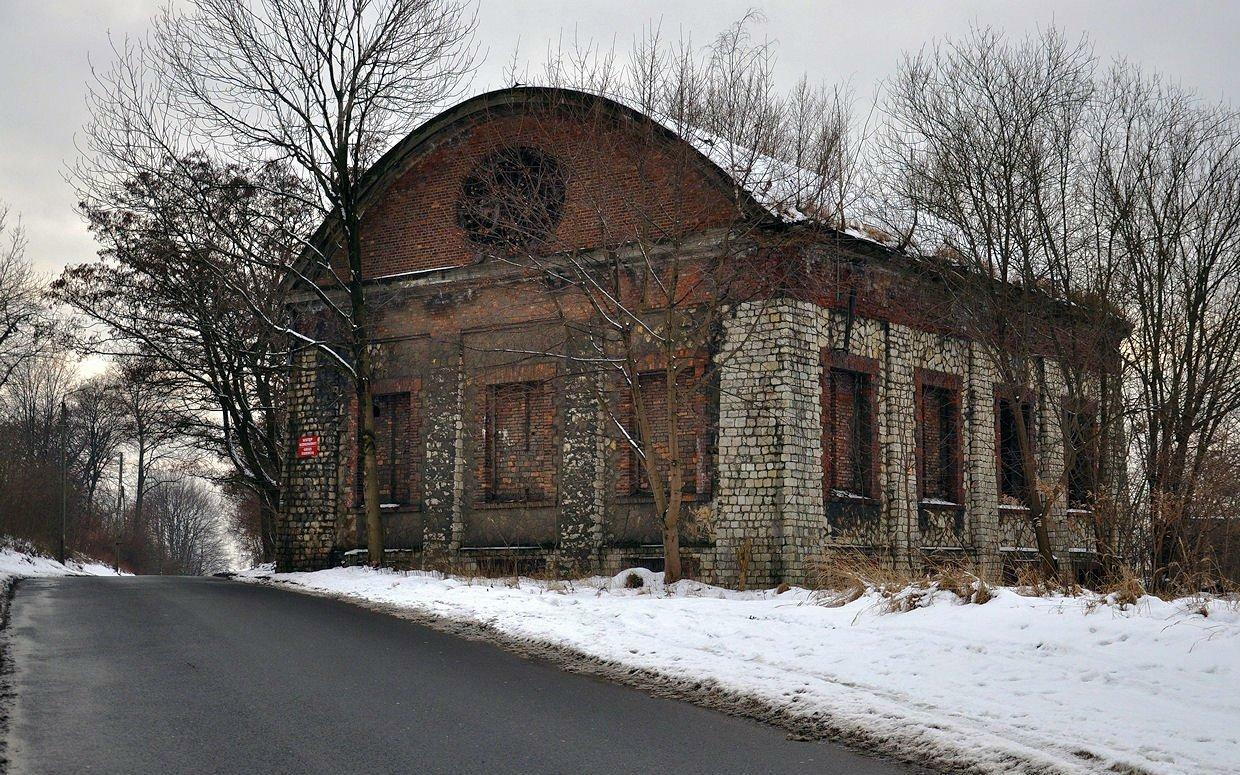
"Zygmunt" mine, the largest mining group working with the Blanowice Coals.

The local Mesozoic brown Coal is composed by Lignite of Lower Jurassic age, known as the Blanowice Coal. Increased carbon-bearing capacity, locally present in the profile of the Upper Forest land sediments, was the basis for the development coal mining in this area in the years 1818–1959. The mining center at that time was concentrated in the vicinity of Poręba near Zawiercie, as well as in a dozen other towns (Sprawowice, Blanowice, Łazy, Siewierz). Its basis was shallow exploitation a coal seam with a thickness of up to 2.0 m. Occurrence of Blanowice Coals in Jurassic outcrops between Częstochowa and Zawiercie was known for a long time. Already in the 1890s, they were mined on a small scale in the vicinity of Blanowice, being described since the start of the exploitation. After 1796 on Siewiersk was reported hard coal, the first outcrop of the main Blanowice Fm coal. The mining of Blanowice Coals developed specially in the 1920s and 1930s, where major discoveries were reported. This coals were exploited on small exploitations, where various minor mines recovered the coal seams. The "Zygmunt" mine, operating at the turn of the 1920s and 1930s, was one of the largest. Annual production, as shown in official documents, it exceeded the total output from other mines many times.

== Stratigraphy ==
The best lithological profile of the productive section of the Blanowice Formation was developed on the basis of the exposure in the trench made in Kierszula near Poręba. On this exposure, the major data of the Blanowice strata was recovered. The lower layers are above the Hettangian to Sinemurian Zagaje Formation. Mostly the local successions start with the Blanowice Formation, which rests with a large stratigraphic hiatus on Upper Triassic strata. While some terrestrial sediments maybe were deposited here during Hettangian–Sinemurian, but removed during the Late Sinemurian. From the upper part is developed an initial level of up to 0.61 m thick, where there are clay deposits separated by a layer of Sandstone, mostly carbonaceous with numerous plant detritus, with a total thickness of 1.82 m. At 2.43 m of depth, a shoal of slightly weathered coal, and below, at a distance of 0.62 m - a coal layer of 1.09 m thick, where the contact of the coal with the surrounding rocks is clearly marked. This strata is laminated separating series of layers with anthracoliths, characterized by an abundance of plant detritus. Near the floor of this section, the amount of sand increases and there are sections with transition into Mud, and even Sandstone. At the bottom, with a depth of 4.75 m a major layer of clay is present, which in the lower section is characterized by an abundance of plant detritus. Finally, on the Kierszula pit, under the bottom surface of the coal seam and the accompanying shoal, fragments of root plants arranged most often in the position of their growth were found. These formations, up to 6.0 cm in length and up to 0.4 cm in thickness, mark the levels of the "root soil" that document the autochthonous and Tracolite genesis. The upper part of the formation is dominated by alluvial and Lacustrine/Backswamp sand and coal-bearing sediments.

=== Sedimentological Evolution ===
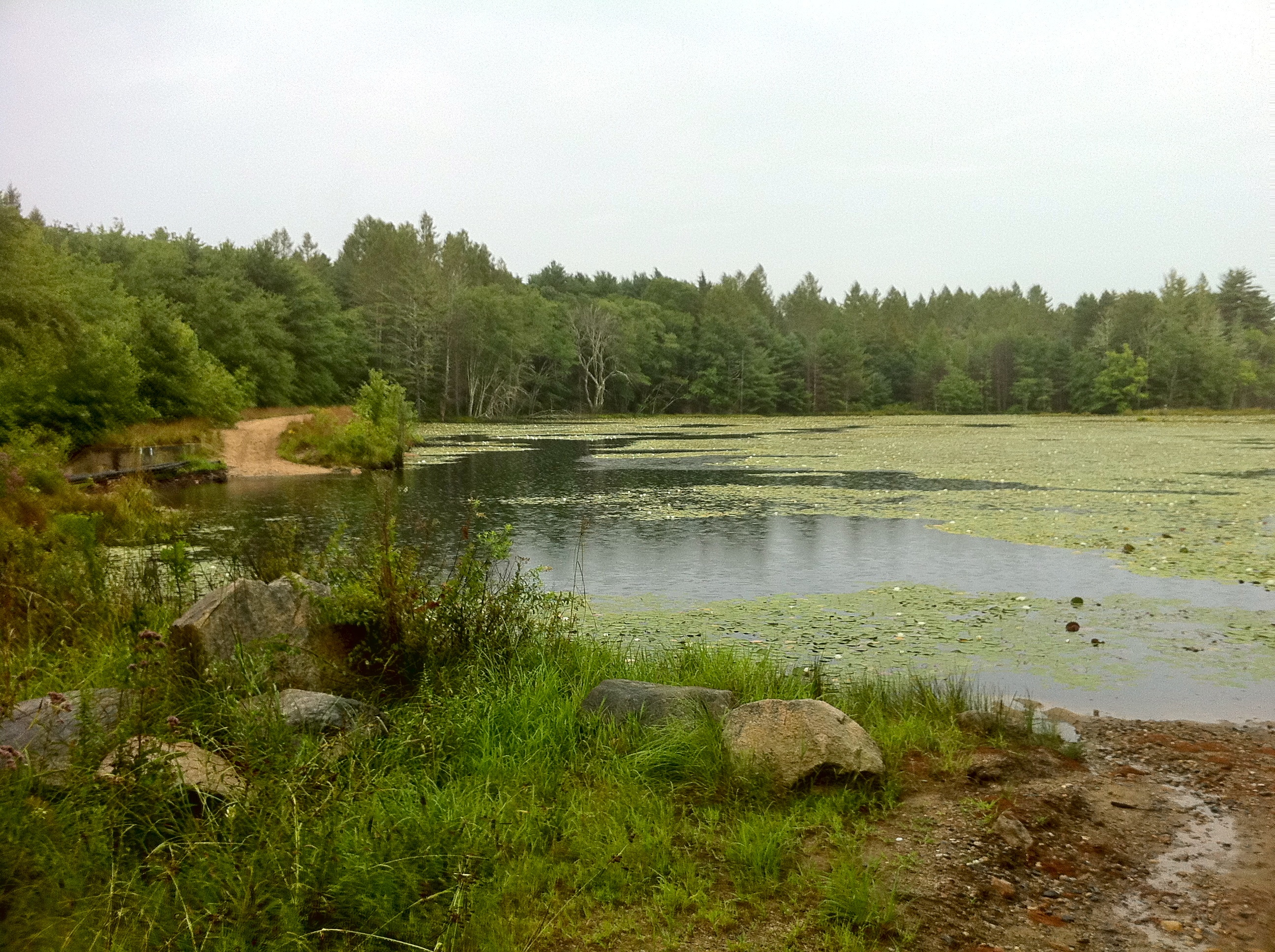
Swamps were common on the Bolesławiec 6 borehole, where mostly of the Coal Was deposited

The Blanowice Formation belong to the Częstochowa region of the sedimentological groups of the lower Jurassic Poland. This formation starts with the Sequence V, that along the Sequence VI form a very thin layer on the local strata, being absent from some places such as the Włodowice 52 BN borehole. Both sequences are locally very difficult to distinguish, as in places like the Wrêczyca 3/81 borehole the 2 along the VII are part of a series of amalgamated alluvial—meandering river deposits. Between the towns of Gmina Łęka Opatowska and Wrêczyca both V and VI represent alluvial—meandering river deposits and between Suliszowice and Parkoszowice is found a more wide diversity of the deposits origin, from deltaic-lagoonal in the Suliszowice 38 BN borehole to alluvial facies occur in Żarki 89 Ż borehole and again deltaic facies occur in Jaworznik 132 Ż borehole and the Parkoszowice 58 BN borehole.

On the Sequence VII, between Gmina Łęka Opatowska and Bolesławiec appear abundant coal-bearing deposits with numerous palaeosol horizons deposited by a lacustrine/backswamp depositional system. The coal deposits had a thickness of about 6 m on the Bolesławiec 6 borehole, which represents mostly terrestrial-derived strata. A similar coal-bearing lacustrine strata is found on the coeval Włodowice 52 BN borehole and in the major Parkoszowice 58 BN borehole, the most important recovered locally. The coal-bearing lacustrine strata is derived from the edges of the major local embayments, related with the coeval embayments-lagoonal settings, that are mostly recovered from the Nowa Wieś 12 borehole, the SE Suliszowice 38 BN borehole, Żarki 89 Ż borehole, Jaworznik 132 Ż borehole and finally on the Włodowice 52 BN is recovered a temporal frontal embayment. This marine boreholes had a similar nearshore facies across the boundaries of the sequences, and several fossils recovered point to a nearby connection with the Tethys Ocean at the south of the formation. The local Coal Bearing facies corresponds to the major flooding surface found on the depositional sequence VII. Near the own town of Częstochowa, on Wrêczyca there are abundant deposits from amalgamated alluvial facies (meandering river), that appear on the sequences V, VI and VII indicates persistent alluvial sedimentation through Pliensbachian times, that is referred to the local "Wrêczyca River". On the Toarcian, a major local transgression correlated with the Early Toarcian sea-level rise clearly recognized in Western Europe, the Silesian-Cracow area was encroached by the sea from the Polish Trough from the north and northeast, which resulted in the termination of alluvial sedimentation of the underlying uppermost part of the Blanowice Formation.

== Biota ==
The Blanowice Formation recovers a deltaic section on the eastern Bohemian Massif, where rivers come from the west, as proven by the Carboniferous fossil matter found on the layers of the formation, moved from the west of the Czech Republic, and deposited especially on the Parkoszowice borehole. The Borehole was part of southeastern part of the Polish Basin that during the Early Jurassic, where developed a shallow paralic environment, with organic carbon buried in nearshore marine environments due to intensified erosion. This Borehole shows enhanced biomass contribution from aquatic algae groups (Haptophyta, unicellular Rhodophyta and several marcoalgae), with measured proliferation of aquatic algae groups during the local parasequence "f", documented by increased abundances of 4-Methyldiasterenes, what proves a more marine influence than on other coeval boreholes, such as the Brody-Lubienia. There is also abundance on Parkoszowice show of 4Me-diasterenes with 28 carbon atoms, that are related with synthesized by methane oxidizing bacteria. Methanotrophs commonly occur in environments where methane is produced, and implicates the presence of local Wetlands, Marsh and Lagoon environments. It was proven that the formation was mostly Deltaic, alluvial and lacustrine, with increased marine influence on the Toarcian strata.

=== Coals ===
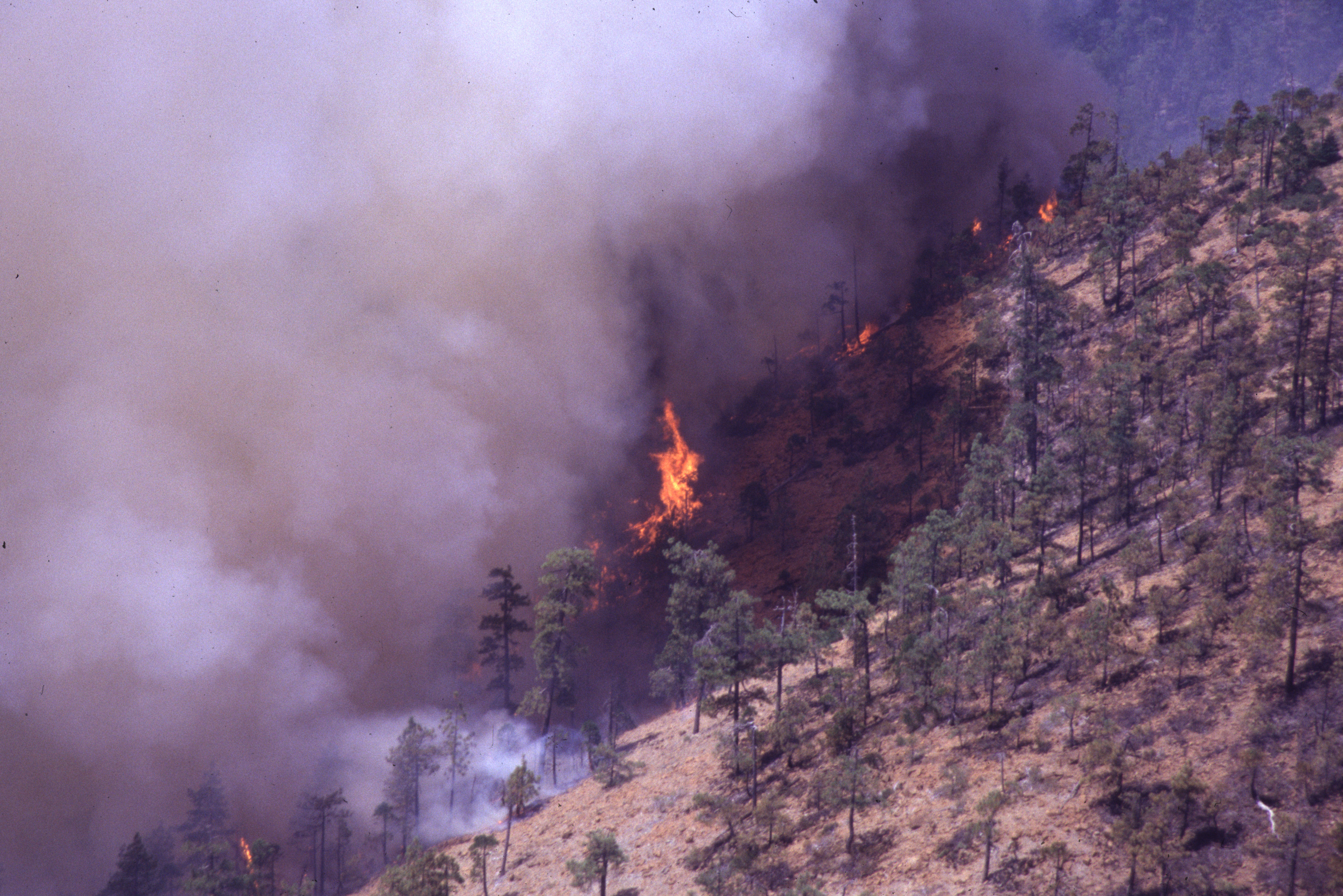
Wildfire activity increased on the upper part of the formation

The Blanowice Formation Brown Coals (Blanowice Coals) are part of the Łęka Coal Basin, and had been known since 1800 from its abundant deposits, where younger material has been suggested as redeposited from this deposits. In the Early Jurassic the Blanowice Beds were surrounded by land to the north, east and south making that terrestrial area the source of its sediments, that were deposited on a nearshore paralic coal. This coals are present especially on the upper part of the formation, dominated by alluvial and lacustrine/backswamp sand and coal-bearing sediments. The organic matter found associated with the local Coal includes the oldest known Biomolecules (On the Mrzygłód clay-pit), that are composed by Labdanoic Acid, Ferruginol, Sugiol and 7-Oxototarol. The extracted samples were recovered at the Wysoka Lelowska 47Ż borehole and Jaworznik 124Ż borehole, with five core samples were taken from Żarki 90Ż drill core, this last coming from a relatively large, ~ 1.5 m thickness, coal seam. The random reflectance (%Rr) of the coals is 0.47–0.56, indicating a subbituminous coal rank. The geochemical data suggest the low degree of thermal maturation of the samples, where the polar fractions are dominant in all samples, typical for immature sediments. Hopane isomers (that can be used for estimation of the organic matter maturity) are in relatively high amounts in all samples taken, suggesting immature character. This is also confirmed by the occurrence of unstable biomolecules in the coal samples, including Labdanoic Acid, Ferruginol, Sugiol, Oxototarol, Sitosterol and Cholesterol.

These coals are generally dominated by Vitrain macerals, with exceptions where there is a great percentage of Inertinite. This led to interpretation as a result of wildfire or peat fire activity, confirmed by the co-occurrence of charcoal fragments. Sesquiterpenoids and Diterpenoids were also recovered from the coal, common in Conifers as well as in other plants such as angiosperms and bryophytes. Vitrinite has local reflectance values of 0.49-0.56 %Ro. The Cupressaceae and/or Podocarpaceae families are considered the main peat-forming plant species (Due to the presence of phenolic Abietanes and dehydroabietic acids). Posterior revision of the Lignites of the Brown Coals had revealed a major distribution of Benzohopane derivatives in these coals and surrounding sandstones, that implicate probable differences in the degree of Biodegradation, and also a low Coalification range, typical of Lignites. Later largers studies cover a really big influence of the fires on the region.

After the Toarcian Anoxic Event on the called "Kaszewy-1" (where the Toarcian makes ~150 m of the strata) the Wildfire activity was widely recorded. The Structure of the main depositional setting has been seen divided in 3 parts: on the center, near Kaszewy Kościelne there was a major restricted brackish-marine basin, with seasonal influxes of marine water. The great abundance of Charcoal is the main indicator of the fire activity locally, but also the Polycyclic Aromatic Hydrocarbons, whose abundance reflects an increase in wildfire activity. Coarse Charcoal particles abundance is low, while the fine Charcoal particles are more abundant on nearly all the measured samples, vinculated to small reductions of the Sea Level locally. The most abundant Polycyclic Hydrocarbon found locally is Phenanthrene, and along the Charcoal data shows how the Fires locally increased around the Carbon Isotope Excursion on the Toarcian Anoxic Event Worldwide. Along this period, mostly of the strata of the region shows at least 6 periods of fire intensification, that are coeval to others found on Yorkshire, Wales and Peniche.

=== Dinoflagellates ===
On the Mrzygłód mine samples there is a domain of land-derived Phytoclasts and Palynomorphs, with abundance of the cyst Nannoceratopsis, that is considered a euryhaline genus. High amount of terrestrial organic matter shows that there was an intense supply and accumulation of land-derived organic particles from surrounding land areas, what, along with the decrease of salinity conditions, thanks to the dinocysts conclude that the assemblage represents a part of the Blanowice Formation deposited in a proximal area under brackish conditions, with possible changes on the range of salinity.

Genus	Species	Location	Material	Notes	Images
Nannoceratopsis	Nannoceratopsis pellucida; Nannoceratopsis deflandrei; Nannoceratopsis globiformis; Nannoceratopsis ridingii; Nannoceratopsis ?spiculata; Nannoceratopsis triceras; Nannoceratopsis sp. A	Mrzygłód mine	Dinocysts	A Dinophyceae Dinoflagellatan, type member of the family Nannoceratopsiaceae. N. sp. A differs from all Nannoceratopsis, where they have antapical horns by the shape of cone cavity between these horns this has triangular shape created by two straight in near margins of the horns. The large amount of Cysts of the genus point to more diversified marine palaeoenvironments.	
Batiacasphaera	Batiacasphaera sp	Mrzygłód mine	Dinocysts	A Dinophyceae Dinoflagellatan, member of the family Gonyaulacales. A rather rare genus present on a few samples.	
Mendicodinium	Mendicodinium spinosum	Mrzygłód mine	Dinocysts	A Dinophyceae Dinoflagellatan, member of the family Gonyaulacales. A rather rare genus present on a few samples.	
Luehndea	Luehndea spinosa	Mrzygłód mine	Dinocysts	A Dinophyceae Dinoflagellatan, type member of the family Luehndeoideae. Presence of Luehndea spinosa suggests Late Pliensbachian–earliest Toarcian age of studied assemblages.	

=== Palynology ===
The Blanowice Beds are distributed in area between Częstochowa, Dębnik, Siewierz and Olkusz in the Silesian - Cracow Monocline. The coals were mined there in the years 1818–1959. The major plant bearing strata is exposed at Kierszuła near Poręba, where an identified spore-pollen assemblage comprises higher cryptogamic plants (Bryopsida, Selaginellopsida, Sphenopsida, Lycopsida, Pteropsida) and the gymnospermous (Pteridospermopsida, Cycadopsida, Bennettitales, Ginkgoaceae, Coniferopsida). The Pollen of coniferous plants has been seen as connected with the Cheirolepidiaceae group, on an assemblage of herbaceous peat-bog vegetation, characterized by predominance of ferns, was most probably the parent material for that variety of coals. The presence of fairly thick laminae of Vitrain in the Kierszuła middle layers indicates some phases with share of forest assemblage marked in area of contemporary peat-bog.

Genus	Species	Location	Material	Notes	Images
Sporopollenites	Sporopollenites circumdatus; Sporopollenites magnus	Częstochowa; Dębnik; Siewierz; Olkusz	Spores or Pollen	Uncertain assigantion Palynological remains, that resemble both Pollen and Megaspores, with non diagnosed affinities.	
Stereisporites	Stereisporites radiatus	Poreba area near Zawiercie	Spores	Affinities with Bryopsida inside Bryophyta. Moss Spores, rather rare and found on coals associated with fluvial debris.	
Rogalskaisporites	Rogalskaisporites cicatricosus	Częstochowa; Dębnik; Siewierz; Olkusz	Spores	Affinities with Sphagnopsida inside Sphagnales. Pollen nearly identical to that one found associated with the modern moss genus Sphagnum. Moss related to high humid environments.	
Leptolepidites	Leptolepidites maior	Poreba area near Zawiercie	Spores	Affinities with Lycopsida inside Lycophyta.	
Foveotriletes	Foveotriletes verrucosus	Poreba area near Zawiercie	Pollen	Affinities with Lycopsida inside Lycophyta.	
Uvaesporites	Uvaesporites argenteaeformis	Częstochowa; Dębnik; Siewierz; Olkusz	Pollen	Affinities with Selaginellaceae inside Lycopodiophyta. Spores that resemble that of Selaguinella-like herbaceous flora.	
Apiculatisporis	Apiculatisporis ovalis	Częstochowa; Dębnik; Siewierz; Olkusz	Pollen	Affinities with Selaginellaceae inside Lycopodiophyta. Pollen nearly identical to that one found associated with the modern moss genus Selaginella. Herbaceous Fern related to high humid environments.	
Densoisporites	Densoisporites velatus; Densoisporites microypsylon; Densoisporites rugosus	Poreba area near Zawiercie	Spores	Affinities with Selaginellaceae inside Lycopodiophyta. Herbaceous Fern related to high humid environments. The species Densoisporites rugosus can be a junior synonym of Densosporites solaris	
Punctatisporites	Punctatisporites adriennis	Poreba area near Zawiercie	Spores	Affinities with the genus Sphenophyllum and Rotularia marsileafolia inside Sphenophyllaceae. Punctatisporites is one of the largest genera of trilete spores, ranging from the Devonian to the Cretaceous. Herbaceous Equisetalean Flora, related with humid settings.	
Lophotriletes	Lophotriletes trichopunctatus	Poreba area near Zawiercie	Spores	Affinities with Filicopsida. Fern Spores of uncertain concrete assignation.	
Lygodiumsporites	Lygodiumsporites adriennis; Lygodiumsporites folliculosus; Lygodiumsporites lunaris	Częstochowa; Dębnik; Siewierz; Olkusz	Spores	Affinities with Lygodiaceae inside Schizaeales. Spores nearly identical to that one found associated with the modern moss genus Lygodium. Climbing ferns, that grew over trees and are Pyrofiles, fuel for peat fires, whose presence are widely recorded locally on the Blanowice Brown coals.	
Reticulatisporites	Reticulatisporites arcuatus; Reticulatisporites ornatus	Częstochowa; Dębnik; Siewierz; Olkusz	Spores	Affinities with Schizaeaceae inside Schizaeales. Herbaceous Ferns.	
Carnisporites	Carnisporites granulatus	Poreba area near Zawiercie	Spores	Affinities with the genus Cynepteris inside Cynepteridaceae. Floor Ferns related to high humid environments.	
Todisporites	Todisporites hartzi	Częstochowa; Dębnik; Siewierz; Olkusz	Pollen	Affinities with Osmundaceae inside Pteridophyta.	
Osmundacidites	Osmundacidites wellmanii	Częstochowa; Dębnik; Siewierz; Olkusz	Spores	Affinities with Osmundaceae inside Pteridophyta. Spores nearly identical to that one found associated with the modern fern genus Osmunda. Members of the genus Osmunda have been found on coeval age strata on Sweden.	
Marattiopsis	Marattiopsis hoerensis	Poreba area near Zawiercie	Spores	Affinities with Marattiaceae inside Marattiales. spores nearly identical to that one found associated with the fern leaf genus Marattiopsis	
Marattisporites	Marattisporites scabratus	Poreba area near Zawiercie	Spores	Affinities with Marattiaceae inside Marattiales.	
Concavisporites	Concavisporites toralis	Częstochowa; Dębnik; Siewierz; Olkusz	Spores	Affinities with Dipteridaceae inside Gleicheniales. Spores nearly identical to that one found associated with the fern leaf genus Clathropteris	
Cyathidites	Cyathidites minor	Częstochowa; Dębnik; Siewierz; Olkusz	Spores	Affinities with Cyatheaceae inside Cyatheales. Cyathidites minor almost certainly belong to well known Mesozoic species Coniopteris hymenophylloides and to other fossil cyatheaceous or dicksoniaceous ferns such as Eboracia lobifolia and Dicksonia mariopteri.	
Chasmatosporites	Chasmatosporites apertus	Częstochowa; Dębnik; Siewierz; Olkusz	Pollen	Affinities with the family Cycadaceae inside Cycadales. Is among the most abundant flora recovered on the upper section of the coeval Rya Formation, and was found to be similar to the pollen of the extant Encephalartos laevifolius.	
Bennettistemon	Bennettistemon bursigerum	Częstochowa; Dębnik; Siewierz; Olkusz	Spores	Affinities with Bennettitales inside Bennettitopsida. Bennetitalean Spores, coming from hebaceous to arbustive plants.	
Pityosporites	Pityosporites haploxylon; Pityosporites minimus	Częstochowa; Dębnik; Siewierz; Olkusz	Pollen	Affinities with Pinaceae inside Coniferae. Resemble modern Pinus Pollen, probably belonging to a similar Genus.	
Quadraeculina	Quadraeculina anellaeformis	Częstochowa; Dębnik; Siewierz; Olkusz	Pollen	Affinities with Pinaceae inside Coniferae. Pollen From arbustive to arboreal plants, resembling the pollen of the modern genus Picea	
Inaperturapollenites	Inaperturapollenites magnus	Częstochowa; Dębnik; Siewierz; Olkusz	Pollen	Affinities with Abietoideae inside Coniferae. Diploxylonoid bisaccate pollen grains of Coniferales affinity	
Cerebropollenites	Cerebropollenites macroverrucosus; Cerebropollenites serratus	Częstochowa; Dębnik; Siewierz; Olkusz	Pollen	Affinities with both Sciadopityaceae and Miroviaceae inside Pinopsida. This Pollen resemblance with extant Sciadopitys suggest that Miroviaceae can be an extinct lineage of sciadopityaceaous-like plants.	
Podocarpeaepollenites	Podocarpeaepollenites trialatus	Częstochowa; Dębnik; Siewierz; Olkusz	Pollen	Affinities with Podocarpaceae inside Pinopsida. Pollen From arbustive to arboreal plants	
Pristinuspollenites	Pristinuspollenites sulcatus	Częstochowa; Dębnik; Siewierz; Olkusz	Pollen	Affinities with Podocarpaceae inside Pinopsida. Pollen From arbustive to arboreal plants. Resembles the Pollen of the modern genus Prumnopitys.	
Pseudopodocarpus	Pseudopodocarpus sp.	Częstochowa; Dębnik; Siewierz; Olkusz	Pollen	Affinities with Podocarpaceae inside Pinopsida. Pollen From arbustive to arboreal plants	
Classopollis	Classopollis torosus; Classopollis classoides	Częstochowa; Dębnik; Siewierz; Olkusz	Pollen	Affinities with Cheirolepidiaceae inside Pinopsida. Cheirolepidaceae Pollen represents the 56 to 60% of the Palynology of the Formation.	
Araucariacites	Araucariacites australis	Częstochowa; Dębnik; Siewierz; Olkusz	Pollen	Affinities with Araucariaceae inside Pinopsida. Pollen From arbustive to arboreal plants	

=== Fossil Wood ===
The Blanowice Coals fossil wood from Zawiercie area were already described in 1917 as "Blanowicer Keuperholz", on the basis of specimens from the "Elka", "Kamilla" and "Zygmunt" coal pits, claimed to be xylologically similar, yet no taxon was named and the collection was not preserved. Based on recent revisions of the local flora, likely belong to Agathoxylon.

Genus	Species	Location	Material	Notes	Images
Agathoxylon	Agathoxylon sp.	"Elka" coal pit; "Kamilla" coal pit; "Zygmunt" coal pit	Isolated Logs; Isolated Branches; Isolated Indeterminate Woody Material; Coalified Fragments	Affinities with Hirmeriellaceae or Araucariaceae inside Pinales.	Agathoxylon

=== Plant Remains ===
Upper Pliensbachian strata on the Zawiercie area (Upper Silesia) is the main source for the Blanowice Formation Flora. Coal was mined locally during the 19th and early 20th centuries. Rutkowski (1923) found only three specimens of plants on waste heaps there, that where never properly described or illustrated, came from shale above the coal seam. Along with the Plant remains also noted plant detritus and coalified wood fragments. According to information from local miners, fossil plant specimens were discovered only rarely during coal extraction.

Genus	Species	Location	Material	Notes	Images
Phlebopteris	Phlebopteris elegans	Zawiercie area	Leaves	Affinities with Matoniaceae inside Gleicheniales. Leaves of medium-sized ferns, related to modern Matonia. This type of ferns are found on tropical-humid environments, where they form large-scale colonies with +1000 individuals. The genus Laccopteris was synonymized with Phlebopteris elegans.	Fossil Phlebopteris
Protorhipis	Protorhipis integrifolia	Zawiercie area; Siewierz area; Wysoka mine	Leaves	Affinities with Dipteridaceae inside Gleicheniales. Is a sister taxa to Hausmannia, with some works putting it inside the genus, representig 2 varieties, one with small reniform fronds and other with shallow dissected fronds (s.g. Hausmannia/Protorhipis). Has been suggested as a possible member of the Ginkoales, as some Leaves have resemblance with the genus Baiera. It was also identified as Laccopteris elegans. Ferns with Coriaceous leaves, related with modern genera found on Tropical climates.	
Sphenopteris	Sphenopteris sp.	Zawiercie area; Siewierz area; Wysoka mine	Leaves	Affinities with Lyginopteridaceae inside Pteridospermatophyta. A genus of leave related to the older Lyginopteris and Macroneuropteris. It belongs to medium to large arboreal fern-like plants.	Reconstruction of Sphenopteris
Leptostrobus	Leptostrobus longus	Poręba	Seed cones	Affinities with Czekanowskiales inside Ginkgoaceae. Reproductive organs related with Pollen, from Arboreal Plants Similar to modern Ginko. Leptostrobus is considered as a reproductive organ of Czekanowskia and assigned to Czekanowskiales because of the association of Leptostrobus and Czekanowskia in several localities and theagreement in their structures of basal scale leaves and cuticles.	

=== Fungi ===
Genus	Species	Location	Material	Notes	Images
Xylophagous Fungi	Morphotype A (Aseptae); Morphotype B (Sphaerical); Morphotype C (Sack-shaped); Morphotype D (Transverse septa)	Parkoszowice 58 BN Borehole	Fungal Spores; Hyphae-like attachments	Saprophyte fungal Spores from Marine and Deltaic Settings associated with wood and Litter. The frequency of fungal spores on the Polish basin on the Pliensbachian-Toarcian transition is correlated with negative C isotope peaks and enhanced cuticular plant litter accumulation, pointing to climate-driven enhanced decomposition of wood and rapid destruction of terrestrial carbon, which may have played an important role in the aggravation of the Jurassic Greenhouse disaster. Associated with a high rate of organic burial, the presence of Fungal Matter increased on the Uppermost layers of the Drzewica Formation, with a continue deposition between the T-OAE extincion, and several ups and downs on the Ciechocinek Formation, related with local climate and humidity changes. This is rather a reflection of the efficiency of terrestrial biodegradation. Measured increasing of temperature favoured local fungal-mediated decomposition of plant litter, specifically of normally resistant wood. Observed fungal spores represent various morphotypes and resemble superficially other palynogenic detritus, such as sphaerical Prasinophyceae. In some cases sphaerical fungal spores show structures related to Hyphae attachments.	Spores found on the Polish are mostly from Saprophyte (wood decomposers) fungi, resembling the extant genera like Scutellinia, which are probably the main origin for the Fungal Spores found on the Ciechocinek Formation
Amerospores	Morphotype E (Amerospore)	Parkoszowice 58 BN Borehole	Fungal Spores	A Saprophyte fungus, member of the family Sordariomycetes inside Ascomycota. Non-filamentous spores with no septations and with no projections longer than the spore body. Related with the extant genus Poronia. Fungal spore peaks linked to a relative and absolute loss of wood suggest a prominent role of fungal wood decomposers.	Poronia punctata, an extant saprophyte fungus with Amerospores. Similar fungi probably liberated this spores on the Ciechocinek Formation
Phragmospores	Morphotype F (Phragmospores)	Parkoszowice 58 BN Borehole	Fungal Spores	A Saprophyte fungus, member of the family Dothideomycetes or Sordariomycetes inside Ascomycota. Spores with two or more transverse septa . Related with the extant genus Acanthostigma, facultative pathogen, or beneficial partner of many plant species. Local humidity, though sufficiently high for fungal development throughout the whole T-OAE interval, is therefore thought to have been of a lesser significance for dynamics of fungal decomposition than elevated temperature.	
Dictyosporiaceae	Morphotype G (Dictyospores)	Parkoszowice 58 BN Borehole	Fungal Spores	A freshwater anamorphic fungus, member of the family Pleosporales inside Pleosporomycetidae. Multicellular spore with septations that intersect in more than one plane. Are characterized by being mostly aquatic lignicolous species with cheiroid, digitate, palmate and/or dictyosporous conidia. Related with the extant genus Dictyosporium, recorded worldwide from dead wood, decaying leaves, and palm material.	
Sporonites	Sporonites neddenii	Parkoszowice borehole; Blanowice Coals	Fungal Spores	A True Fungus, member of the family Eumycota inside Eumycetes. It is found associated with Wood Cuticles, Pollen and Spores, interpreted as some sort of parasitism. This genus is found mostly associated with the Blanowice Brown Coals, specially on associated Boreholes.	Sporonites was probably related with plant parasite fungus or a litter fungus, such as Dicranophora

=== Ichnofossils ===
Genus	Species	Location	Material	Type	Abundance	Notes	Images
Lockeia	Lockeia siliquaria; Lockeia amygdaloides; Lockeia czarnockii	Parkoszowice 58 BN borehole; Nowa Wieś 12 borehole; Suliszowice 38 BN borehole; Żarki 89 Ż borehole; Jaworznik 132 Ż borehole; Włodowice 52 BN	Dwelling traces	Cubichnia; Domichnia	Very Abundant	Marine Brackish or Freswather resting traces of Bivalves. The Lockeia traces trend to accumulate on Brackish waters on the case of the Drzewica Formation. They can occur in large aggregates, where occasionally traces present on agglomerations show a clear orientation, probably parallel to the palaeocurrent direction, which is associated with locomotion of the burrowing animal.	
Scalichnus	Scalichnus phiale	Suliszowice 38 BN borehole; Żarki 89 Ż borehole; Jaworznik 132 Ż borehole	Sac/Bottle shaped burrows	Fugichnia; Domichnia	Common	Marine Brackish or Freswather tubular traces of annelids, acuatic insect larvae or Crustaceans	
Isopodichnus	Isopodichnus isp.	Suliszowice 38 BN borehole	Traces	Fodichnia	Common	Brackish or Freshwater trace fossils. Locomotion and feeding trace of phyllopod and notostracan crustaceans in nonmarine environments. It represents traces with great similarity of palaeoecology, population size-frequency, morphology and behaviour of Triops cancriformis	
Diplocraterion	Diplocraterion parallelum	Parkoszowice 58 BN borehole; Nowa Wieś 12 borehole; Suliszowice 38 BN borehole; Żarki 89 Ż borehole; Jaworznik 132 Ż borehole; Włodowice 52 BN	U-Shaped Burrows	Fodichnia	Common	Marine trace fossils. Is often associated with successions characterised by changes of sea level. Linked with Crustaceans, specially shrimps	

=== Annelida ===
Genus	Species	Location	Material	Notes	Images
Dictyothylakos	Dictyothylakos pesslerae; Dictyothylakos sp.	Parkoszowice 58 BN borehole; Bolesławiec 6 borehole	Cocoons	Freshwater Clitellata Cocoons, identified with palynological residues. The cocoons Dictyothylakos are common on flooded basin sediments, and implies not only the presence of parasitic leeches, but also the presence of large hosts nearby. The Alluvial deposits of the Blanowice formation recover the best local place for Leech cocoons, as proven by the major concentration of specimens found on the lower Jurassic Polish Basin.	Example of Leech Cocoon

=== Bivalvia ===
Genus	Species	Location	Material	Notes	Images
Cardinia	Cardinia philea	Parkoszowice 58 BN borehole	Cunchs	A bivalve clam, Type genus of the family Cardiniidae inside Carditida. On the Pliensbachian strata there isn't a clear consensus if the Polish Basin reached stenohaline conditions, but the presence of this genus on the Parkoszowice 58 BN borehole along with foramiferans and marine phytoplankton tends to support more polyhaline-mesohaline conditions.	
Palaeunio	Palaeunio minutus; Palaeunio franconica	Choroń 31-BN Borehole; Bolesławiec 6 borehole	Cunchs	A Freshwater Mussel, type member of the family Unionoida inside Palaeoheterodonta. The Only major Freshwater Bivalve recovered on the Formation.	Example of extant specimen of Unio
