= Piotr Steinkeller =

Polish entrepreneur

Piotr Antoni Steinkeller
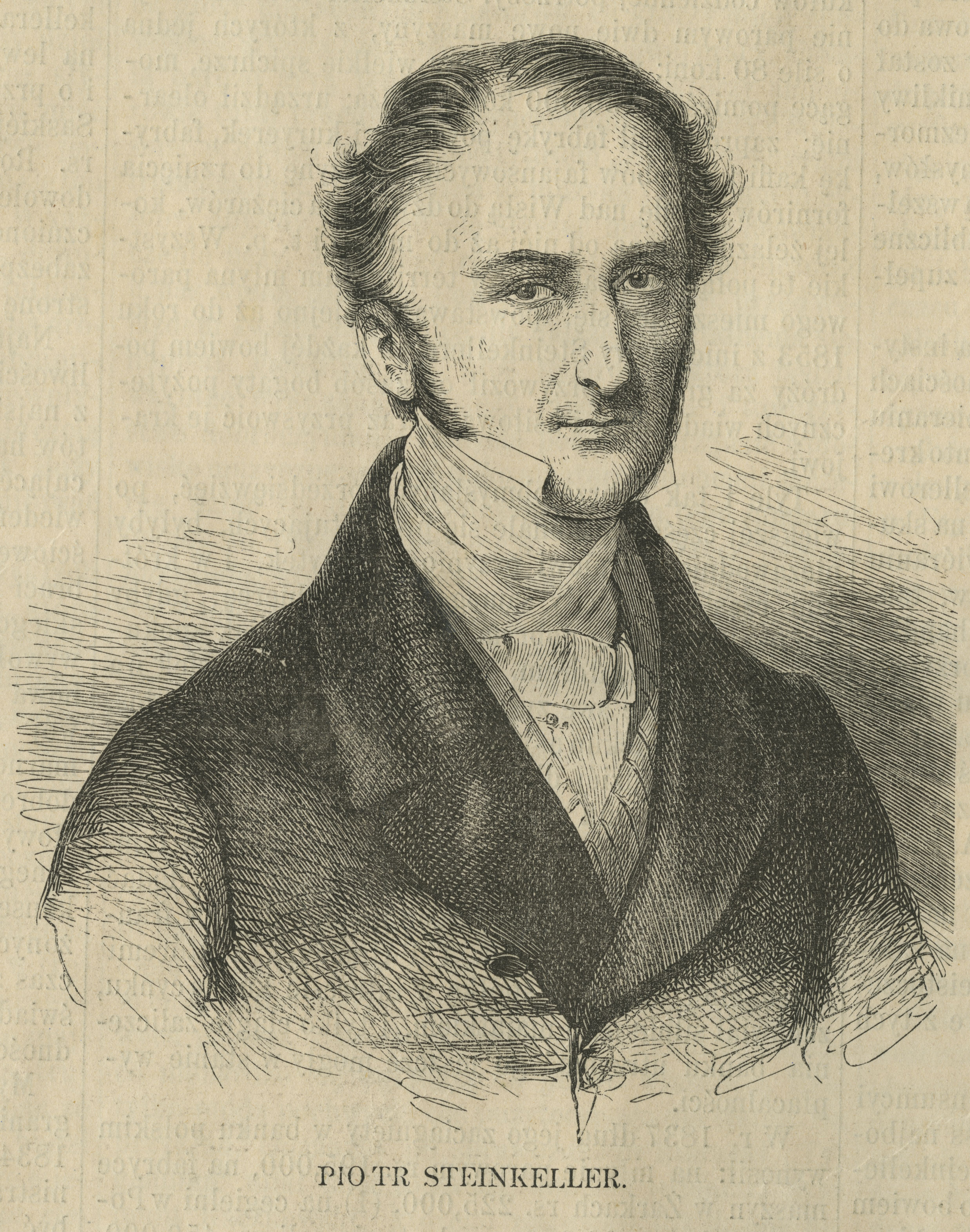
- Piotr Antoni Steinkeller, industrialist
- Born: 15 February 1799; Kraków
- Died: 11 February 1854 (aged 54); Kraków
- Resting place: Rakowicki Cemetery, Kraków
- Occupation(s): Industrialist, banker
- Known for: Zinc Processing, mining, international trade, banking, courier service, worker rights
- Spouses: Aniela Anthonin; Maria Lemańska
- Children: Józef, Alfred, Alexander, Edward and Paulina; Henryk Artur
- Parent(s): Piotr Steinkeller; Józefina Frey
- Relatives: Jozef Hauke-Bosak
- Awards: Order of St Anna; Order of St Stanislaus

Piotr Antoni Steinkeller (German: Peter Steinkeller); 15 February 1799 – 11 February 1854) was a German-Polish entrepreneur, banker and pioneering industrialist. He was known as the "King of Zinc" and opened the London Zinc Works in Hoxton in 1837.

== Life ==
Of German origin, he was the son of Józefina (née Frey) and Piotr Steinkeller, descended from Pomeranian nobility. The family being Roman Catholic, they migrated to the Tyrol at the time of the Reformation, and later moved to Vienna. In mid 18th century, Steinkeller's grandfather arrived in Kraków to open a wholesale business in spices. The family business carried on into the next generation, headed by the following Piotr, who died prematurely in 1813, leaving a widow with 5 children. At that stage Piotr Antoni was sent to Vienna to study international trade and to do an internship in banking. He returned to Kraków in 1818 and took over the management of the family business.

From the start he evinced great energy and inventiveness. He proceeded to make local investments in Kraków Free State. In 1822 he bought a mining concession near Jaworzno, where he built a coal mine and a zinc smelting factory that he named "Józefina" after his mother. It became the scene of his broad range of economic interests as he proved himself a pioneer in the industrial field. He made contracts for an uninterrupted supply of raw materials from the open-cast zinc mine in Długoszyn and leased further zinc ore deposits in Byczyna. He established a state-of-the-art Zinc production-line that employed around 80 people. He was a social innovator in relation to his work-force: he brought in signed work contracts outlining the rights and obligations of both parties and provided accommodation for the workers. For that purpose he erected an estate for his employees – this became the foundation of today's Niedzieliska district. He also initiated a scheme to build a miners' hospital in Jaworzno and equipped the first industrial Fire service in the area.

== Expansion in Warsaw ==
In 1825 Steinkeller resolved to sell the Niedzieliski business and move to Warsaw, where he settled permanently. There he continued his pioneering economic involvement in several fields. He opened a large Department store, imported salt from England, invested in mining and Steel production in Dąbrowa Górnicza, where exploration of deep mining had just begun at Zagłębie Dąbrowskie. He established a Brickworks in Pomiechówek and bought a steam-driven mill in Solec in Warsaw. He expanded his zinc interests into large-scale production by leasing government owned tin mines and smelting facilities in Congress Poland. He also imported zinc from the Kraków area, controlled then by Habsburg Austria. Whereas in London he set up a zinc works to produce galvanised sheeting and from there he developed an international trade in the metal.

In 1838 he set up a Courier service whose network covered virtually all the main tracts in the Russian-controlled Kingdom of Poland and outlying areas, using specialist courier carriages he produced at his Solec depot, known as „steinkellerki" – Steinkeller's Diligence”. He supplemented these with a river courier service. Until the opening of the Warsaw–Vienna railway of which he was one of the early backers and investors, his messenger network was the chief source of his revenues.

Thanks to his efforts, on Nowy Świat Street, the main commercial thoroughfare in Warsaw, the road was laid out in timber blocks. He acquired a vast country estate near Częstochowa, in an area known as dominium żareckie or "Żarki domain", including the town of Żarki, and villages like: Jaroszów, Zawada, Leśniów, Przewodziszowice, Jaworznik, Ciszówka, Myszków, Nowa Wieś and Warcianna. There he brought in modern agricultural techniques in raising crops and animal husbandry. He also opened a factory to produce agricultural machinery.

He was also an active investor and financier. Among his roles were consultant to Bank Polski, where he worked closely with Henryk Łubieński, and was a senior consultant to the Warsaw Stock Exchange. The registered office of his business was in the Mniszchów Palace in Warsaw, that had been refurbished for the Warsaw Chamber of commerce (Warszawska Resursa Kupiecka), of which Steinkeller was an active member.

However, not all of Steinkeller's initiatives were crowned with success. This was due largely to problems of a technical nature. Faith in foreign specialists was sometimes misplaced. Examples of this were his over-reliance on them in the restoration of lead mines in Olkusz, or in the production of Farm equipment, or importing river barges from England whose draught was inappropriate for Polish waterways. His own financial situation took a turn for the worse towards the end of the 1840s. His indebtedness to Bank Polski, a new management (Łubieński and president Lubowidzki had been removed on charges of malfeasance) at the bank and a fire at his Solec works led to his being declared bankrupt in 1849. All his assets in Congress Poland were taken over by Bank Polski. He returned "over the border" to Kraków, where he still owned assets like his brickworks and a roof-tile factory in Podgórze. Not long after he died of a cardiac arrest.

== Personal life ==
Steinkeller was twice married: firstly, to Aniela Anthonin, and secondly to Maria Lemańska. From his first marriage there were four sons and a daughter, Józef, Alfred, Aleksander, Edward and Paulina. There was one son from the second marriage, Henryk Artur. Steinkeller's nephew by his sister, was Józef Hauke-Bosak.

== Honours ==
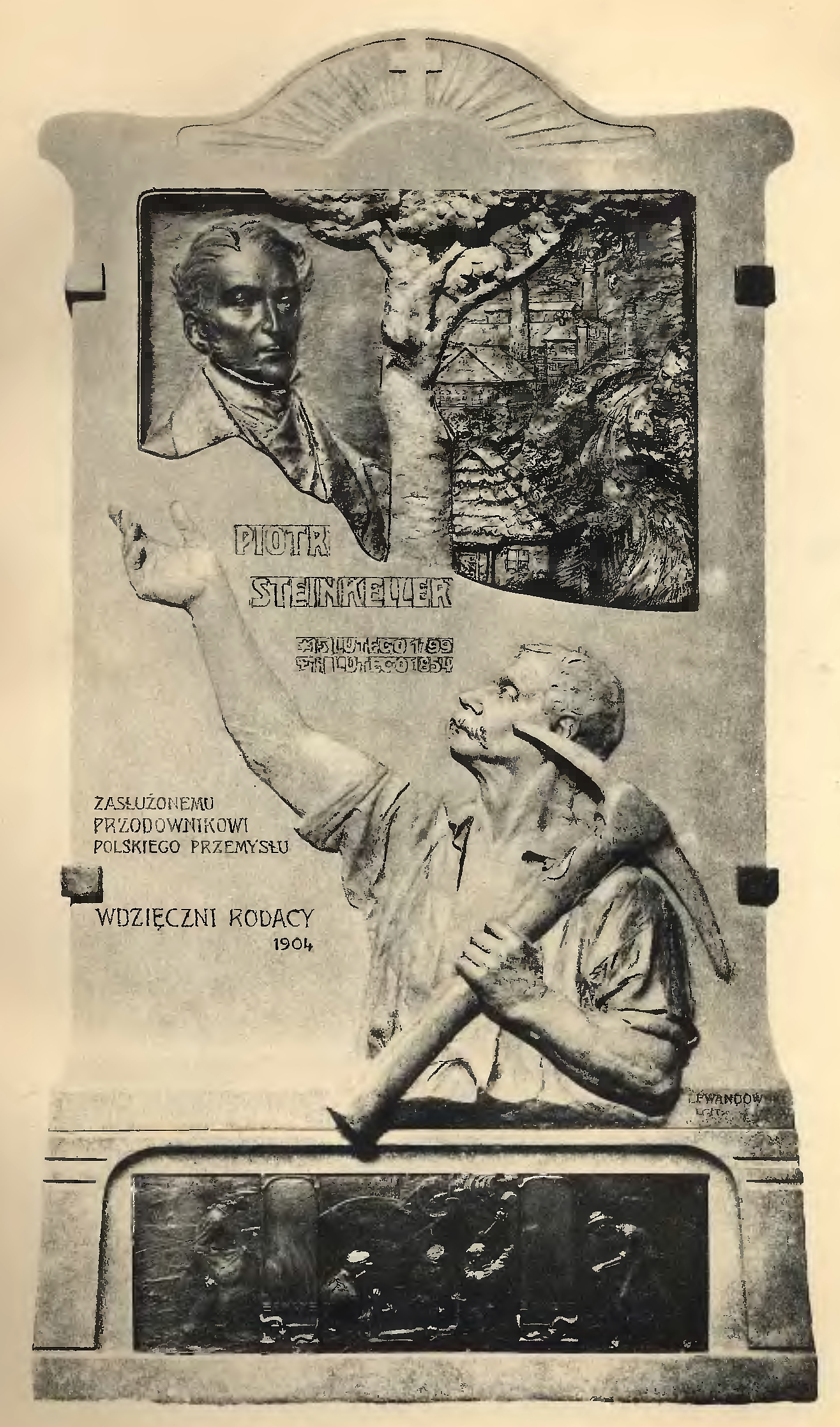
Commemorative plaque to Steinkeller in St Peter and Paul church, Warsaw

Among his contemporaries he was greatly admired and carried great authority. His appeal to colleagues can be summed up as follows: "aside from his astonishing energy and his enormous zest for industry, he had a solid and honest respect for industry itself, not as a pretext for speculation, not as an asset stripper, but looking out for organic growth for the benefit of the country as a whole." He was awarded;

- The Order of Saint Stanislaus III class 1839
- The Order of St. Anna III class 1842

On the 50th anniversary of his death in 1904 a commemorative plaque to Steinkeller was placed in St Peter and Paul church, Warsaw with the inscription: To a deserving Polish industrial pioneer, from his grateful countrymen.

== Bibliography ==
- Archiwum Państwowe w Krakowie, Zespół Wolnego Miasta Krakowa – Akta senatu, wydziału dochodów publicznych, akta górnicze.
- Piotr Steinkeller, w: Polski Słownik Biograficzny, t. XLIII/3, s. 336–342.
- Ryszard Kołodziejczyk, Piotr Steinkeller kupiec i przemysłowiec 1799–1854, Warszawa, 1963.
- Ryszard Kołodziejczyk, Bohaterowie nieromantyczni, Warszawa, 1961.
- Maria Leś-Runicka, Piotr Steinkeller – założyciel osiedla Niedzieliska, „Zeszyty historyczne miasta Jaworzna”, grudzień 1999 nr 1/1, s. 21–23.
- Henryk Radziszewski, Jan Kindelski, Piotr Steinkeller – dwie monografie, Warszawa, 1905. wersja elektroniczna
- Stanisław Dziewulski, P.A. Steinkeller w 50-tą rocznicę śmierci, „Ekonomista”, 1904, s. 104 i nast.
- Andrzej Kuśnierczyk, Bankructwo Steinkellera, w: „Korzenie”, nr 53.
- L. Jenike, Piotr Steinkeller, „Tygodnik Ilustrowany”, 1859, nr 7 (wersja elektroniczna).
- Piotr Hapanowicz, Pierwszy oligarcha. Piotr Antoni Steinkeller (1799–1854), „Kraków”, 2008, nr 2-3 (wersja elektroniczna).
