= Fornalczyk =

Fornalczyk is a Polish surname. Notable people with the surname include:

- Bogusław Fornalczyk (1937–2025), Polish cyclist
- Mariusz Fornalczyk (born 2003), Polish footballer
