= Jaroszów =

Jaroszów may refer to the following places in Poland:

- Jaroszów, Lower Silesian Voivodeship (south-west Poland)
- Jaroszów, Silesian Voivodeship (south Poland)
