= Ostrów, Myszków County =

Ostrów
- Village
- Location within Poland
- Coordinates: 50°38′54″N 19°16′58″E
- Country: Poland
- Voivodeship: Silesian
- County: Myszków
- Gmina: Żarki
- Population: 270

Ostrów [ˈɔstruf] is a village in the administrative district of Gmina Żarki, within Myszków County, Silesian Voivodeship, in southern Poland.
