= Zawada, Myszków County =

Zawada
- Village
- Location within Poland
- Coordinates: 50°39′20″N 19°22′20″E
- Country: Poland
- Voivodeship: Silesian
- County: Myszków
- Gmina: Żarki

Zawada [zaˈvada] is a village in the administrative district of Gmina Żarki, within Myszków County, Silesian Voivodeship, in southern Poland.
