= Wysoka Lelowska =

- Village
- Location within Poland
- Coordinates: 50°38′N 19°20′E
- Country: Poland
- Voivodeship: Silesian
- County: Myszków
- Gmina: Żarki

Wysoka Lelowska [vɨˈsɔka lɛˈlɔfska] is a village in the administrative district of Gmina Żarki, within Myszków County, Silesian Voivodeship, in southern Poland.
