= Przybynów =

- Village
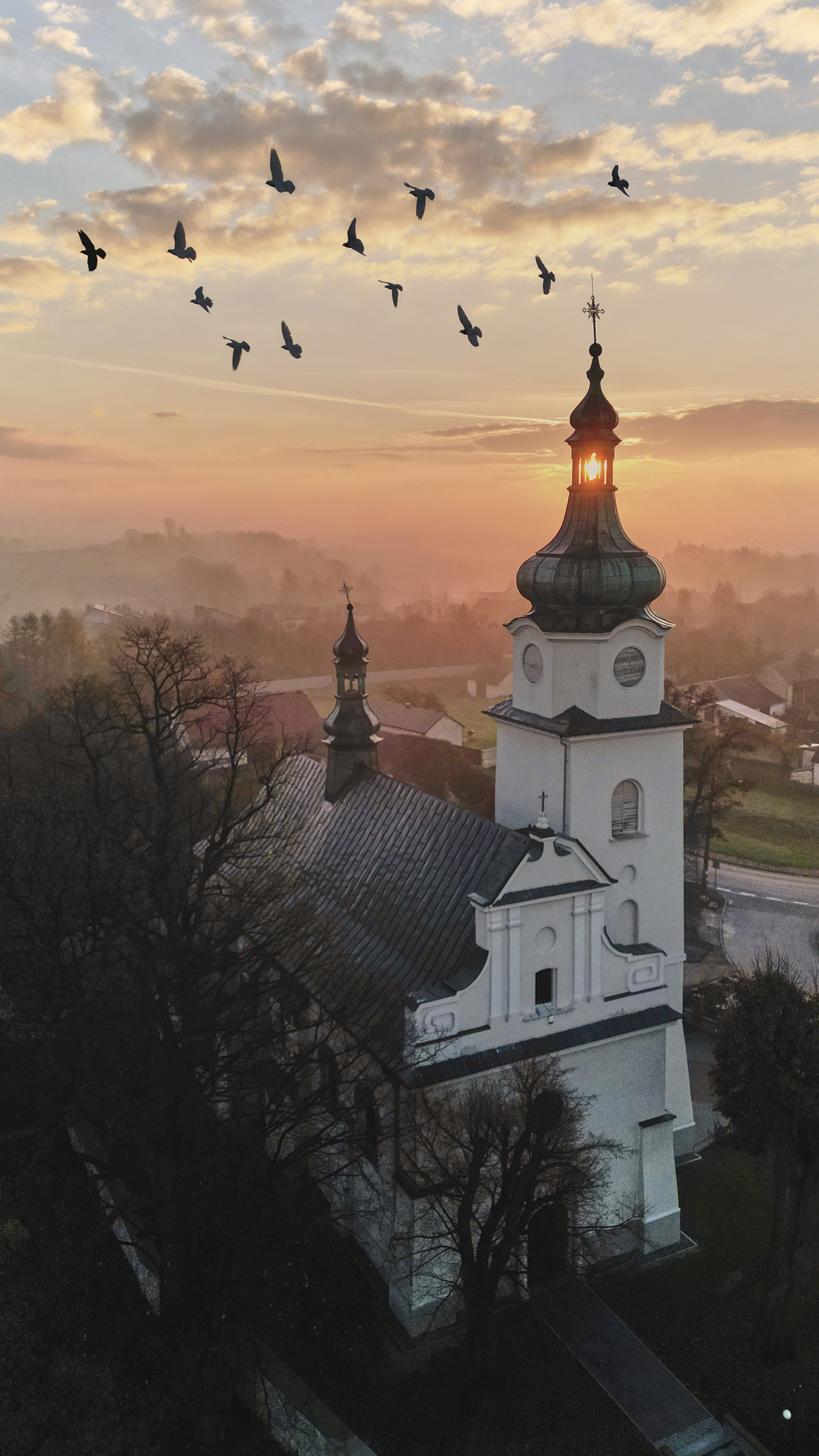
- Catholic church

- Location within Poland
- Coordinates: 50°39′N 19°20′E
- Country: Poland
- Voivodeship: Silesian
- County: Myszków
- Gmina: Żarki

Przybynów [pʂɨˈbɨnuf] is a village in the administrative district of Gmina Żarki, within Myszków County, Silesian Voivodeship, in southern Poland.
