= Czatachowa =

- Village
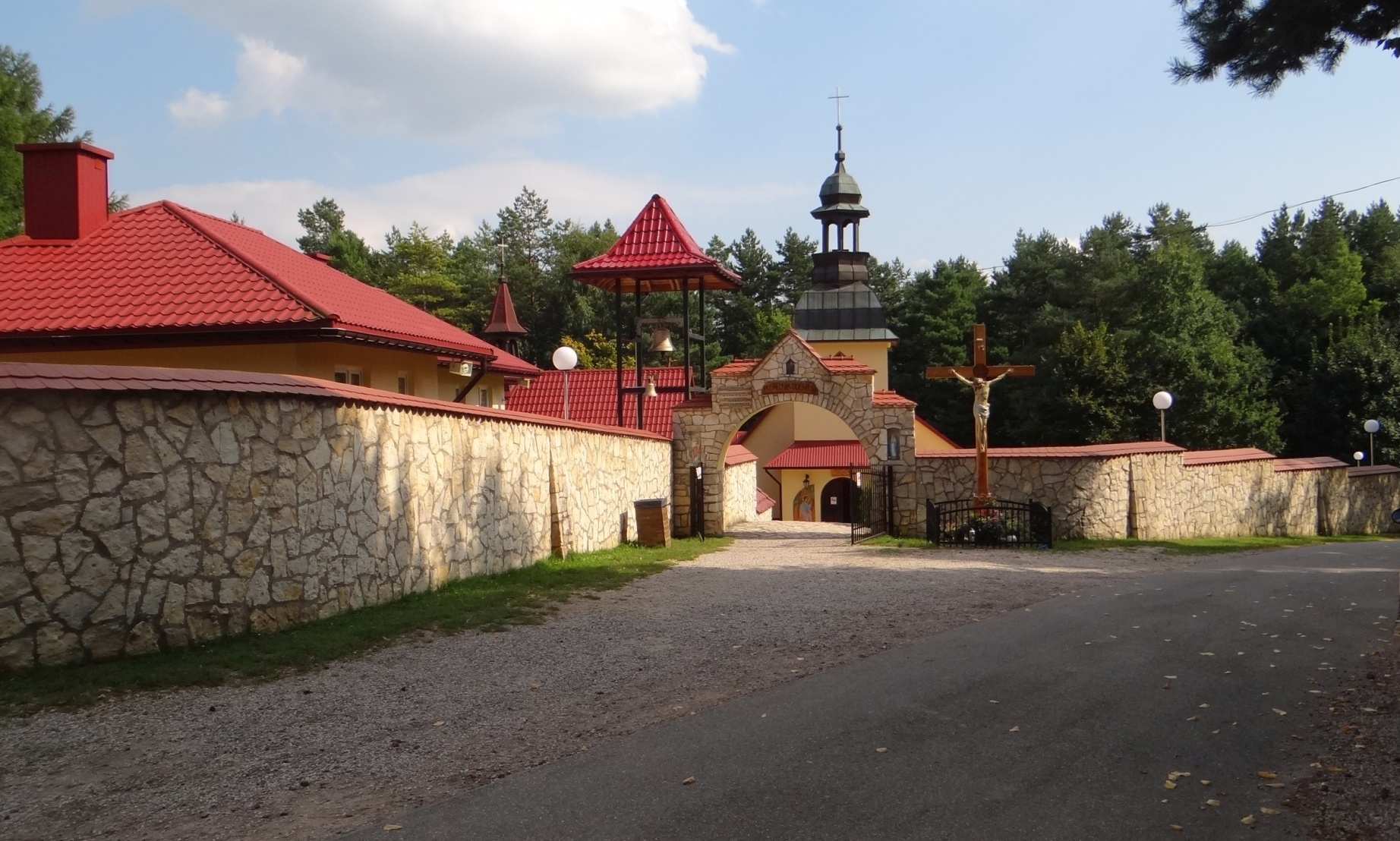

- Location within Poland
- Coordinates: 50°40′N 19°24′E
- Country: Poland
- Voivodeship: Silesian
- County: Myszków
- Gmina: Żarki

Czatachowa [t͡ʂataˈxɔva] is a village in the administrative district of Gmina Żarki, within Myszków County, Silesian Voivodeship, in southern Poland.
