= Kotowice, Silesian Voivodeship =

Kotowice
- Village
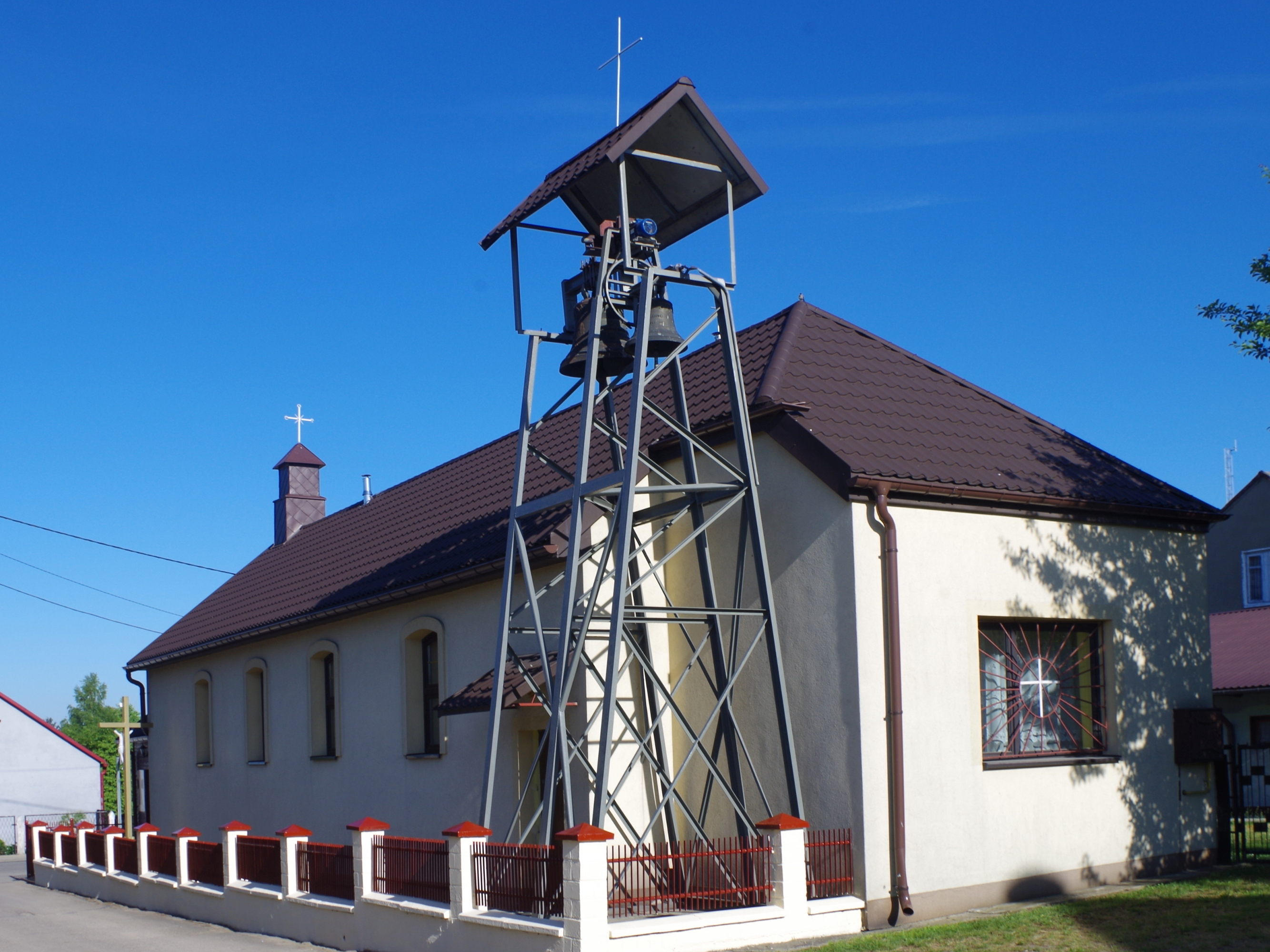
- Catholic church

- Location within Poland
- Coordinates: 50°35′44″N 19°27′11″E
- Country: Poland
- Voivodeship: Silesian
- County: Myszków
- Gmina: Żarki

Kotowice [kɔtɔˈvit͡sɛ] is a village in the administrative district of Gmina Żarki, within Myszków County, Silesian Voivodeship, in southern Poland.
