= Prażonki =

Cuisine in Poland

Pieczonki
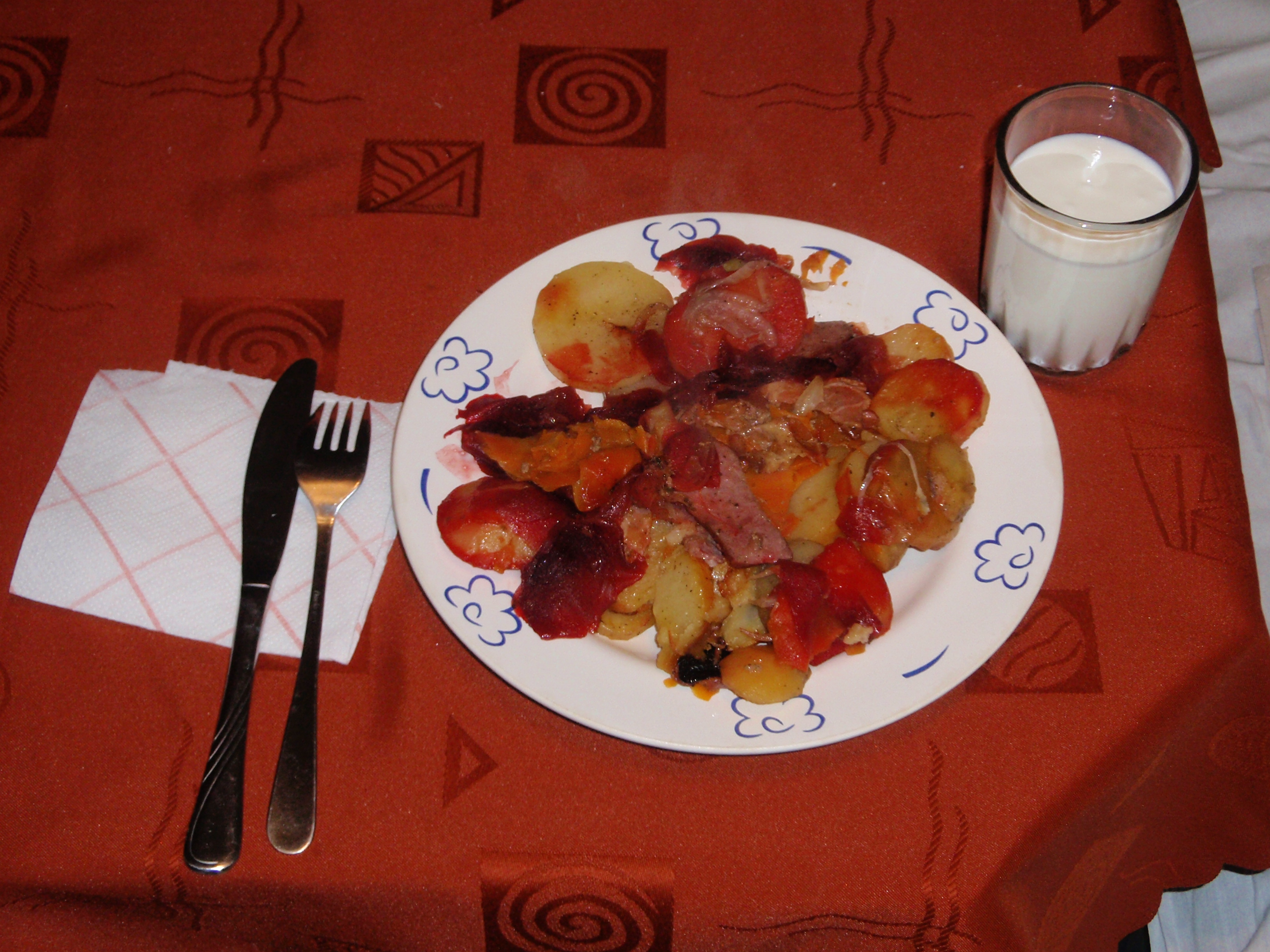
- Zagłębie Prażonki
- Alternative names: pieczonki, duszonki
- Course: Main
- Place of origin: Poland
- Serving temperature: Hot
- Main ingredients: Potato, lard, onion, kiełbasa

'Prażonki (also known as pieczonki or duszonki) is a dish traditionally originating from Poręba, a small town near Myszków and Zawiercie. In Poręba, Silesian Voivodeship, the locals host an annual "Światowy Festiwal Prażonek" (Worldwide Prażonki Festival). Prażonki are prepared from sliced or diced potatoes, braised with lard, onions, kiełbasa or alternatively with beets and carrots, covered with a leaf of cabbage. To continue, the ingredients are then tightly sealed in a special screwed container. Served with kefir and mizeria.

The dish is also known as pieczonki, duszonki, duszaki, maścipula, dymfoki and prażuchy. The dymfoki variation is cooked from potatoes, kiełbasa, bacon and white cabbage with the addition of pepper and salt. Traditionally, prażonki are prepared in a cast-iron cauldron, over an open fire - as the dish is prepared in Poręba (where original cast-iron cauldrons are still produced), Myszków and Zawiercie. Aluminum cauldrons are also produced. Prażonki can also be cooked in a pot or frying pan.

== See also ==
- Polish cuisine
- List of Polish dishes
