= Gmina Żarki =

Gmina Żarki Żarki Commune
- Gmina
- Coat of arms
- Interactive map of Gmina Żarki
- Coordinates (Żarki): 50°37′41″N 19°22′13″E
- Country: Poland
- Voivodeship: Silesian
- County: Myszków
- Seat: Żarki

Area
  - Total: 100.67 km^{2} (38.87 sq mi)

Population (2019-06-30)
  - Total: 8,446
  - Density: 83.90/km^{2} (217.3/sq mi)
  - Urban: 4,556
  - Rural: 3,890
- Website: https://www.umigzarki.pl

Gmina Żarki is an urban-rural gmina (administrative district) in Myszków County, Silesian Voivodeship, in southern Poland. Its seat is the town of Żarki, which lies approximately 7 kilometres (4 mi) north-east of Myszków and 50 km (31 mi) north-east of the regional capital Katowice.

The gmina covers an area of 100.67 square kilometres (38.9 sq mi), and as of 2019 its total population is 8,446.

== Villages ==
Apart from the town of Żarki, Gmina Żarki contains the villages and settlements of Czatachowa, Jaroszów, Jaworznik, Kotowice, Masłoniowizna, Ostrów, Przybynów, Skrobaczowizna, Suliszowice, Wysoka Lelowska, Zaborze and Zawada.

== Neighbouring gminas ==
Gmina Żarki is bordered by the town of Myszków and by the gminas of Janów, Niegowa, Olsztyn, Poraj and Włodowice.
