= Skrobaczowizna =

- Village
- Location within Poland
- Coordinates: 50°40′42″N 19°17′27″E
- Country: Poland
- Voivodeship: Silesian
- County: Myszków
- Gmina: Żarki

Skrobaczowizna [skrɔbat͡ʂɔˈvizna] is a village in the administrative district of Gmina Żarki, within Myszków County, Silesian Voivodeship, in southern Poland.
