= Parkoszowice, Lesser Poland Voivodeship =

Parkoszowice
- Village
- Location within Poland
- Coordinates: 50°19′7″N 20°3′28″E
- Country: Poland
- Voivodeship: Lesser Poland
- County: Miechów
- Gmina: Miechów
- Population: 210

Parkoszowice [parkɔʂɔˈvit͡sɛ] is a village in the administrative district of Gmina Miechów, within Miechów County, Lesser Poland Voivodeship, in southern Poland.
