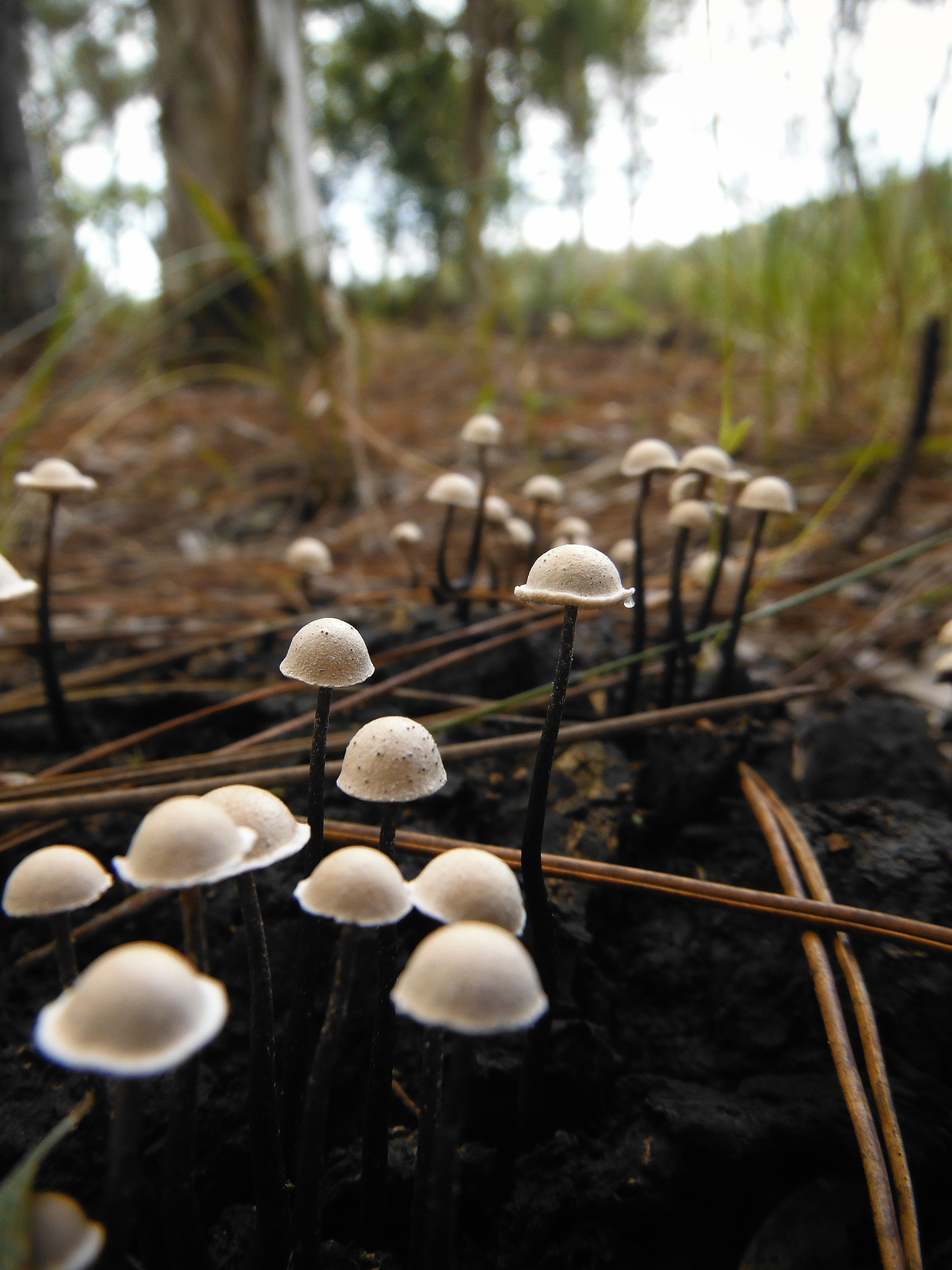
- Poronia pileiformis growing on cow dung

Scientific classification
- Domain: Eukaryota
- Kingdom: Fungi
- Division: Ascomycota
- Class: Sordariomycetes
- Order: Xylariales
- Family: Xylariaceae
- Genus: Poronia; Willd. (1787)

Type species
- Poronia gleditschii Willd. (1787)

= Poronia =

Genus of fungi

Poronia is a genus of fungi in the family Xylariaceae. The genus was circumscribed by Karl Ludwig Willdenow in 1787.

== Species ==
- Poronia australiensis
- Poronia ehrenbergii
- Poronia erici
- Poronia gigantea
- Poronia gleditschii
- Poronia oedipus
- Poronia pileiformis
- Poronia punctata
