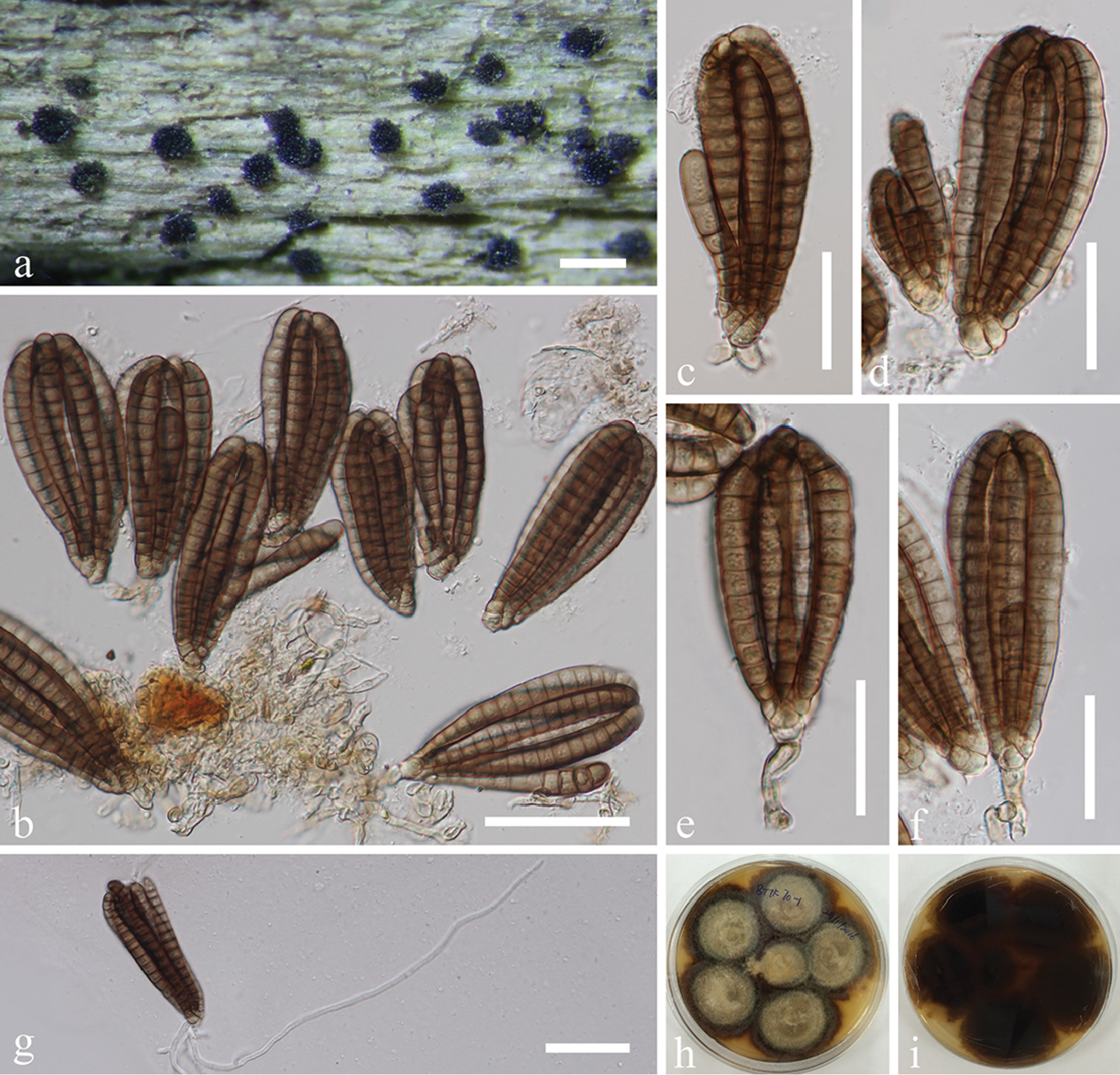
- Dictyocheirospora bannica: a Colonies on submerged wood. b Conidia and conidiophores. c–f Conidia. g Germinated conidium. h, i Culture, h from above, i from reverse. Scale bars: a=200 μm, b, g=50 μm, c–f=30 μm

Scientific classification
- Kingdom: Fungi
- Division: Ascomycota
- Class: Dothideomycetes
- Order: Pleosporales
- Family: Dictyosporiaceae
- Genus: Dictyosporium; Corda (1836)

Type species
- Dictyosporium elegans Corda (1836)

Species
- See text

Synonyms
- Botryosporium Schwein. (1832); Synphragmidium F.Strauss (1853)

= Dictyosporium =

Genus of fungi

Dictyosporium is the type genus of fungi belonging to the family Dictyosporiaceae. By an estimate in 2018 it is formed by 45 species.

The species in this genus are saprobic on dead or decaying wood and can be found on dead wood and plant litter in both terrestrial and aquatic habitats. The genus can be found worldwide, it has a cosmopolitan distribution. The type species is Dictyosporium elegans, which was described by August Carl Joseph Corda in Witenweber (1836).

== Family taxonomy ==
=== Dictyosporiaceae ===
The family of this genus, Dictyosporiaceae, was created to accommodate a holomorphic group of Dothideomycetes, including 12 genera that are saprobes on decaying wood and plant debris in terrestrial and freshwater habitats. The latest genera to be included were Dictyocheirospora, Dictyopalmispora, Jalapriya and Vikalpa.

=== Dictyosporium ===
The genus was analysed molecularly and was previously situated phylogenetically inside the Massariinaceae family. But in 2015 Tanka et al. changed its position and situated the genus inside the current family Dictyosporiaceae.

Dictyosporium is a paraphyletic genus and although since 2015 the family is correctly identified, the taxonomy of the genus is still unresolved and the number of species keeps changing.

==== Number of Species ====
In 2012 Withon et al. added 11 species while Boonmee et al. removed 10 species from the genus. The next change was in 2013 when three new species were identified: D. aquaticum, D. meiosporum and D. thailandicum. In 2015 D. araucariae, D. indicum, D. hydei, D. olivacesporum, D. pseudomusae, D. sexualis, D. splendidum and D. wuyiense were newly identified. By 2017 the genus had 43 species while in 2018 two new species were identified (D. tubulatum and D. tratense) and the genus was formed by 45 species.

== Morphological characteristics ==
The teleomorph is characterized by a dark brown, subglobose, superficial ascocarp. It has bitunicate, cylindrical asci. The ascospores are fusiform, hyaline, uniseptate with or without sheath.

The anamorph is characterized for producing sporodochial or effuse conidiomata. They produce branched colonies, cheroid, from pale brown to yellowish brown, smooth conidia with 4-7 parallel rows of cells. The conidiophores are inconspicuous.

Dictyosporium is a heterogenous paraphyletic assemblage of species and the characters of some can differ from the type species. The principal characteristic used to differentiate between species is the conidia size and the number of row cells.

The diagnostic features that separates Distyosporium from Massarinaceae are their conidia features.

== Species ==
As of March 2022, Species Fungorum accepts 60 species of Dictyosporium.

- Dictyosporium acroinflatum Whitton, K.D.Hyde & McKenzie (2012)
- Dictyosporium alatum Emden (1975)
- Dictyosporium amoenum C.R.Silva, Gusmão & R.F.Castañeda (2016)
- Dictyosporium appendiculatum Tibpromma & K.D.Hyde (2018)
- Dictyosporium aquaticum Abdel-Aziz (2015)
- Dictyosporium araucariae S.S.Silva, R.F.Castañeda & Gusmão (2015)
- Dictyosporium binatum (Sacc.) S.Hughes (1958)
- Dictyosporium biseriale D.M.Hu, L.Cai & K.D.Hyde (2010)
- Dictyosporium boydii A.L.Sm. & Ramsb. (1915)
- Dictyosporium brahmaswaroopii M.D.Mehrotra (1990)
- Dictyosporium bulbosum Tzean & J.L.Chen (1989)
- Dictyosporium campaniforme Matsush. (1975)
- Dictyosporium canisporum L.Cai & K.D.Hyde (2003)
- Dictyosporium castaneum Gonz. Frag. (1924)
- Dictyosporium cocophylum Bat. (1951)
- Dictyosporium crustaceum (P.Karst.) S.Hughes (1958)
- Dictyosporium digitatum J.L.Chen, C.H.Hwang & Tzean (1991)
- Dictyosporium elegans Corda (1836)
- Dictyosporium foliicola P.M.Kirk (1984)
- Dictyosporium gauntii Bhat & B.Sutton (1985)
- Dictyosporium guttulatum Tibpromma & K.D.Hyde (2018)
- Dictyosporium hongkongensis Tibpromma & K.D.Hyde (2018)
- Dictyosporium hughesii McKenzie (2010)
- Dictyosporium hymenaearum Bat. & J.L.Bezerra (1960)
- Dictyosporium krabiense Tibpromma & K.D.Hyde (2018)
- Dictyosporium lakefuxianense L.Cai, K.D.Hyde & McKenzie (2003)
- Dictyosporium manglietiae Kodsueb & McKenzie (2006)
- Dictyosporium marinum Dayar. & E.B.G.Jones (2020)
- Dictyosporium meiosporum Boonmee & K.D.Hyde (2015)
- Dictyosporium minus Sacc. (1921)
- Dictyosporium muriformis N.G.Liu, K.D.Hyde & J.K.Liu (2020)
- Dictyosporium nigroapice Goh, W.H.Ho & K.D.Hyde (1999)
- Dictyosporium oblongum (Fuckel) S.Hughes (1958)
- Dictyosporium olivaceosporum Kaz. Tanaka, K.Hiray., Boonmee & K.D.Hyde (2016)
- Dictyosporium palmae Abdel-Aziz (2016)
- Dictyosporium pandani Whitton, K.D.Hyde & McKenzie (2012)
- Dictyosporium pandanicola Tibpromma & K.D.Hyde (2018)
- Dictyosporium pelagicum (Linder) G.C.Hughes ex E.B.G.Jones (1963)
- Dictyosporium polystichum (Höhn.) Damon (1952)
- Dictyosporium prolificum Damon (1952)
- Dictyosporium rhopalostylidis McKenzie (2010)
- Dictyosporium schizostachyfolium Bat. & M.L.Farr (1960)
- Dictyosporium sexuale Boonmee & K.D.Hyde (2016)
- Dictyosporium sinense H.M.Liu & T.Y.Zhang (2009)
- Dictyosporium solanii A.D.Sharma, Munjal & Jandaik (1983)
- Dictyosporium splendidum Alves-Barb., Malosso & R.F.Castañeda (2017)
- Dictyosporium stellatum G.P.White & Seifert (2011)
- Dictyosporium strelitziae Crous & A.R.Wood (2009)
- Dictyosporium taishanense G.Z.Zhao & T.Y.Zhang (2003)
- Dictyosporium tetraseriale Goh, Yanna & K.D.Hyde (1999)
- Dictyosporium tetrasporum L.Cai & K.D.Hyde (2007)
- Dictyosporium thailandicum M.J.D'souza, Bhat & K.D.Hyde (2015)
- Dictyosporium tratense J.Yang & K.D.Hyde (2018)
- Dictyosporium triramosum Aramb., Cabello & Cazau (2001)
- Dictyosporium triseriale Matsush. (1980)
- Dictyosporium tubulatum J.Yang, K.D.Hyde & Z.Y.Liu (2018)
- Dictyosporium wuyiense Y.Zhang & G.Z.Zhao (2017)
- Dictyosporium yerbae Speg. (1909)
- Dictyosporium yunnanense L.Cai, K.D.Hyde & McKenzie (2003)
- Dictyosporium zeylanicum Petch (1917)
- Dictyosporium zhejiangense Wongs., H.K.Wang, K.D.Hyde & F.C.Lin (2009)
