= Pteropsida =

Pteropsida is a subdivision of vascular plants that is no longer in use. It included all flowering plants and ferns and was divided into Filicinae, Gymnospermae, and Angiospermae.

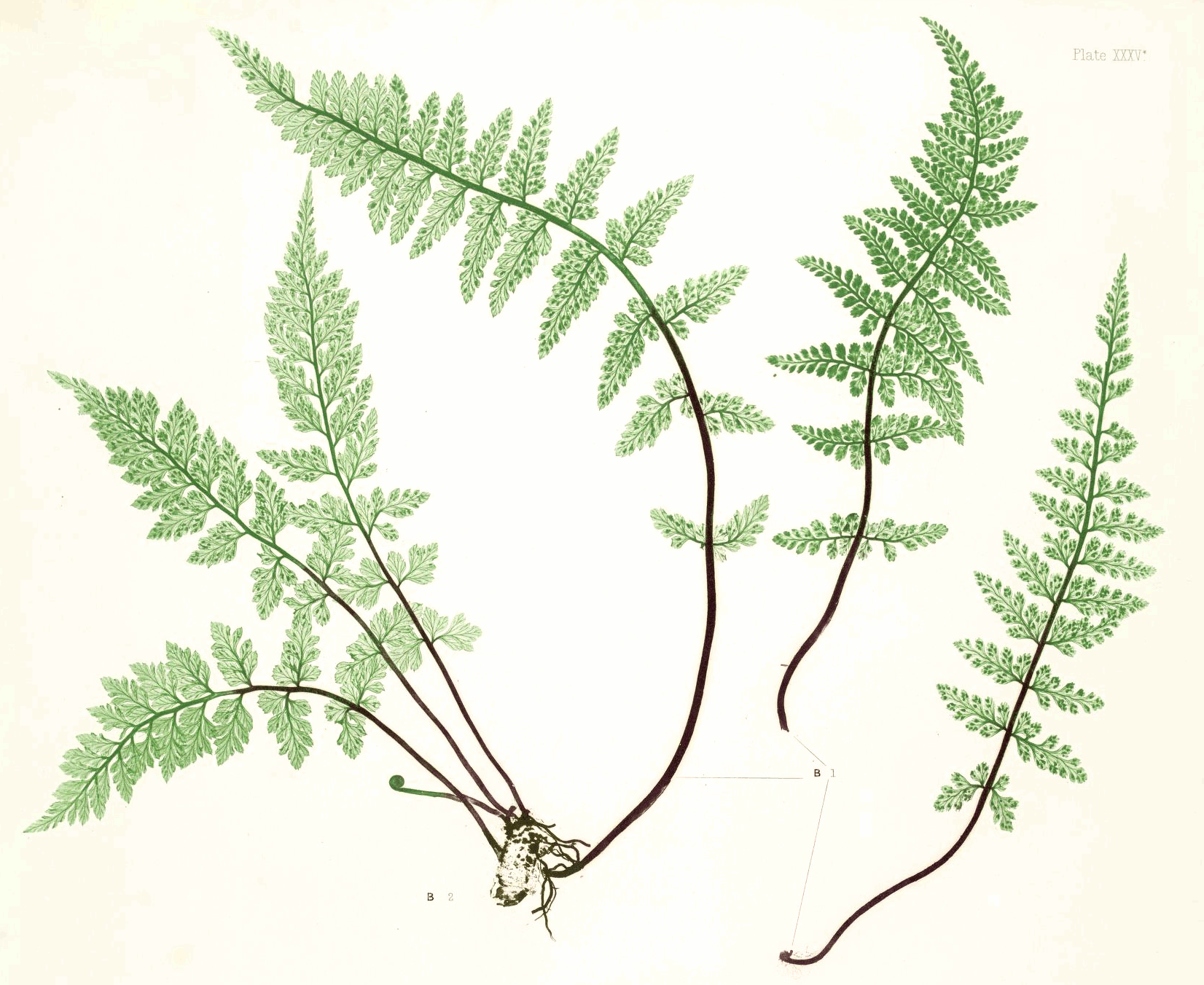
Pteropsida
