= Suliszowice =

- Village
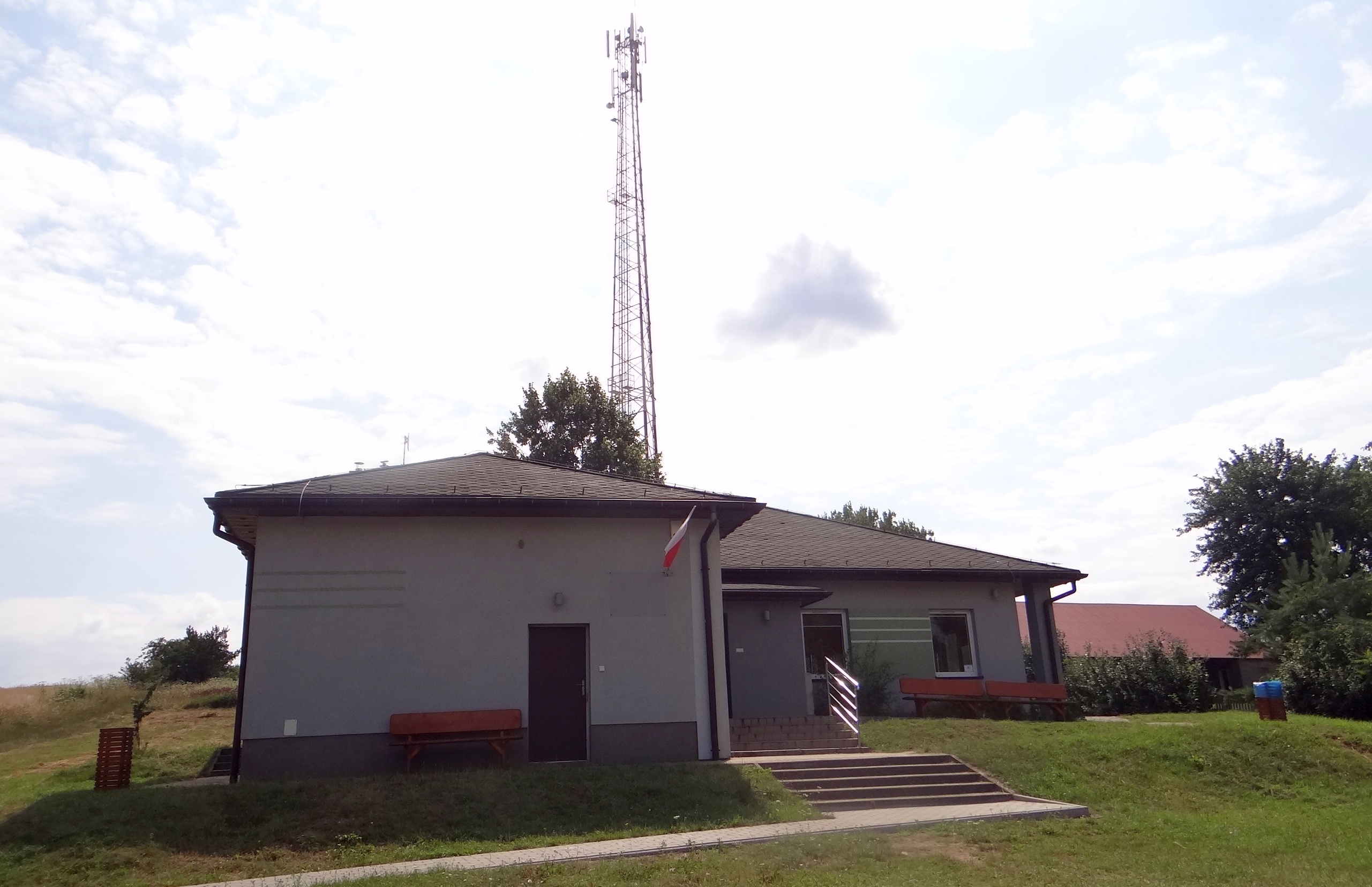
- School

- Location within Poland
- Coordinates: 50°41′N 19°22′E
- Country: Poland
- Voivodeship: Silesian
- County: Myszków
- Gmina: Żarki

Suliszowice [suliʂɔˈvit͡sɛ] is a village in the administrative district of Gmina Żarki, within Myszków County, Silesian Voivodeship, in southern Poland.
