= Poręba =

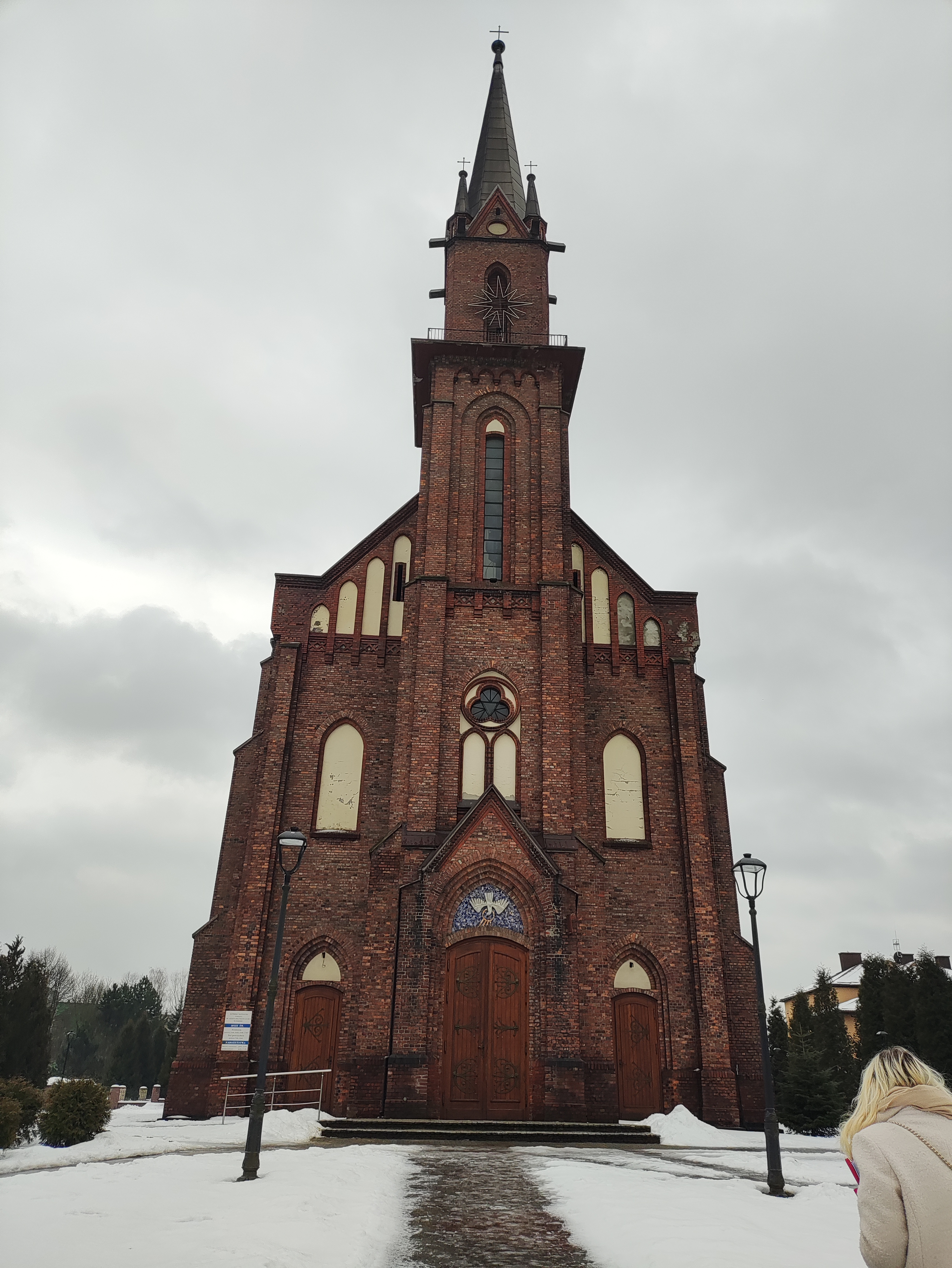
- Saint Joseph church in Poręba

- Coat of arms

- Location within Poland
- Coordinates: 50°29′34″N 19°20′1″E
- Country: Poland
- Voivodeship: Silesian
- County: Zawiercie
- Gmina: Poręba (urban gmina)

Area
  - Total: 40.04 km^{2} (15.46 sq mi)

Population (2019-06-30)
  - Total: 8,525
  - Density: 212.9/km^{2} (551.4/sq mi)
- Time zone: UTC+1 (CET)
  - Summer (DST): UTC+2 (CEST)
- Postal code: 42-480
- Vehicle registration: SZA
- Website: https://www.umporeba.pl/

Poręba [pɔˈrɛmba] is a town in Zawiercie County, Silesian Voivodeship, in southern Poland, with 8,525 inhabitants (2019). The town has the area of 40 km^{2} (15 sq mi). It also has a rail station on a line from Miasteczko Śląskie to Zawiercie. Almost half of Poręba's area (49%) is covered by forests.

== History ==
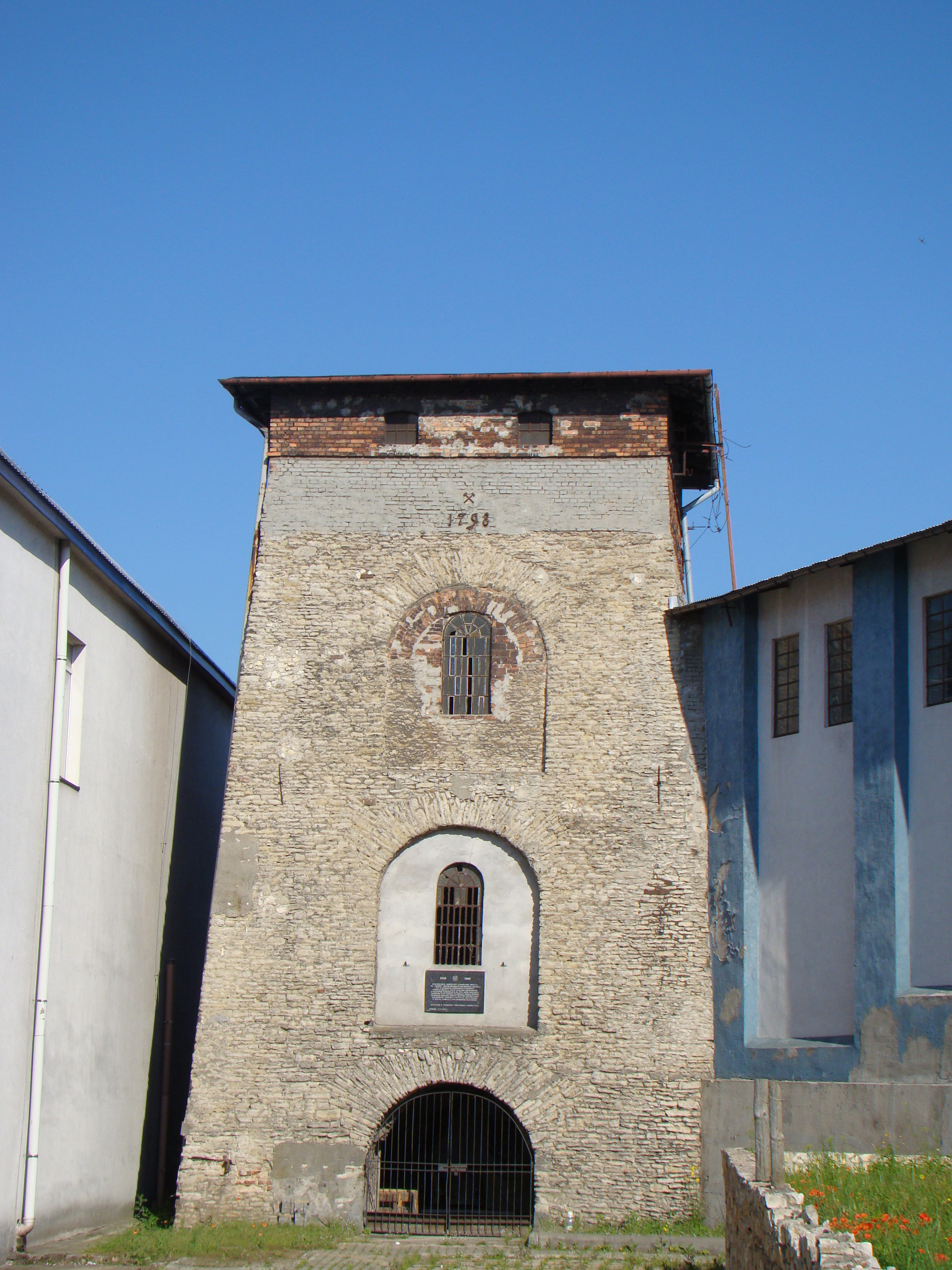
18th-century industrial tower

Poręba belongs to Lesser Poland, and until 1795 (see Partitions of Poland), it was part of the Kraków Voivodeship of the Lesser Poland Province of the Kingdom of Poland. First mention of the Poręba settlement comes from 1375, and at that time, it was called Black Poręba, located by a lake called Black Lake. Until the 16th century, the area was sparsely populated, and covered by dense woods. The development of industry resulted in influx of settlers, and in the 16th century Poręba became a center of early steel and iron plants. The village belonged at that time to the Pilecki family. In 1795, after the Third Partition of Poland, it was annexed by Prussia. The first blast furnace was built in 1798 by efforts of Count Łukasz Bniński. In 1806 the village was regained by Poles, and included within the short-lived Polish Duchy of Warsaw, and in 1815, it became part of Russian-controlled Congress Poland, and Poręba further developed, becoming a local industrial center.

In 1918 Poręba returned to the re-created Poland, and in the Second Polish Republic, the settlement belonged to Kielce Voivodeship. During World War II, Poręba was occupied by Germany from 1939 to 1945. Poręba developed further in the 1950s, when local metal plant began manufacturing machine tools. A vocational school was opened in 1946, which in the late 1960s moved into a new complex. Furthermore, in the 1960s, a recreational center for local workers was built. In 1975–1982, Poręba was a district of Zawiercie.

In 2008, Triassic turtle remains were discovered in the area.

== Sports ==
The local football club is MKS Poręba. It competes in the lower leagues.

== Cuisine ==
Prażonki is a traditional regional dish originating from Poręba. It is prepared from potatoes, onions, kiełbasa, bacon, lard, salt, pepper and cabbage. Other officially protected traditional foods from Poręba are kiełbasa porębska, a local type of kiełbasa, and szynka wieprzowa parzona porębska, a local type of steamed ham (as designated by the Ministry of Agriculture and Rural Development of Poland).

== Twin towns – sister cities ==
Poręba is twinned with:

- Kistelek, Hungary
- Vynnyky, Ukraine
