= Bogusław Fornalczyk =

Polish cyclist (1937–2025)

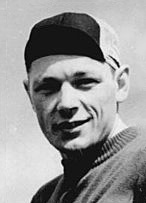
- Fornalczyk in 1960

Personal information
- Born: 3 June 1937 Jaworznik, Poland
- Died: 1 October 2025 (aged 88)
- Height: 1.77 m (5 ft 10 in)
- Weight: 77 kg (170 lb)

Sport
- Sport: Cycling
- Club: LZS Myszków

Bogusław Fornalczyk (3 June 1937 – 1 October 2025) was a Polish cyclist. He competed at the 1960 Summer Olympics in the road race and 100 km team time trial and finished in 11th and 10th place, respectively. He won the race Polska – Ukraina in 1958, 1959 and 1961, as well as the Tour de Pologne in 1958.

During his career, Fornalczyk won five national titles (1958–1961) and took part in four world championships (1958, 1959, 1961, 1962) and six Peace Races (1958–1963). He graduated from a mining school.

Fornalczyk was married and had two daughters, Bożenę and Ewę. He lived in Bedzin. Fornalczyk died on 1 October 2025, at the age of 88.
