= Jaworznik =

- Village
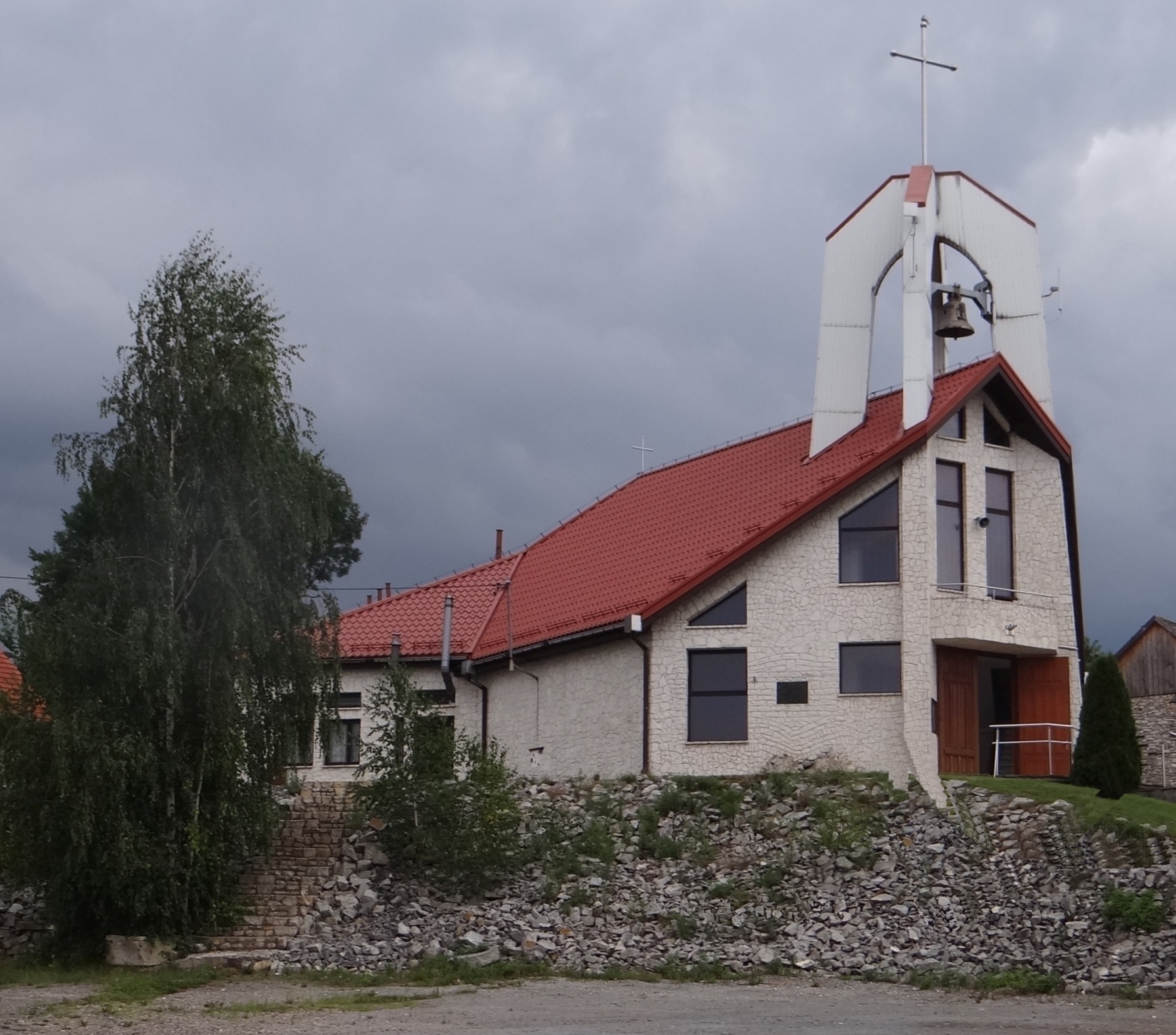
- Church of the Divine Mercy

- Location within Poland
- Coordinates: 50°36′N 19°25′E
- Country: Poland
- Voivodeship: Silesian
- County: Myszków
- Gmina: Żarki

Population
  - Total: 750

Jaworznik [jaˈvɔʐnik] is a village in the administrative district of Gmina Żarki, within Myszków County, Silesian Voivodeship, in southern Poland.

== Notable people ==
- Bogusław Fornalczyk, Polish cyclist
