= Jaroszów, Silesian Voivodeship =

Jaroszów
- Village
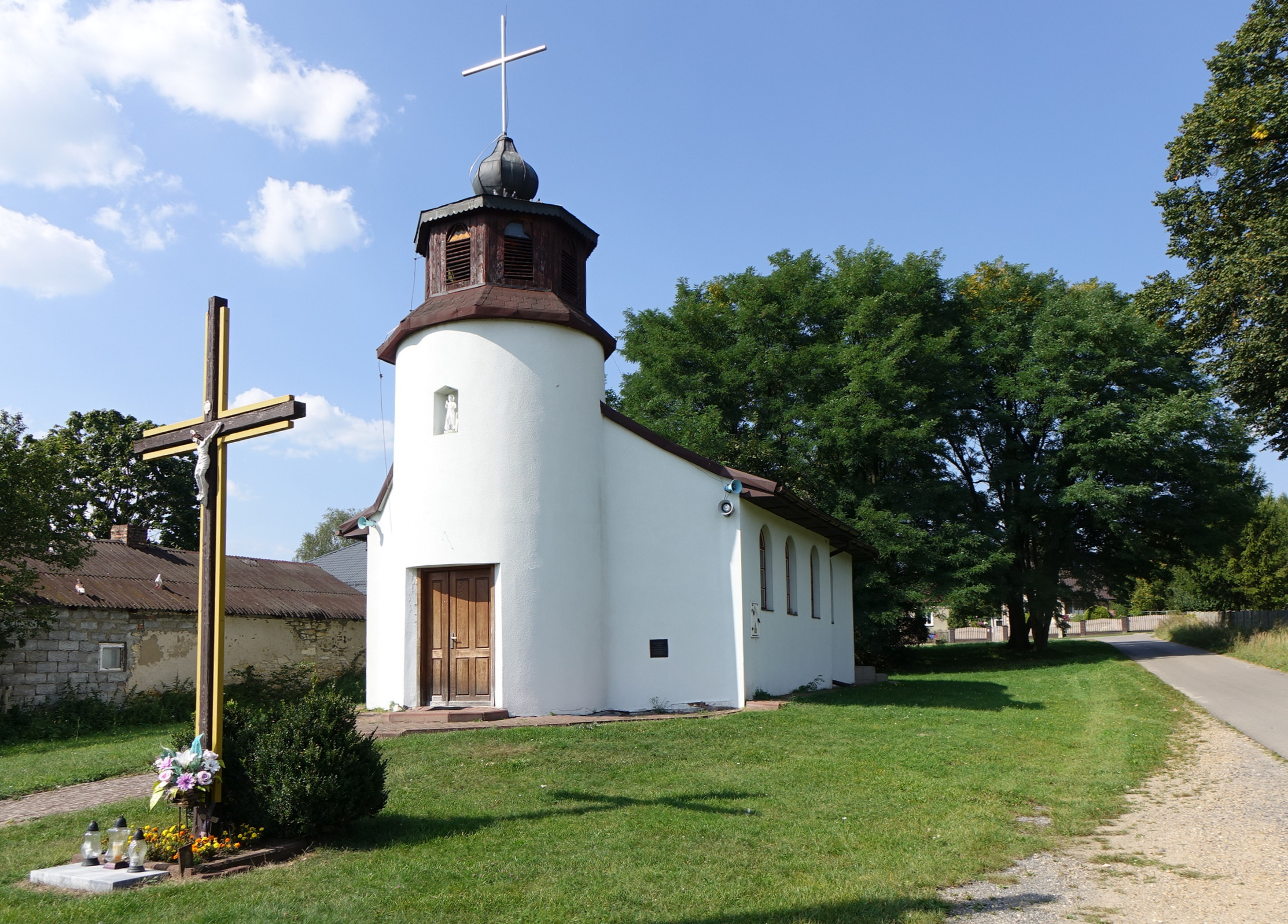
- Catholic church

- Location within Poland
- Coordinates: 50°39′22″N 19°21′29″E
- Country: Poland
- Voivodeship: Silesian
- County: Myszków
- Gmina: Żarki

Jaroszów [jaˈrɔʂuf] is a village in the administrative district of Gmina Żarki, within Myszków County, Silesian Voivodeship, in southern Poland.
