= Calcare di Sogno =

Geological formation in Italy

- Stratigraphic range: Lower Toarcian-Late Bajocian; ~182–169 Ma
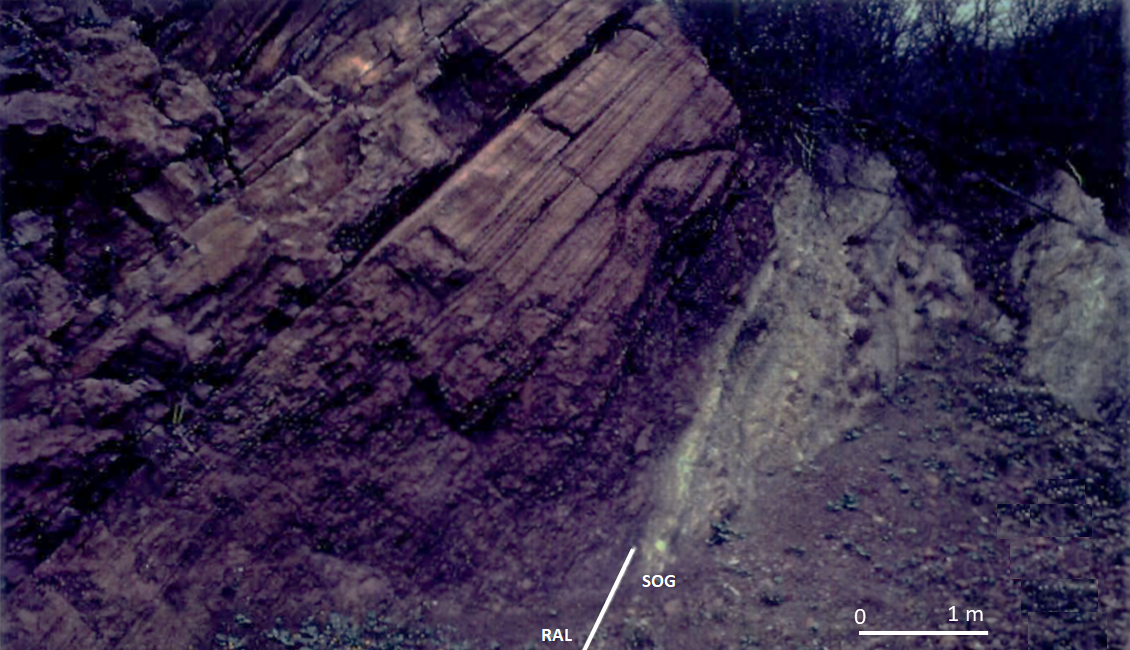
- The transition (Tsg) between Sogno Formation (SOG) and Rosso Ammonitico Lombardo (RAL) at Cesana Brianza
- Type: Geological formation
- Sub-units: Livello a Pesci
- Underlies: Formazione delle Radiolariti
- Overlies: Calcare di Domaro, Calcare di Morbio, Unnamed limestones (Note: Bioturbed hazel-gray limestones in planar layers of about 20 cm, with concentration of gray flint and gray & reddish marls, along with calcareous marl.)
- Thickness: Typically 120–140 m (390–460 ft); East and west 70–100 m (230–330 ft)

Lithology
- Primary: Marl, marly limestone & abundance of clay Secondary: Alternation of marly limestones and marls, presence of graded Chalcudites
- Other: Limestones with nodules of flint & subordinate marls

Location
- Coordinates: 45.8°N 9.3°E
- Approximate paleocoordinates: 33.4°N 18.9°E
- Region: Lecco Province
- Country: Italy

Type section
- Named for: Sogno
- Named by: Gaetani & Poliani
- Calcare di Sogno (Italy) Calcare di Sogno (Lombardy)

The Calcare di Sogno ("Sogno Limestone"; also known as the Sogno Formation) is a geological formation that crops out with typical characteristics in the western Bergamo Prealps, near the border with the Province of Lecco. It outcrops along a northwest–southeast trend running approximately between the municipality of Erve (on the left hydrographic bank of the Adda River) and the municipality of Palazzago (on the right hydrographic bank of the Brembo River). The formation was proposed by Gaetani and Poliani (1978) and formalized by Delfrati et al. (2000). It comprises a rather composite succession of grey and reddish calcareous-marl alternations, generally non-nodular, occasionally with chert nodules and lenses, and subordinate dark claystones. This unit was previously referred to the Rosso Ammonitico Lombardo and represents a lateral equivalent of it.In addition to the type area, the formation is present west of the Adda River in outcrops of limited stratigraphic thickness (areas of Canzo and Cesana Brianza, Alpe del Viceré, and Monte Olimpino near Como). In this context the unit consists of grey-greenish or grey-bluish clayey-marl lithotypes equivalent to the basal part of the formation in the type area, and passes upward into the Rosso Ammonitico Lombardo. On the basis of its paleontological content, the unit is assignable — in its most complete expression — to the Toarcian–lower Bajocian. Thalattosuchian remains are known from the formation, as well as fish and other taxa.

== Description ==
During the Early Jurassic, concretely towards the Toarcian, the Lombardy Basin became a relatively deep, fully pelagic area, located between the so-called Lugano High, at the west, and the Trento Plateau to the east, with several troughs and palaeohighs (West to east: Monte Nudo Trough, Lugano High, Generoso Trough, Corni di Canzo High, Albenza Plateau, Monte Cavallo High, Sebino Trough and Botticino High). The formation is characterized by a disposition of regional deposition equivalent to the German Posidonia Shale, with a benthic setting and deposition trends, mostly populated by marine fauna. The formation is traditionally subdivided into three informal lithozones, from base to top:

- Lithozone 1: thickness between 20 and 40 m; prevailing grey marly limestones and reddish marls, with laminated grey-blackish argillites in the middle part, fossiliferous with fish remains;
- Lithozone 2: thickness between 50 and 70 m; rhythmic alternations of marly limestones in beds around 30–40 cm thick (chert-bearing upward), and marly interbeds ranging from centimetric to decimetric, rich in pelagic bivalves (Bositra), locally forming shell beds (lumachelles); coarse-grained graded clastic beds occur at the western margin of the type area.
- Lithozone 3: thickness between 30 and 40 m; grey and reddish marly limestones in thin undulated beds with centimetric marly-pelitic partings, sometimes passing upward into red marls, containing Bositra and radiolaria, with the latter becoming increasingly abundant toward the top.

West of the Adda River, in the areas surrounding the paleo-high of the Corni di Canzo, the formation consists of micaceous blue-green marls and laminated claystones passing upward into the Rosso Ammonitico Lombardo. The environment of the formation was related to a marginal marine deposit, with probably epicontinental deposition from near land environments, being connected to the central European seas and the North African currents of the Toarcian. The formation is linked with the Toarcian Anoxic Event, that is measured in the "Fish Level", that is also the most fossiliferous section.

== Environment ==
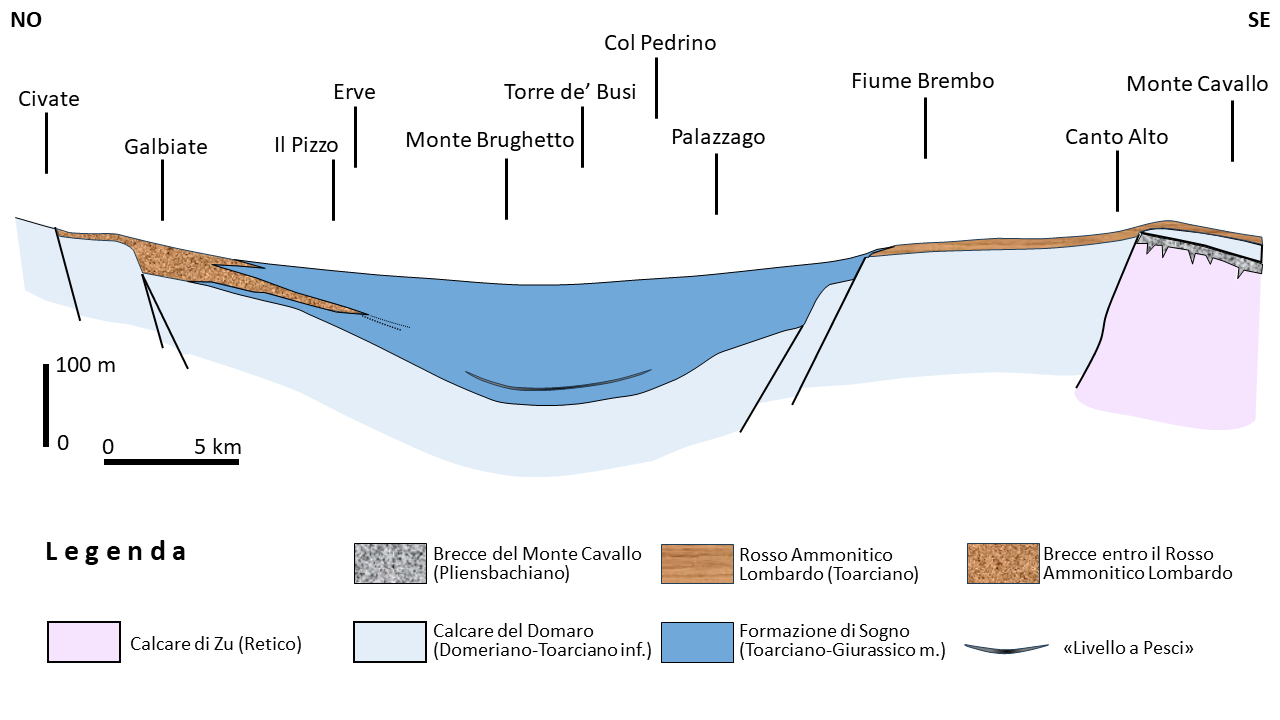
Stratigraphic and paleogeographic scheme of the Sogno Formation

Two cores, the Colle di Sogno and Gajum are among the best sections that recovered the ecological changes in the Pliensbachian-Toarcian Lombardy Basin. Carbon-and oxygen-isotope data calibrated against nannofossil biostratigraphy has shown that the palaeobathymetry of the deposits was about 1000 and 1500 m, being the deepest records of the T-OAE in the western Tethyan region. As the Sogno Formation was deposited mostly in a pelagic setting, influenced by both the European and African bioregions, taxa of several provenances mix in this layer. The Nannofosil assemblage, that ranges from moderate/poor to good decreasing in the Toarcian AOE (drastic decrease in total abundance is observed in the Fish Level), includes the taxa Lotharingius (L. hauffii, L. sigillatus, L. crucicentralis, L. velatus), Discorhabdus ignotus, Diductius constans, Carinolithus (C. poulnabronei, C. superbus), Mitrolithus jansae and Watznaueria sp.1 in the Gajum Core, while the Sogno Core shows abundance of the genera Biscutum, Calyculus, Carinolithus and Crepidolithus, whereas Bussonius, Diductius, Similiscutum, Parhabdolithus and Tubirhabdus are extremely rare. The overall structure of this microtaxa assemblage trends to suggest a correlation with the biohorizon seen in coeval layers in the Lusitanian Basin, where a common trend is observed in the Western Tethys of north–south migration pathway for several organisms, including calcareous nannoplankton and ammonites.

A local index genus for environment evolution is Schizosphaerella spp. (specially S. punctulata), showing a lower valve size than in coeval layers on connected basins (Lusitanian and Paris Basins), as local result of the Lower Toarcian Jenkyns Event, indicating changes in ocean acidification and fertility rather than temperature.

== Fossil content ==
=== Ichnofossils ===
| Genus | Species | Location | Material | Type | Origin | Notes | Images |
|---|---|---|---|---|---|---|---|
| Planolites | P. isp. | Colle di Sogno | Cylindrical burrows | Pascichnia | Polychaetes | Burrow-like ichnofossils referred to vermiform deposit-feeders. Sometimes considered a junior synonym of Palaeophycus. | Planolites fossil specimen (from Denmark) |

=== Molluscs ===
| Genus | Species | Stratigraphic position | Material | Notes | Images |
|---|---|---|---|---|---|
| Bositra | B. buchii | Most of the formation | Shells | A posidoniid ostreoidan. | Thousands of specimens in one matrix |
| Collina | C. gemma | Mount Brughetto; Mount Cornizzolo | Shells | A Dactylioceratidae ammonite. Present and abundant on the Mediterranean Toarcian realm. | |
| Cornaptychus | C. lythensis | Mount Brughetto; Mount Cornizzolo | Shells | An indeterminate ammonite. Some of the specimens found are very fragmentary, making its identification complex. | Cornaptychus |
| Dactylioceras | D. polymorphus | Mount Brughetto; Mount Cornizzolo | Shells | Type member Dactylioceratinae family of Ammonites. A common Mediterranean genus, found in deposits across all of Europe. | Dactylioceras |
| Harpoceras | H. sp. | Mount Brughetto; Mount Cornizzolo | Shells | Type genus of the Harpoceratinae ammonite family | Harpoceras |
| Hildaites | H. sp. | Mount Brughetto; Mount Cornizzolo | Shells | A Hildoceratidae ammonite | Hildaites |
| Mesodactylites | M. sapphicus; M. sp. | Mount Brughetto; Mount Cornizzolo | Shells | A Nodicoeloceratinae ammonite | |

=== Echinoderms ===
| Genus | Species | Stratigraphic position | Material | Notes | Images |
|---|---|---|---|---|---|
| Isocrinus | I. cf. basaltiformis; I. (Chladocrinus) jurensis | Val Cava, M. Albenza | Ossicles | Isocrinidae Sea lilies | |

=== Arthropods ===
| Genus | Species | Stratigraphic position | Material | Notes | Images |
|---|---|---|---|---|---|
| ?Antrimpos | ?A. sp. | Mount Cornizzolo | 1 complete specimen, MSNM i10852 | A Penaeidae Decapodan. | Antrimpos |
| Archaeopalinurus | A. cfr. A. levis | Mount Cornizzolo | Various specimens | A Palinuroidean Decapodan. | Archaeopalinurus |
| Coleia | C. cf.banzensis | Mount Cornizzolo | 15 specimens, complete and incomplete | An Erymidae Decapodan. | Coleia |
| ?Etallonia | ?E. sp. | Mount Cornizzolo | Single Isolated chelae, MSNM i10855 | An Axiidae Decapodan. | Etallonia |
| Gabaleryon | G. garassinoi | Mount Brughetto; Mount Cornizzolo | Various specimens | A Coleiidae Decapodan. Was confused with Proeryon hartmanni specimens. | |
| Proeryon | P. hartmanni | Mount Brughetto; Mount Cornizzolo | Various specimens | An Erymidae Decapodan Crustacean, common in Mediterranean formations. | Proeryon hartmanni |
| Uncina | U. cf.posidoniae U. alpina | Mount Cornizzolo | Isolated chelae, MSNM i10851, il0863, i10864 | An Astacidean Decapodan of the family Uncinidae. A large decapodan, with sizes up to 40 cm. | Uncina |

=== Fish ===
| Genus | Species | Stratigraphic position | Material | Notes | Images |
|---|---|---|---|---|---|
| Leptolepis | L. coryphaenoides; L. sp. | Monte Cornizzolo | +100 specimens | Type member of the family Leptolepidae inside Leptolepiformes. It is the most abundant fish found in the formation. | Leptolepis |
| Pachycormus | P. sp. | Monte Cornizzolo | Several specimens | The main member of the family Pachycormidae inside Pachycormiformes. Large sized fish, able to reach near 1.4 m long. | Pachycormus |
| Pholidophorus | P. sp. | Monte Cornizzolo | Several specimens | Type member of the family Pholidophoridae inside Pachycormiformes. | Pholidophorus |

=== Crocodyliformes ===
| Genus | Species | Location | Material | Notes | Images |
|---|---|---|---|---|---|
| cf.Pelagosaurus | cf. P. sp. | Monte Cornizzolo | Various specimens MSNM V4012, MSNM V4013. | A Thalattosuchian marine crocodylomorph of the family Teleosauridae.The specimens found were of small size, with several characters that show a possible juvenile or subadult status. | Pelagosaurus |

=== Flora ===
Several plant leaves and fragments of wood were not identified.

| Genus | Species | Stratigraphic position | Material | Notes | Images |
|---|---|---|---|---|---|
| Ginkgo | G. digitata | Mount Brughetto; Mount Cornizzolo | Leaves | Affinities with the Ginkgoaceae. Arboreal plants related to the modern Ginkgo species. | Ginkgo digitata |
| Pagiophyllum | P. kurri | Mount Brughetto; Mount Cornizzolo | Leaves | Affinities with the Cheirolepidiaceae and Araucariaceae. Arbustive to arboreal plants with several leaf morphotypes, probably from nearshore environments. | Pagiophyllum |

== See also ==
- List of fossiliferous stratigraphic units in Italy
- Toarcian turnover
- Toarcian formations
  - Marne di Monte Serrone, Italy
  - Podpeč Limestone, Slovenia
  - El Pedregal Formation, Spain
  - Mizur Formation, North Caucasus
  - Sachrang Formation, Austria
  - Posidonia Shale, Lagerstätte in Germany
  - Irlbach Sandstone, Germany
  - Ciechocinek Formation, Germany and Poland
  - Krempachy Marl Formation, Poland and Slovakia
  - Djupadal Formation, Central Skane
  - Lava Formation, Lithuania
  - Azilal Group, North Africa
  - Whitby Mudstone, England
  - Fernie Formation, Alberta and British Columbia
    - Poker Chip Shale
  - Whiteaves Formation, British Columbia
  - Navajo Sandstone, Utah
  - Los Molles Formation, Argentina
  - Mawson Formation, Antarctica
  - Kandreho Formation, Madagascar
  - Kota Formation, India
  - Cattamarra Coal Measures, Australia
