= Saubach Formation =

Geological formation in Austria and Germany, about 180–174 million years old

- Stratigraphic range: lower-mid Toarcian; ~180 Ma
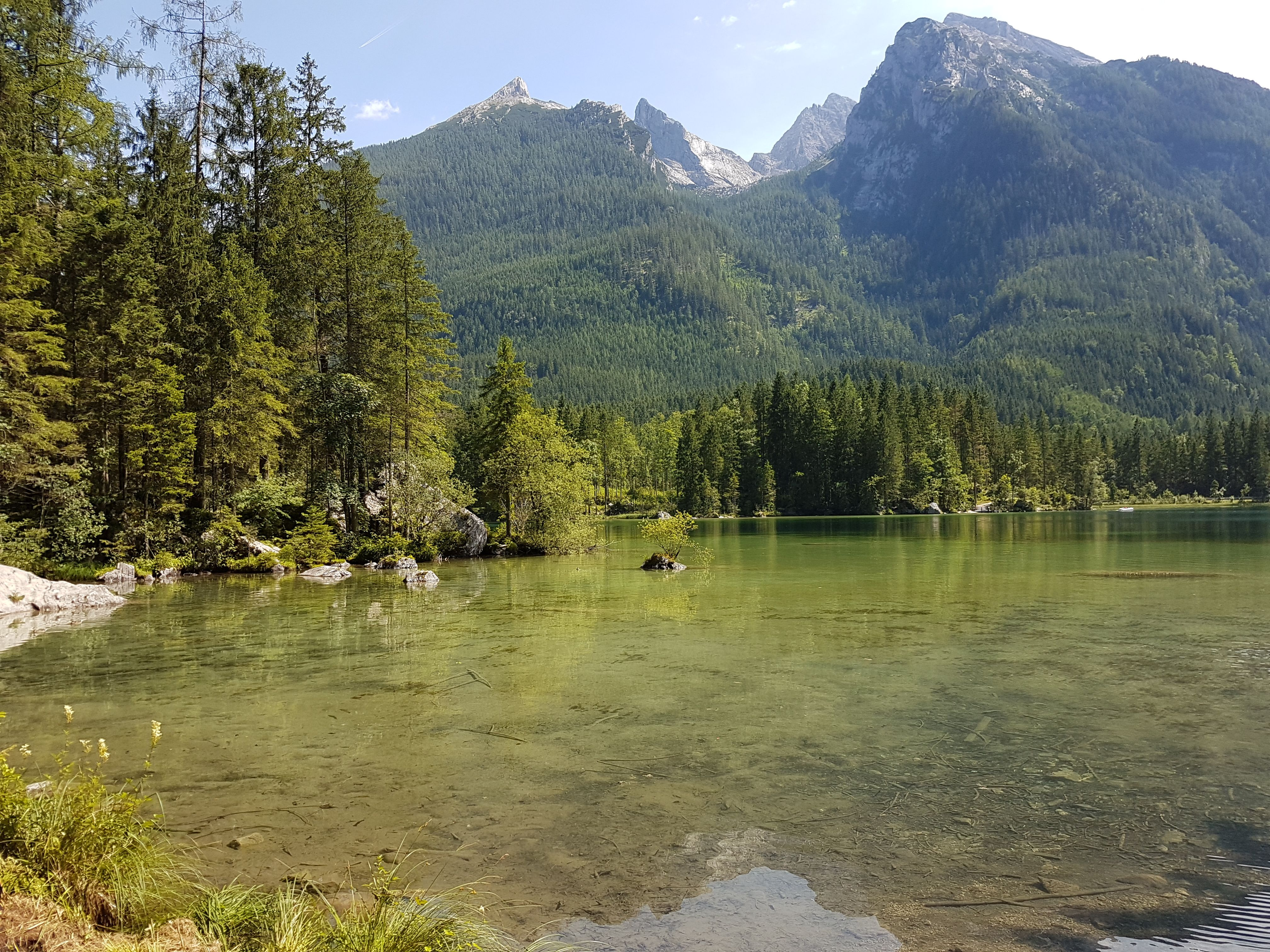
- The Main Unit of the formation crops out near the Hintersee
- Type: Geological formation
- Sub-units: Unken Member
- Underlies: Klaus Formation
- Overlies: Scheibelberg & Adnet Formations
- Thickness: 1–15 m (3.3–49.2 ft)

Lithology
- Primary: Brick red marls with intercalated limestone beds
- Other: Bioclastic wackestones and packstones with breccia layers

Location
- Region: Osterhorn Mountains
- Country: Austria

Type section
- Named for: Saubach, a little creek southeast of Schafbachalm
- Named by: Krainer & Mostler
- Year defined: 1997
- Saubach Formation (Austria)

The Saubach Formation is a geological formation in Austria and Germany, dating to about 180–174 million years ago. It was described originally as Saubachschichten in 1975, and classified as part of the Lower Jurassic Adnet Group.

== Description ==
This formation is part of a near-shore to epicontinental marine-influenced deposits, coeval in age with the Sachrang Formation, that was more likely a linked pelagic deposit. After the drowning of the local Rhaetian reef slope and in the adjacent basin, Sinemurian–Toarcian local members were formed as a sequence of increasingly near pelagic sedimentation during the middle and late Liassic. The Coeval on the lowermost part Scheck Member has evidence of a series of large scale tectonic activities culminating during the late Pliensbachian and early Toarcian, probably linked to the Vulcanism of the adjacent Irkut Basin. In contrast to the "Adneter Mergel", the Saubach Formation lacks grey marls. In the type area, located at the Saubachgraben near Hintersee (largely destroyed and buried) consists of predominantly red sequences. In some locations, such as Gaissau, the Saubach Formation is dominated by red condensed limestones with only minor marl intercalations. In 1997 the name Saubach Formation was suggested, representing originally a series of Green Bituminous Marls on the Unken Sincline, identical to the strata of the Saubach Member of the Adnet Group. Later it was shown that the Saubach Member and the Saubach formation belong to a unique entity, that can be called by both names, and represent a series of marls deposited on marginal marine to Pelagic environments, linked with the Red Marl of the Sachrang Formation.

== Fossil content ==
On Scheibelberg appears with a relatively sharp boundary of just banked and slightly bulbous, greenish gray, rarely also slightly reddish Marl overlaid with Limestone and marl. This sequence was interpreted as the main outcrop of the Saubach formation. Switched along these strata in the Saubach Formation are up to 5 m thick bitumen Marbles. There are fossils of Belemnnites, Ammonites and Echinoderms, where Ostracodans and Foraminifera are only to be found very isolated. A group of Bioclastic wackestone is present, and consists of a micro-matrix with plenty of thin shell remains scattered loosely. Furthermore, are Echinoderm remains, Ostracodes, foraminifera, radiolaria and represented spiculae. Authentic Pyrite is found in patches to observe. There is an alternate deposition composed mostly by bioclastic wackestone with Echinoderm remains, and other with Mudstone, with abundant echinoderms, foraminifera, Gastropods, echinid spines and pebble spicules. A series of greenish-gray marl Lime facies is rich in Ammonites, including the species Collina cf. gemma, linking the deposit to the Lower Toarcian. The Biota recovered on the Type strata of the formation suggest that the Saubach Formation was deposited with influence of deeper waters.

Color key
Taxon	Reclassified taxon	Taxon falsely reported as present	Dubious taxon or junior synonym	Ichnotaxon	Ootaxon	Morphotaxon

Notes
Uncertain or tentative taxa are in small text; ~~crossed out~~ taxa are discredited.

=== Sporomorphs ===
Several plant leaves and fragments of wood weren't identified.

Genus	Species	Stratigraphic position	Material	Notes	Images
Cingutriletes	Cingutriletes crassimarginatus	Upper Cresten Coals	Spores	Affinities with Bryophyta. Spores from Mosses, probably linked with high humid environments. Related with the more common and more studied coal sections of the lower liassic of Gresten.	
Stereisporites	Stereisporites antiquasporites	Upper Cresten Coals	Spores	Affinities with Bryopsida. Spores from Mosses, probably linked with high humid environments. Related with the more common and more studied coal sections of the lower liassic of Gresten.	
Lycopodiumsporites	Lycopodiumsporites sp	Upper Cresten Coals	Spores	Affinities with Lycopodiaceae inside Lycopsida. Spores from vascular plants, including all of the core clubmosses. Are found associated with Lagoonal, Deltaic or other similar deposits.	
Vitreisporites	Vitreisporites sp	Upper Cresten Coals	Spores	Affinities with Gymnospermophyta. Uncertain Classification	
Leschikisporis	Leschikisporis aduncus	Upper Cresten Coals	Spores	Affinities with Blechnales. Spores from Indeterminate Fern Genera	
Dictyophyllidites	Dictyophyllidites austriensis; Dictyophyllidites enigmaticus	Upper Cresten Coals	Spores	Affinities with Matoniaceae inside Gleicheniales. Fern Spores related to large colonies of ferns, that are find on modern days on mostly Tropical Settings.	
Polypodiidites	Polypodiidites minutus	Upper Cresten Coals	Pollen	Affinities with Polypodiaceae. Spores from Rocks ferns.	
Simplicesporites	Simplicesporites sp	Upper Cresten Coals	Pollen	Affinities with Polypodiaceae. Spores from Rocks ferns.	
Laricoidites	Laricoidites sp	Upper Cresten Coals	Pollen	Affinities with Gymnospermopsida. Pollen related with Cycadophytes and Coniferophytes.	
Ginkgocycadophytus	Ginkgocycadophytus sp	Upper Cresten Coals	Pollen	Affinities with Cycadophyta. Pollen related to arbustive to arboreal plants	
Ginkgoretectina	Ginkgoretectina sp	Upper Cresten Coals	Pollen	Affinities with Ginkgoales. Pollen from arboreal plants related with modern Ginkgos, probably from nearshore forests.	

=== Gastropoda ===
Genus	Species	Stratigraphic position	Material	Notes	Images
Ataphrus	Ataphrus? leviusculus	Bischof quarry; Dumberger quarry	Shells	A Sea Snail, type member of the family Ataphridae inside Trochoidea. While most of the specimens were recovered from the slightly older Hierlatz Limestone a series of similar specimens were recovered on the Saubach Realm. There are more than a dozen local gastropod specimens without identification.	

=== Cephalopoda ===
Genus	Species	Stratigraphic position	Material	Notes	Images
Lytoceras	Lytoceras fimbriatum	Gaissau	Shells	Type Lytoceratidae ammonite	
Collina	Collina gemma	Gaissau	Shells	Type Dactylioceratidae ammonite. Found mostly on the mediterranean realm.	
Ligeiceras	Ligeiceras jurense	Bischof quarry; Dumberger quarry	Shells	Type Nautilidae Nautilidan. This Nautiloid is one of the most abundant local cephalopods on the Toarcian Strata, linked to the most nearshore horizons of the Formation.	

=== Crustacea ===
Genus	Species	Stratigraphic position	Material	Notes	Images
Polycope	Polycope spp.	Bäreck; Scheibelberg	Valves	Type Ostracodan of the family Polycopidae. Marine ostracods, related to animals in the suborder Halocypridina.	
Liasina	Liasina lanceolata; Liasina vestibulifera	Bäreck; Scheibelberg	Valves	An Ostracodan of the family Pontocyprididae. Small marine ostracods related with abundant Green Algae environments	
Gramannicythere	? Gramannicythere "sp. A"; Gramannicythere "sp. B"	Bäreck; Scheibelberg	Valves	An Ostracodan of the family Pontocyprididae. Small marine ostracods	
Kinkelinella	? Kinkelinella sp.	Scheibelberg	Valves	An Ostracodan of the family Pontocyprididae. Small marine ostracods	
Cardobairdia	Cardobairdia liasica; Cardobairdia "sp. A"	Bäreck; Scheibelberg	Valves	An Ostracodan of the family Saipanettidae. Small marine ostracods	
Bairdia	Bairdia cf. clio; Bairdia sp.	Bäreck; Scheibelberg	Valves	An Ostracodan of the family Bairdiidae. Small marine ostracods	
Bairdiacypris	Bairdiacypris cf. sartriensis; ? Bairdiacypris "form A"; Bairdiacypris "form B"; Bairdiacypris "form C"; Bairdiacypris "form D"; Bairdiacypris "form E"; Bairdiacypris "form F"; ? Bairdiacypris "form G"	Bäreck; Scheibelberg	Valves	An Ostracodan of the family Bairdiidae. Marine Ostracodans related with basinal deposits. Most diverse genus found on the formation	
Isobythocypris	Isobythocypris postera; Isobythocypris tatei	Scheibelberg	Valves	An Ostracodan of the family Bairdiidae. Marine Ostracodans related with basinal deposits.	
Ptychobairdia	Ptychobairdia schaubergeri	Scheibelberg	Valves	An Ostracodan of the family Bairdiidae. Marine Ostracodans related with basinal deposits.	
Fabalicypris	Fabalicypris "sp. A"	Bäreck; Scheibelberg	Valves	An Ostracodan of the family Bairdiidae. Marine Ostracodans related with basinal deposits.	
Bythocypris	Bythocypris sp.	Bäreck; Scheibelberg	Valves	Type Ostracodan of the family Bythocyprididae. Marine Ostracodans related with basinal deposits.	
Procytherura	Procytherura ex gr. suebica	Bäreck; Scheibelberg	Valves	Type Ostracodan of the family Cytheruridae. Ostracods found on Epicontinental waters	

=== Ophiuroidea ===
Genus	Species	Location	Material	Notes	Images
Ophioliassica	Ophioliassica ingridae	Unken	Fragmentary Arms	A Brittle star of the Family Myophiuroida. This genus is related with the lower Sinemurian strata, where is more common and was first described. Probably a marginal marine Genus.	
Ophiocapillus	Ophiocapillus verticiformis	Unken	Fragmentary Arms	A Brittle star of the Family Myophiuroida. Found only in this region, its fossils range since the Middle Sinemurian.	
Sinosura	Sinosura brodiei; Sinosura schneideri	Unken	Fragmentary Arms	A Brittle star of the Family Aplocomidae. Linked with coeval strata from France and Germany.	
Sigsbeia	Sigsbeia lunaris	Unken	Fragmentary Arms	A Brittle star of the Family Hemieuryalidae. The other material known from this genus comes mostly from France.	

=== Crinoidea ===
Genus	Species	Location	Material	Notes	Images
Pentacrinites	Pentacrinites quenstedti	Unken; Gissau; Hintersee	Stems	A Sea Lily, type genus of the Family Pentacrinitidae. Along with the genus Seridocrinus, Pentacrinites is the most known Pelagic Crinoid, linked to large tree rafts, as recovered on Holzmaden deposits from the same age.	

=== Holothuroidea ===
Genus	Species	Location	Material	Notes	Images
Neomicroantyx	Neomicroantyx ingridae	Salzburg	Holothurian Wheel	A Sea Cucumber of the Family Protocaudinidae. This new species and new genus shows a typical Palaeozoic "Microantyx"-type wheel from Early Jurassic sediments, being possibly related to the Ophiocistioidea family. It is considered by some authors a nomen nudum and has been synonymized with Staurocaudina.	Neomicroantyx has been Synonymyzed or aligned with the genus Staurocaudina, whose recent relatives include the genus Colochirus
Praeeuphronides	Praeeuphronides crassirimosus; Praeeuphronides latus; Praeeuphronides multiperforatus; Praeeuphronides simplex	Salzburg	Sclerites	A Sea Cucumber of the Family Stichopitidae.	
Syneuphronides	Syneuphronides jurassicus	Salzburg	Sclerites	A Sea Cucumber of the Family Stichopitidae. Related with soft substrates, such as sand or rubble, this Sclerites resemble the modern genus Isostichopus, but from a larger Sea Cucumber Genus. It is found associated with Abundant Foramifera.	Modern Genus Isostichopus can be related to Syneuphronides
Punctatites	Punctatites triplex; Punctatites aequiperforatus; Punctatites extensus	Salzburg	Sclerites	A Sea Cucumber of the Family Stichopitidae.	
Theelia	Theelia stellifera; Theelia liassica; Theelia loferensis	Salzburg	Sclerites	A Sea Cucumber of the Family Chiridotidae.	
Uncinulina	Uncinulina parvispinosa; Uncinulina acanthica; Uncinulina levis	Steinbruch	Sclerites	A Sea Cucumber of the Family Elasipodida. A Pelagic Sea Cucumber.	Example of Elasipodidan sea cucumber, Uncinulina was probably similar

== See also ==
- List of fossiliferous stratigraphic units in Austria
- Toarcian turnover
- Toarcian formations
- Marne di Monte Serrone, Italy
- Calcare di Sogno, Italy
- Mizur Formation, North Caucasus
- Úrkút Manganese Ore Formation, Hungary
- Posidonia Shale, Lagerstätte in Germany
- Ciechocinek Formation, Germany and Poland
- Krempachy Marl Formation, Poland and Slovakia
- Djupadal Formation, Central Skane
- Lava Formation, Lithuania
- Azilal Group, North Africa
- Whitby Mudstone, England
- Fernie Formation, Alberta and British Columbia
- Poker Chip Shale
- Whiteaves Formation, British Columbia
- Navajo Sandstone, Utah
- Los Molles Formation, Argentina
- Mawson Formation, Antarctica
- Kandreho Formation, Madagascar
- Kota Formation, India
- Cattamarra Coal Measures, Australia
