= Reynesoceras =

Reynesoceras Temporal range: Pliensbachian

Scientific classification
- Kingdom: Animalia
- Phylum: Mollusca
- Class: Cephalopoda
- Subclass: †Ammonoidea
- Order: †Ammonitida
- Family: †Dactylioceratidae
- Subfamily: †Dactylioceratinae
- Genus: †Reynesoceras; Spath, 1936

Type species
- Ammonites ragazzonii Hauer, 1861

Species
- R. ragazzonii Hauer, 1861; R. angulosum Wiedenmayer, 1980; R. morosum Bettoni, 1900; R. subanguinum Meneghini, 1875; R. acanthoides Reynès, 1868; R. ausonicum Fucini, 1900; R. dumortieri Del Campana, 1900; R. medolense Hauer, 1861; R. striatum Del Campana, 1900

Synonyms
- Aveyroniceras Pinna & Levi-Setti, 1971

Extinct genus of ammonites

Reynesoceras is genus of ammonites that lived during the upper Pliensbachian stage of early Jurassic. It has evolved from Prodactylioceras, or Cetonoceras. Dactylioceras (Eodactylites) has probably evolved from this genus. Aveyroniceras is a name for macroconchs of this genus. Their fossils were found in Europe, northern Africa, Asia, North America and South America.

== Description ==
Ammonites of this genus had shells with depressed whorl section and single, coarse ribs. Ribs are crossing venter, but there is no bifurcation, which is often present on other genera belonging to Dactylioceratidae. Also, there are no tubercules, which is a thing that differs them from Tokurites.

== Distribution ==
British Columbia, Chile, Hungary, Italy and Morocco
