= Telodactylites =

Telodactylites Temporal range: Toarcian

Scientific classification
- Kingdom: Animalia
- Phylum: Mollusca
- Class: Cephalopoda
- Subclass: †Ammonoidea
- Order: †Ammonitida
- Family: †Dactylioceratidae
- Subfamily: †Nodicoeloceratinae
- Genus: †Telodactylites; Pinna et Levi-Setti, 1971

Type species
- Peronoceras eucosmus Lippi-Boncambi, 1947

Species
- T. eucosmus Lippi-Boncambi, 1947; T. renzi Pinna et Levi-Setti, 1971; T. levisettii Kovacs, 2014; T. achermani Pinna & Levi-Setti, 1971; T. desplacei d'Orbigny, 1844

Genus of molluscs (fossil)

Telodactylites, which is sometimes considered to be a synonym of Porpoceras is genus of ammonite that lived during Toarcian stage (Gradatus ammonite Zone) of early Jurassic. Their fossils were found in Europe, northern Africa and South America. It has probably evolved from Mesodactylites.

== Description ==
Ammonites belonging to this genus have small to medium-sized shells. Coiling is evolute, while whorl section is depressed, subtrapezoidal with oblique flanks and broad and low venter, maximum width is at shoulder. Umbilicus is wide and deep. Sharp, fibulate ribs are dense, tuberculate and spined.
