= Nodicoeloceratinae =

Nodicoeloceratinae Temporal range: Toarcian

Scientific classification
- Kingdom: Animalia
- Phylum: Mollusca
- Class: Cephalopoda
- Subclass: †Ammonoidea
- Order: †Ammonitida
- Family: †Dactylioceratidae
- Subfamily: †Nodicoeloceratinae; Venturi et Ferri, 2001

Extinct subfamily of ammonites

The subfamily Nodicoeloceratinae comprises early Jurassic ammonite genera that lived during early to middle Toarcian stage. Origin of this subfamily is unknown, but first genus Nodicoeloceras has evolved from Dactylioceras (Orthodactylites) or Kedonoceras.

== Validity ==
Sometimes, this taxon is considered to be invalid and is included in Dactylioceratinae. This is not so in the case of scientists that describe Mediterranean faunal province that values phylogenetic, morphological and paleobiogeographical importance of this subfamily.

== Taxonomy ==
Following genera are members of this subfamily:

- Nodicoeloceras Buckman, 1926
- Mesodactylites Pinna et Levi-Setti, 1971
- Transicoeloceras Pinna, 1966
- Telodactylites Pinna et Levi-Setti, 1971
- Collina Bonarelli, 1893
