= Transicoeloceras =

Transicoeloceras Temporal range: Toarcian

Scientific classification
- Kingdom: Animalia
- Phylum: Mollusca
- Class: Cephalopoda
- Subclass: †Ammonoidea
- Order: †Ammonitida
- Family: †Dactylioceratidae
- Subfamily: †Nodicoeloceratinae
- Genus: †Transicoeloceras; Pinna, 1966

Type species
- Transicoeloceras angustum Pinna, 1966

Species
- T. angustum Pinna, 1966; T. viallii Pinna, 1966; T. ramaccionii Pinna, 1966

Genus of molluscs (fossil)

Transicoeloceras, which is sometimes considered to be a synonym of Catacoeloceras is genus of ammonite that lived during Toarcian stage (Bifrons to lower Gradatus ammonite Zones) of early Jurassic. Their fossils were found in Hungary, Italy, France, southern Spain and South America. It has evolved from Mesodactylites.

== Description ==
Ammonites belonging to this genus have small shells. Coiling is involute to sphaerocone. Rounded subtrapezoid whorl section has maximum width at the shoulder. Umbilicus is deep and venter is broad and convex. Fine ribs were simple, or bifurcating and also had tubercules.
