= Mucrodactylites =

Mucrodactylites Temporal range: Toarcian

Scientific classification
- Kingdom: Animalia
- Phylum: Mollusca
- Class: Cephalopoda
- Subclass: †Ammonoidea
- Order: †Ammonitida
- Family: †Dactylioceratidae
- Subfamily: †Dactylioceratinae
- Genus: †Mucrodactylites; Buckman, 1927

Type species
- Ammonites mucronatus d'Orbigny, 1845

Species
- M. mucronatus d'Orbigny, 1845; M. sorguensis Monestier, 1931; M. freboldi Monestier, 1931; M. clapierensis Guex, 1972; M. marioni Lissajous, 1906; M. orientalis (Dagis, 1968); M. contiguum (Dagis, 1968); M. aveyronensis n. sp.(=M. gracile sensu Monestier & Guex)

Genus of molluscs (fossil)

Mucrodactylites, which is sometimes considered to be a synonym of Collina, is genus of ammonite that lived during middle to late Toarcian stage (Bifrons Subzone to lower Variabilis ammonite Zone) of early Jurassic. Their fossils were found in Europe, northern Africa and South America. Species belonging to this genus were probably microconchs of Catacoeloceras. As macroconch of M. mucronatus is considered to be Catacoeloceras raquinianum.

== Description ==
Ammonites belonging to this genus have small, evolute and compressed shells with suboval to subquadrate whorl section. Primary ribs are strong, simple and bifurcating. Secondary ribs are projected.
