= Microdactylites =

Microdactylites Temporal range: Toarcian

Scientific classification
- Kingdom: Animalia
- Phylum: Mollusca
- Class: Cephalopoda
- Subclass: †Ammonoidea
- Order: †Ammonitida
- Family: †Dactylioceratidae
- Subfamily: †Dactylioceratinae
- Genus: †Microdactylites; Buckman, 1926

Type species
- Ammonites attenuatus Simpson, 1855

Species
- M. attenuatus Simpson, 1855; M. tardosensis Kovacs, 2014; M. arcus Buckman, 1926; ?M. gracilis Simpson, 1843; ?M. microdactyliformis Maubeuge, 1957

Genus of molluscs (fossil)

Microdactylites, which is sometimes considered to be a synonym of Dactylioceras, is genus of ammonite that lived during early to middle Toarcian stage (Serpentinum to lower Bifrons ammonite Zones) of early Jurassic. Their fossils were found in England, France, Italy, Germany and Hungary. Species belonging to this genus were microconchs of Dactylioceras.

== Description ==
Ammonites belonging to Microdactylites have small shells with evolute, compressed coiling. Flanks are slightly convex to convex and whorl section is suboval to subcircular. Ribbing is dense, while ribs can be both simple or bifurcating.

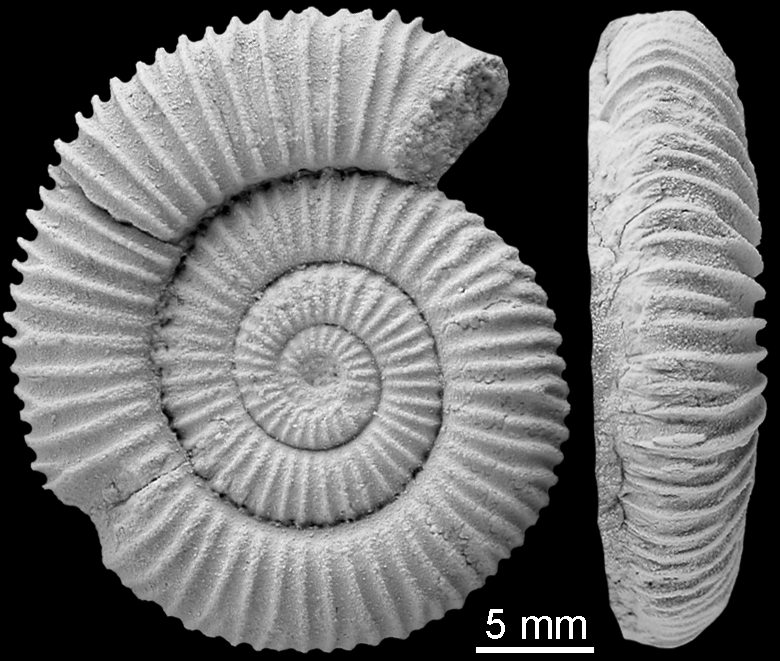
Microdactylites tardosensis Kovács, 2014. Tardos (Gerecse Mts, Hungary), Bánya Hill Section A, Middle Toarcian, Bifrons Zone, lowermost Sublevisoni Subzone
