= Septimaniceras =

Septimaniceras Temporal range: Toarcian

Scientific classification
- Kingdom: Animalia
- Phylum: Mollusca
- Class: Cephalopoda
- Subclass: †Ammonoidea
- Order: †Ammonitida
- Family: †Dactylioceratidae
- Subfamily: †Dactylioceratinae
- Genus: †Septimaniceras; Fauré, 2002

Type species
- Ammonites zitteli Oppel, 1862

Species
- S. zitteli Oppel, 1862; S. nicklesi Guex, 1971; S. pseudoyoungi Guex, 1972

Extinct genus of ammonites

Septimaniceras is genus of ammonites that has probably evolved from Peronoceras and lived during the middle Toarcian stage of early Jurassic. Members of this genus existed from Bifrons Subzone to lower part of Variabilis Subzone. Their fossils were found in France, Hungary and probably also in Austria.

== Description ==
Ammonites belonging to this genus have evolute shells of small size. Inner whorls are cadicone, while outer whorls are subquadrate. On younger whorls, ribs are widely spaced and are of 2 types. Bold ribs have large ventrolateral tubercules, while fine striate ribs exist between them. Later, single and looped ribs with ventrolateral tubercules on later ones are alternating.
