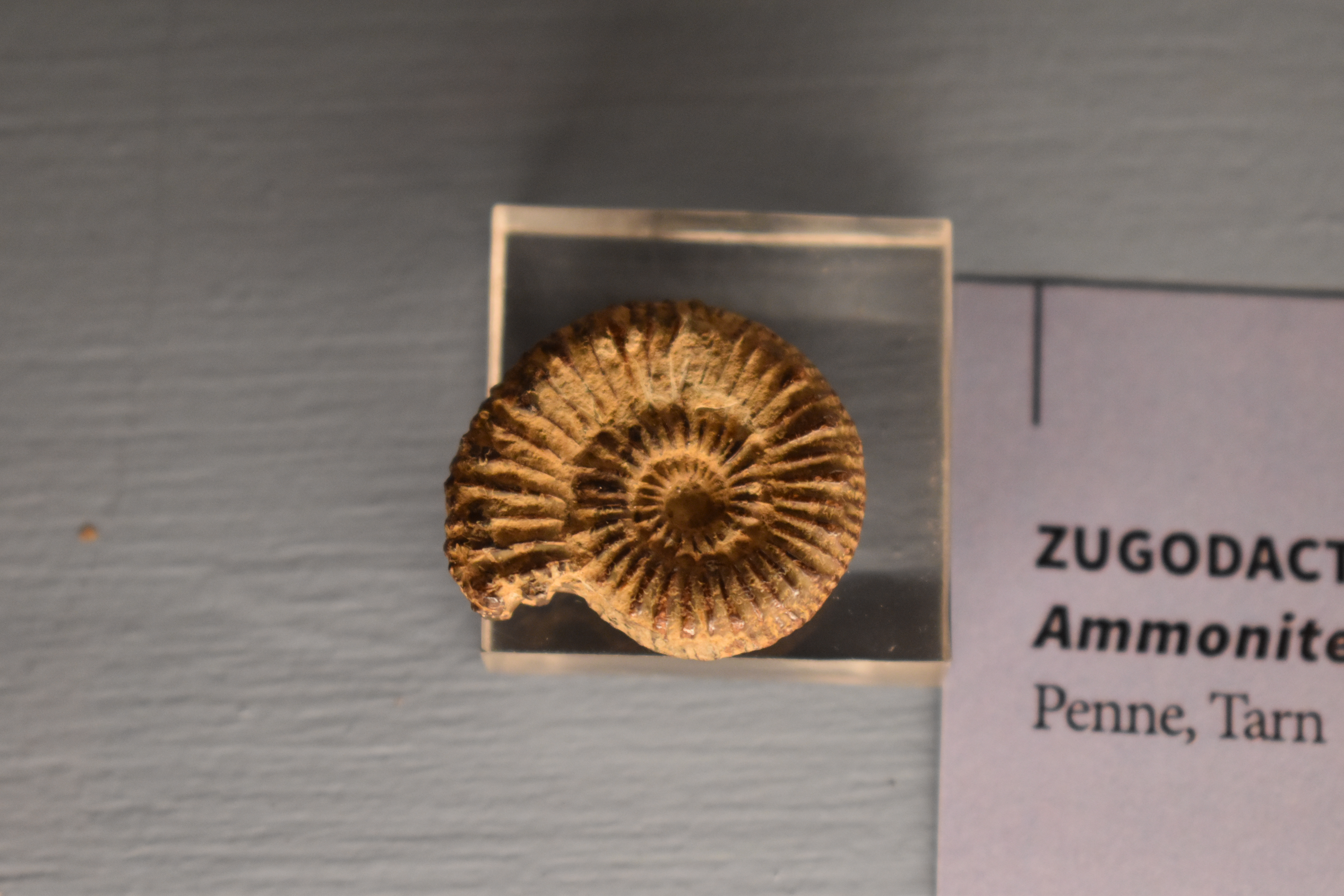

Scientific classification
- Kingdom: Animalia
- Phylum: Mollusca
- Class: Cephalopoda
- Subclass: †Ammonoidea
- Order: †Ammonitida
- Family: †Dactylioceratidae
- Subfamily: †Dactylioceratinae
- Genus: †Zugodactylites; Buckman, 1926

Type species
- Ammonites braunianus d'Orbigny, 1845

Synonyms
- Omolonoceras Dagis, 1967; Gabillytes Guex, 1971

= Zugodactylites =

Zugodactylites Temporal range: Toarcian

Genus of molluscs (fossil)

Zugodactylites is an extinct genus of ammonite cephalopod from the lower Toarcian epoch of the Lower Jurassic, ammonite zone Fibulatum. Its fossils are found in Europe, Russia and Canada.

Whorl section of shells belonging these ammonites were compressed, equidimensional or depressed. Before aperture of adult shell, there has been collar and constriction. Ribs were dense and they were bifurcating at sharp ventrolateral tubercules or spines. There were no fibulate ribs. Sexual dimorphism is known, and Gabillytes, synonym of Zugodactylites were microconchs. They have evolved from finely ribbed Peronoceras.

== See also ==
- List of ammonite genera
