= Bettoniceras =

Bettoniceras Temporal range: Pliensbachian

Scientific classification
- Kingdom: Animalia
- Phylum: Mollusca
- Class: Cephalopoda
- Subclass: †Ammonoidea
- Order: †Ammonitida
- Family: †Dactylioceratidae
- Subfamily: †Reynesocoeloceratinae
- Genus: †Bettoniceras; Wiedenmayer, 1977

Type species
- Coeloceras italicum Fucini, 1900

Species
- B. italicum Fucini, 1900; B. inaequiornatum (Bettoni, 1900); B. colubriforme (Bettoni, 1900)

Extinct genus of ammonites

Bettoniceras is genus of ammonite that lived during the Pliensbachian stage of the early Jurassic. It evolved from Reynesocoeloceras in Davoei ammonite zone and died out during Margaritatus zone. It is possible that Prodactylioceras evolved from this genus. Fossils of this genus have been found in Europe, Morocco, Tunisia, and Chile. Sometimes this genus is not considered valid, but just as a synonym of Prodactylioceras.

== Description ==
Ammonites of this genus had serpenticone planulate shells with mostly single ribs and no tubercules. Whorl section was round. Only difference between Prodactylioceras and Bettoniceras is that latter is missing tubercules.
