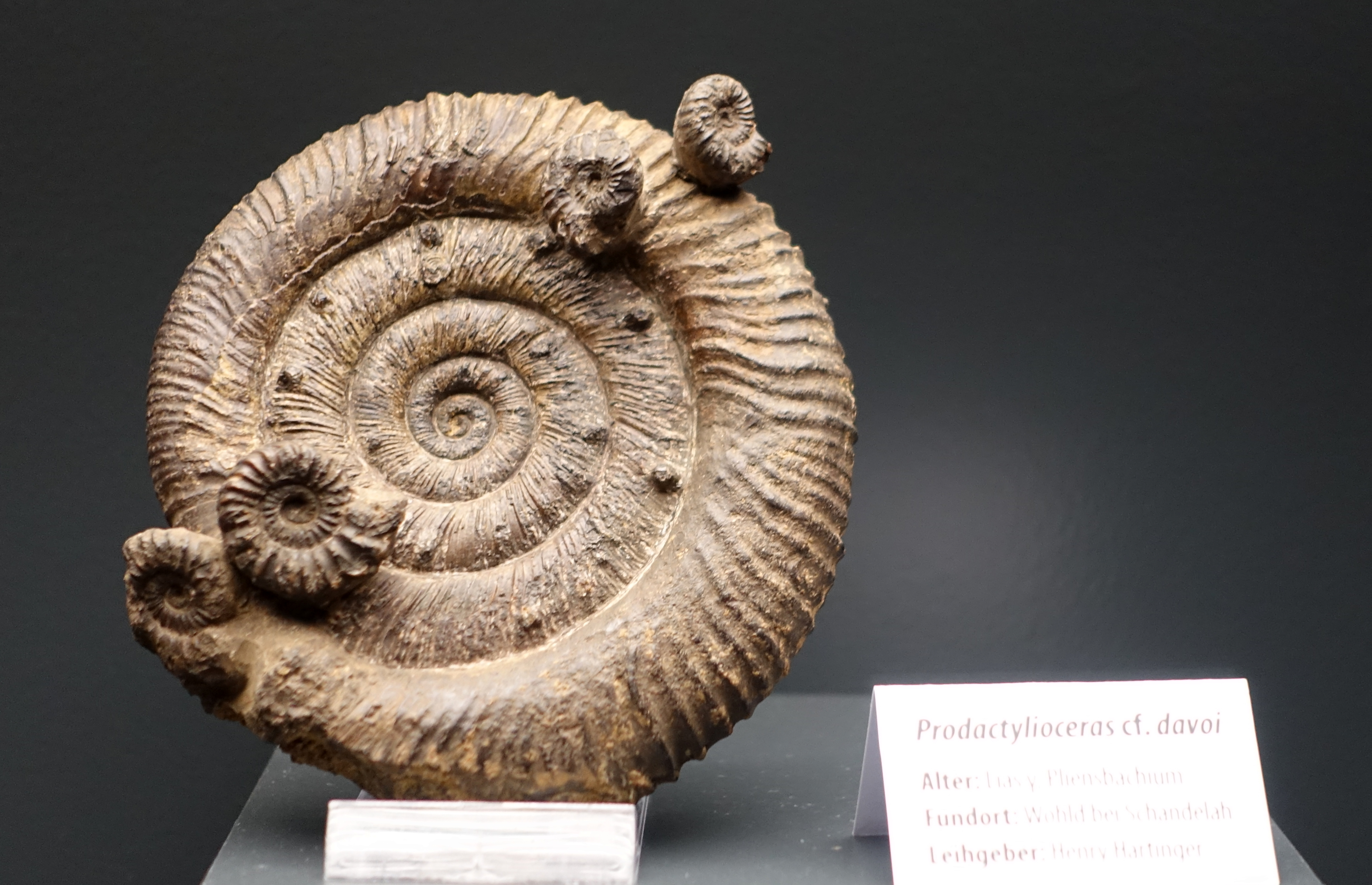
- P. davoei - type species of genus

Scientific classification
- Kingdom: Animalia
- Phylum: Mollusca
- Class: Cephalopoda
- Subclass: †Ammonoidea
- Order: †Ammonitida
- Family: †Dactylioceratidae
- Subfamily: †Reynesocoeloceratinae
- Genus: †Prodactylioceras; Spath, 1923

Type species
- Ammonites davoei Sowerby, 1822

Species
- P. davoei Sowerby, 1822; P. nodosissimum Quenstedt, 1885; P. italicum Meneghini et Fucini, 1900; P. colubriforme Bettoni, 1900; P. rectiradiatum Wingrave, 1916; P. aurigeriense Dommergues et al., 1984; P. ausonicum Fucini, 1900; P. westgatenses Caruthers et al., 2018

Synonyms
- Paralytoceras Frebold, 1922; not Paralytoceras Frech, 1902; Praedactylioceras Frentzen, 1937

= Prodactylioceras =

Prodactylioceras Temporal range: Pliensbachian

Extinct genus of ammonites

Prodactylioceras is genus of ammonite that lived during the Pliensbachian stage of early Jurassic. It has evolved from Reynesocoeloceras, but maybe not directly, but through Bettoniceras. Its fossils were found in Europe, Asia and North America.

While sometimes, genus Bettoniceras, which differs from Prodactylioceras only by lacking tubercules is considered valid, in other cases it is considered to be a synonym of this genus. Species as P. italicum, or P. colubriforme would not be in that case belonging to this genus, as they are members of genus Bettoniceras.

== Description ==
Ammonites of this genus had evolute shells, with circular to slightly depressed whorl section. In compressed species, ribs were fine and often prorsiradiate and they were wearing ventrolateral tubercules. In depressed species, ribs are coarser and swollen, while ventrolateral tubercules are larger.
