= Nodicoeloceras =

Nodicoeloceras Temporal range: Toarcian

Scientific classification
- Kingdom: Animalia
- Phylum: Mollusca
- Class: Cephalopoda
- Subclass: †Ammonoidea
- Order: †Ammonitida
- Family: †Dactylioceratidae
- Subfamily: †Dactylioceratinae
- Genus: †Nodicoeloceras; Buckman, 1923

Type species
- Ammonites crassoides Simpson, 1855

Species
- N. angelonii Ramaccioni, 1939; N. choffati Renz, 1912; N. crassoides Simpson, 1855; N. crateriforme Monestier in Guex, 1972; N. dayi Reynes, 1868; N. dulaii Kovács, 2014; N. fontis Guex, 1972; N. lobatum Buckman, 1927; N. middlegatense Caruthers et al., 2018; N. nevadaense Caruthers et al., 2018; N. tuberculatum Kottek, 1966

Synonyms
- Crassicoeloceras Buckman, 1926; Lobodactylites Buckman, 1926; Multicoeloceras Buckman, 1926; Spinicoeloceras Buckman, 1926; Mesodactylites Pinna & Levi-Setti, 1971; Fibulocoeloceras Venturi & Ferri, 2001

Extinct genus of ammonites

Nodicoeloceras is genus of ammonite that lived during early to middle Toarcian stage of early Jurassic. Members of this genus existed from Exaratum Subzone of Falciferum Zone to Commune subzone of Bifrons Zone. Their fossils were found in Europe, northern Africa, Asia, North America and South America. It has probably evolved from Dactylioceras (Orthodactylites) or Kedonoceras and gave rise to Mesodactylites.

== Description ==
Ammonites belonging to this genus have moderately evolute to cadicone shells. Whorl section is characterized by depressed whorls with convex flanks and low venter. Ribs are bifurcating at the position of ventrolateral shoulder, where tubercules, or spines are mostly present.

== Synonyms ==
While Mesodactylites and Fibulocoeloceras are sometimes considered to be just synonyms of Nodicoeloceras, other times they are considered to be a valid genera.
