= Euryophiurida =

Euryophiurida Temporal range: 469.4–0 Ma Middle Ordovician to Present

Scientific classification
- Kingdom: Animalia
- Phylum: Echinodermata
- Class: Ophiuroidea
- Infraclass: Metophiurida
- Superorder: Euryophiurida; O'Hara, Hugall, Thuy, Stöhr & Martynov, 2017

Orders
- Euryalida; Ophiurida

Order of brittle stars

Euryophiurida is one of the two superorders of echinoderms belonging to the class Ophiuroidea. It is the older of the superorders and contains two orders, Euryalida and Ophiurida.

The earliest fossil from this superorder (Ophiurida - Protaster†) dates back to the Darriwilian in the Middle Ordovician. (Note: The genus is listed under Oegophiurida but has since been moved to Euryophiurida.)
