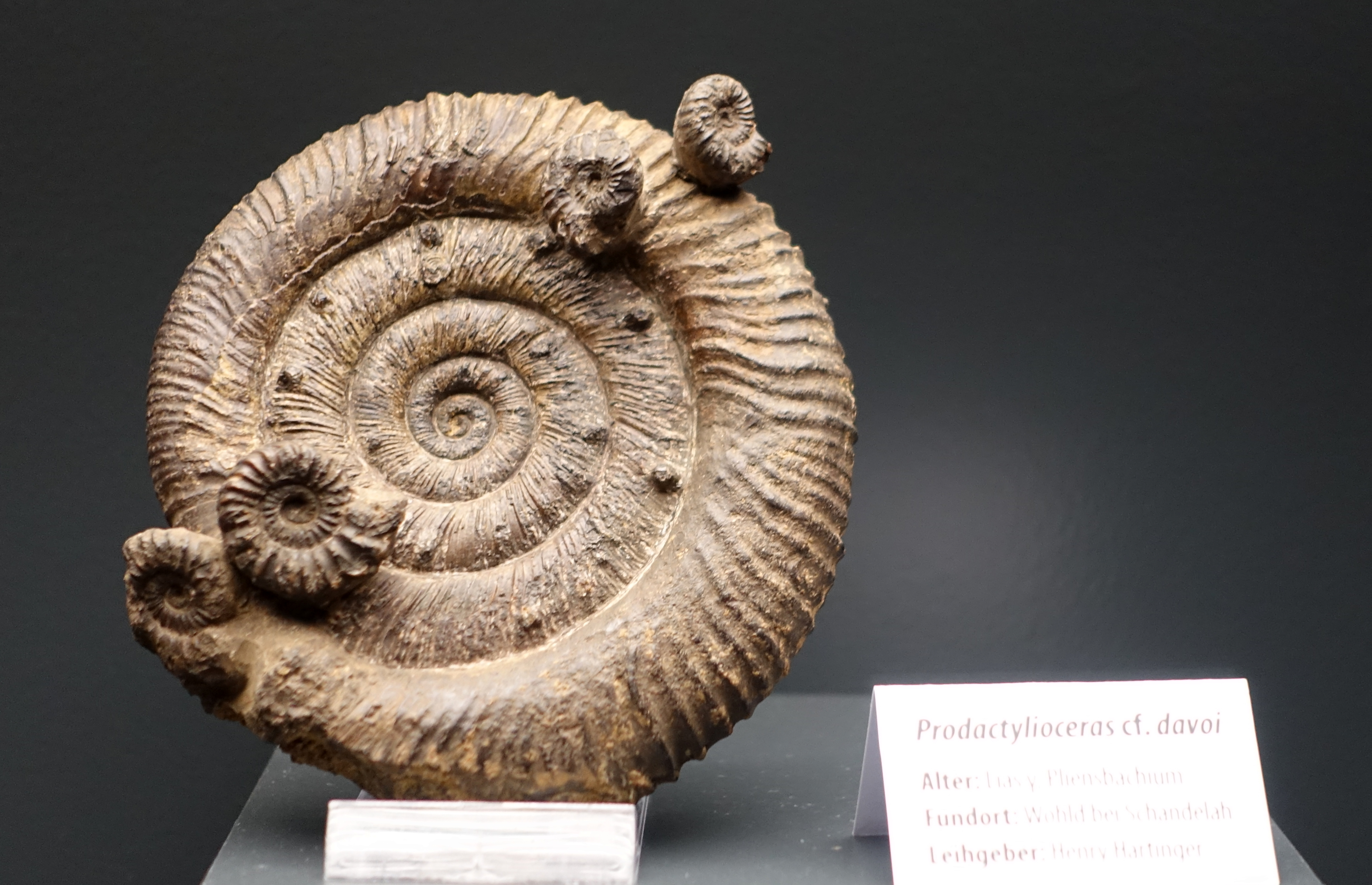
- Prodactylioceras cf. davoei

Scientific classification
- Kingdom: Animalia
- Phylum: Mollusca
- Class: Cephalopoda
- Subclass: †Ammonoidea
- Order: †Ammonitida
- Family: †Dactylioceratidae
- Subfamily: †Reynesocoeloceratinae; Dommergues, 1986

= Reynesocoeloceratinae =

Reynesocoeloceratinae Temporal range: Pliensbachian

Extinct subfamily of ammonites

The subfamily Reynesocoeloceratinae comprises early Jurassic ammonite genera that lived during Pliensbachian stage. These dactylioceratids existed from Ibex ammonite zone and died out in Spinatum zone. They have evolved from Metaderoceras and gave rise to subfamily Dactylioceratinae.

== Description ==
Ammonites with depressed, cadicone, or even evolute, serpenticone shells. Tubercules might be present. Ribs can be both single, or bifurcating. Some members of this subfamily show size dimorphism. They differs from Dactylioceratinae by suture. While Reynesocoeloceratinae has on dorsal side of external lobe two major secondary lobes, this is not so in Dactylioceratinae, as there is external saddle not divided, while lateral lobe is strongly trifid.

== Taxonomy ==
- Reynesocoeloceratinae Dommergues, 1986
  - Reynesocoeloceras Géczy, 1976
  - Bettoniceras Wiedenmayer, 1977
  - Prodactylioceras Spath, 1923
  - Cetonoceras Wiedenmayer, 1977
