= Metophiurida =

Metophiurida Temporal range: Early Ordovician–Present

Scientific classification
- Kingdom: Animalia
- Phylum: Echinodermata
- Class: Ophiuroidea
- Subclass: Myophiuroida
- Infraclass: Metophiurida; Matsumoto, 1913

Superorders
- Euryophiurida; Ophintegrida

Order of brittle stars

Metophiurida is an infraclass of echinoderms belonging to the class Ophiuroidea. It contains two superorders, Euryophiurida and Ophintegrida.
