= Cetonoceras =

Cetonoceras Temporal range: Pliensbachian

Scientific classification
- Kingdom: Animalia
- Phylum: Mollusca
- Class: Cephalopoda
- Subclass: †Ammonoidea
- Order: †Ammonitida
- Family: †Dactylioceratidae
- Subfamily: †Reynesocoeloceratinae
- Genus: †Cetonoceras; Wiedenmayer, 1977

Type species
- Coeloceras psiloceroides Fucini, 1905

Species
- C. psiloceroides Fucini, 1905

Synonyms
- Seccianoceras Venturi in Faraoni et al., 1995

Genus of molluscs (fossil)

Cetonoceras is genus of ammonite that lived during the upper Pliensbachian stage of early Jurassic. Fossils of this genus were found in Italy, France, Spain, Portugal, Hungary and Austria.

== Description ==
First whorls of shell are depressed, but then they became rounded and more compressed. Primary ribs are strong and they are usually bifurcating. Secondary ribs are more delicate. Tubercules are present on ventrolateral positions in younger whorls, but they are diminishing on outer whorls. Similar genus is Reynesocoeloceras, but that one is lacking ribs bifurcations.
