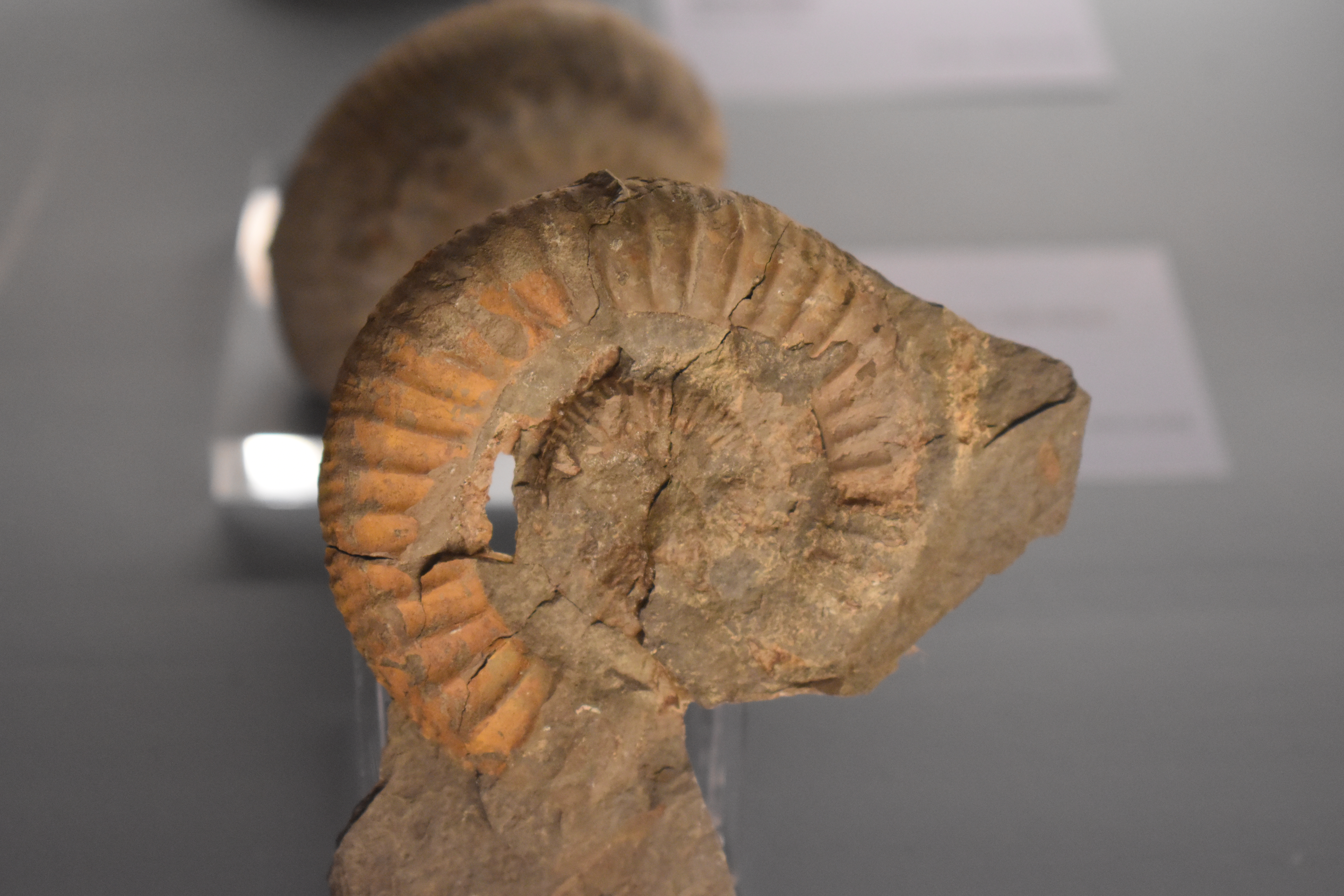
- Catacoeloceras dumortieri.

Scientific classification
- Kingdom: Animalia
- Phylum: Mollusca
- Class: Cephalopoda
- Subclass: †Ammonoidea
- Order: †Ammonitida
- Family: †Dactylioceratidae
- Subfamily: †Dactylioceratinae
- Genus: †Catacoeloceras; Hyatt, 1867

Type species
- Catacoeloceras confectum Buckman, 1923

Species
- C. confectum Buckman, 1923; C. dumortieri de Brun, 1932; C. raquinianum d'Orbigny, 1844; C. crassum Young & Bird, 1828; C. engeli Monestier, 1931; C. jordani Guex, 1972; C. becaudi Rulleau & Lacroix, 2013; C. densicostatum (Schmidt-Effing, 1972); C. puteolum (Simpson, 1855); ?C. manifestum (Dagis, 1967); ?C. proprium (Dagis, 1967); ?C. prinzi (Géczy, 1967); ?C. grangei Stevens, 2008

Synonyms
- Omolonoceras Dagis, 1967

= Catacoeloceras =

Catacoeloceras Temporal range: Toarcian

Extinct genus of ammonites

Catacoeloceras is a genus of ammonite that lived during Middle Toarcian stage of early Jurassic. Members of this genus existed from the Bifrons Subzone of the Bifrons Zone to the Variabilis Zone. Their fossils have been found in Europe, northern Africa, Asia, North America and South America. It is believed to have evolved from Porpoceras.

== Description ==
Ammonites belonging to this genus have cadicone shells with depressed, rounded whorl section. Some species have almost spheroconic shells and these ones were designated as genus Transicoeloceras. Transicoeloceras is now considered a synonym of Catacoeloceras by some authors, although others still regard it as a valid genus. The ribs on these shells can be either simple or bifurcating. Most species display ventrolateral tubercules and the venter between these tubercles on the body chamber is often smooth and flat. A constriction is present near the mouth border. The genus also exhibits size dimorphism. Genus Mucrodactylites is considered to be a microconch.
