= Porpoceras =

Porpoceras Temporal range: Toarcian

Scientific classification
- Kingdom: Animalia
- Phylum: Mollusca
- Class: Cephalopoda
- Subclass: †Ammonoidea
- Order: †Ammonitida
- Family: †Dactylioceratidae
- Subfamily: †Dactylioceratinae
- Genus: †Porpoceras; Buckman, 1911

Type species
- Ammonites vortex Simpson, 1855

Species
- P. vortex (Simpson, 1855); P. verticosum (Simpson, 1855); P. vorticellum (Simpson, 1855); P. polare Frebold, 1929; P. spinatum Frebold, 1958; P. gigas Guex, 1973; P. planiventer Guex, 1972; P. pseudodesplacei Guex, 1972; P. crassicostatum Guex, 1972; P. beurleni Monestier, 1931; P. tenellissimum Monestier, 1931; P. acanthopsis (D'Orbigny, 1850)

Synonyms
- Telodactylites Pinna & Levi-Setti, 1971; Platystrophites Levi-Setti & Pinna, 1971

Extinct genus of ammonites

Porpoceras is genus of ammonite that lived during the early and middle Toarcian stage of early Jurassic. Members of this genus existed from uppermost part of the Harpoceras serpentinum zone to the Haugia variabilis zone. Their fossils were found in Europe, Asia, North America and South America.

== Description ==
Ammonites belonging to this genus have evolute shells, with compressed to depressed whorl section. Flanks were slightly convex and venter has been low. Whorl section is subrectangular. Prorsiradiate ribs are strong and fibulate on inner whorls and tuberculate to spined on the place of ventrolateral shoulder. It differs from Peronoceras by not having compressed whorl section and regular fibulation. Catacoeloceras is also similar, but it has regular ventrolateral tubercules and is missing fibulation.
