= Tokurites =

Tokurites Temporal range: Toarcian

Scientific classification
- Kingdom: Animalia
- Phylum: Mollusca
- Class: Cephalopoda
- Subclass: †Ammonoidea
- Order: †Ammonitida
- Family: †Dactylioceratidae
- Subfamily: †Dactylioceratinae
- Genus: †Tokurites; Repin, 2016

Type species
- Tokurites inopinatus Repin, 2016

Extinct genus of ammonites

Tokurites is a monospecific genus of ammonite that lived during the Toarcian stage of early Jurassic, ammonite zone of Zugodactylites braunianus. Its shell has ribs, which cross the ventral part of the shell creating pricky tubercules there. By these tubercules, it differs from any other member of Dactylioceratidae. This genus is closely related to genus Reynesoceras. The genus is based on the single specimen with diameter of 15 mm and thus consist from only one species Tokurites inopinatus. This is the only specimen that has been found in the Asian part of Russia.
