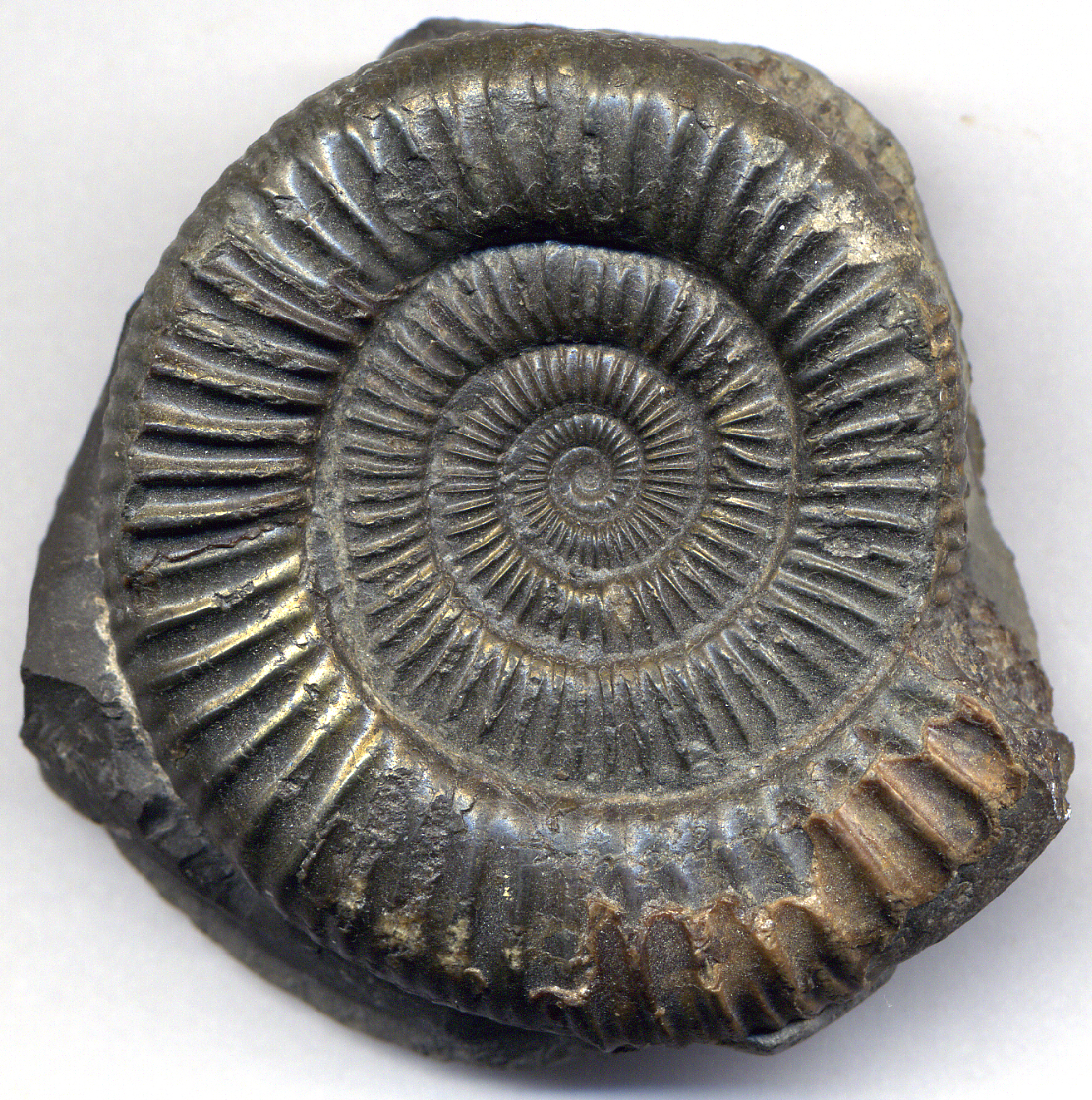
- Dactylioceras commune

Scientific classification
- Kingdom: Animalia
- Phylum: Mollusca
- Class: Cephalopoda
- Subclass: †Ammonoidea
- Order: †Ammonitida
- Family: †Dactylioceratidae
- Subfamily: †Dactylioceratinae; Hyatt, 1867

Synonyms
- Dactyloidae Hyatt, 1867; Kedocertinae Dagis, 1968; Mesodactylioceratinae Pinna & Levi-Setti, 1971; Reynesoceratinae Wiedenmayer, 1977; Nodicoeloceratinae Venturi & Ferri, 2001

= Dactylioceratinae =

Dactylioceratinae Temporal range: Pliensbachian–Toarcian

Extinct subfamily of ammonites

The subfamily Dactylioceratinae comprises early Jurassic ammonite genera that lived during Upper Pliensbachian to Upper Toarcian stage. These dactylioceratids existed from Margaritatus ammonite Zone, when they have evolved from Reynesocoeloceratinae and died out in Variabilis Zone without leaving any descendants.

== Description ==
While ribs can be single, they are mostly bifurcating at ventrolateral edge and in some genera, even fibulation (primary ribs are joining at ventrolateral tubercules) can exist. Tubercules might also be present at ventrolateral edge, but not in all species. Final aperture is contracted. Size dimorphism is common.

== Taxonomy ==
Taxonomic composition of this subfamily differs among literature. Well known is taxonomy according to Treatise on Invertebrate Paleontology, which is shown below with addition of Tokurites, which has not been known in the time, when current edition of Treatise has been published.

- Reynesoceras Spath, 1936
- Dactylioceras Hyatt, 1867
  - D. (Dactylioceras) Hyatt, 1867
  - D. (Orthodactylites) Buckman, 1926
  - D. (Iranodactylites) Repin, 2000
  - D. (Eodactylites) Schmidt-Effing, 1972
- Nodicoeloceras Buckman, 1926
- Peronoceras Hyatt, 1867
- Zugodactylites Buckman, 1926
- Porpoceras Buckman, 1911
- Septimaniceras Fauré, 2002
- Catacoeloceras Buckman, 1923
- Collina Bonarelli, 1893
- Tokurites Repin, 2016

Some scholars consider Nodicoeloceratinae as valid taxon and not as synonym of Dactylioceratinae. In their view, some of aforementioned genera does not belong to Dactylioceratinae. These are Nodicoeloceras, Collina and some genera, which are by other scholars considered to be synonyms with Nodicoeloceras, Catacoeloceras and Porpoceras. On the other hand, these scientists increase number of dactylioceratine genera by considering Microdactylites and Mucrodactylites as valid.
