= Myophiuroida =

Myophiuroida Temporal range: Early Ordovician–Present

Scientific classification
- Kingdom: Animalia
- Phylum: Echinodermata
- Class: Ophiuroidea
- Subclass: Myophiuroida; Matsumoto, 1915

Infraclass
- Metophiurida

Order of brittle stars

Myophiuroida is a subclass of echinoderms belonging to the class Ophiuroidea. It contains an infraclass, Metophiurida.
