= Mesodactylites =

Mesodactylites Temporal range: Toarcian

Scientific classification
- Kingdom: Animalia
- Phylum: Mollusca
- Class: Cephalopoda
- Subclass: †Ammonoidea
- Order: †Ammonitida
- Family: †Dactylioceratidae
- Subfamily: †Nodicoeloceratinae
- Genus: †Mesodactylites; Pinna et Levi-Setti, 1971

Type species
- Coeloceras annulatiforme Bonarelli, 1899

Species
- M. annulatiformis Bonarelli, 1899; M. mediterraneus Renz, 1912; M. broilii Mitzopoulos, 1930; M. sapphicus Renz, 1912; M. merlai Pinna, 1969; M. pisznicenzis Kovacs, 2014

Genus of molluscs (fossil)

Mesodactylites, which is sometimes considered to be a synonym of Nodicoeloceras is genus of ammonite that lived during early to middle Toarcian stage (Serpentinum to Bifrons ammonite Zones) of early Jurassic. Their fossils were found in southern and central Europe and northern Africa. It has evolved from Nodicoeloceras.

== Description ==
Ammonites belonging to this genus have small to medium-sized shells. Coiling is cadicone to moderately evolute. Subcircular whorl section has convex flanks and rounded venter. Ribs can be simple or bifurcating. On ventrolateral position, there are tubercules, mostly on phragmocone.
