= Peronoceras =

Peronoceras Temporal range: Toarcian

Scientific classification
- Kingdom: Animalia
- Phylum: Mollusca
- Class: Cephalopoda
- Subclass: †Ammonoidea
- Order: †Ammonitida
- Family: †Dactylioceratidae
- Subfamily: †Dactylioceratinae
- Genus: †Peronoceras; Hyatt, 1867

Type species
- Ammonites fibulatus Sowerby, 1823

Species
- P. fibulatum Sowerby, 1823; P. turriculatum Simpson, 1855; P. pacificum Hilldebrandt, 1981

Extinct genus of ammonites

Peronoceras is genus of ammonite that lived during the middle Toarcian stage of early Jurassic. Members of this genus existed only in Fibulatum Subzone of Bifrons Zone. Their fossils were found in Europe, northern Africa, Asia, North America and South America.

== Description ==
Form of their shell could range from depressed cadicone to compressed ellipsocone. Whorl section is quadrangular and has flat sides and venter. Ribs are present and they are fine to distant. They were always fibulate with the exception of inner whorls of finely ribbed species. On ventrolateral position, there were tubercules.
