= Collina (ammonite) =

Collina Temporal range: Toarcian

Scientific classification
- Kingdom: Animalia
- Phylum: Mollusca
- Class: Cephalopoda
- Subclass: †Ammonoidea
- Order: †Ammonitida
- Family: †Dactylioceratidae
- Subfamily: †Dactylioceratinae
- Genus: †Collina; Hyatt, 1867

Type species
- Collina gemma Buckman, 1927

Species
- C. gemma Buckman, 1927; C. kampemorpha Kottek, 1966

Synonyms
- Mucrodactylites Buckman, 1927; Collinites Bonarelli, 1899

Extinct genus of ammonites

Collina is genus of ammonite that lived during lower to upper Toarcian stage of early Jurassic. Members of this genus existed from Braunianus Subzone to Variabilis Zone. Their fossils were found in Europe, Asia, North America and South America. It has evolved from Mesodactylites.

== Description ==
Whorl section is angular quadrate. Distant ribs can be bifurcating or trifurcating on the place of high ventrolateral tubercules. Secondary ribs are bent strongly forward and raised in the middle part of the venter. Size dimorphism is present in the case of this genus.
