= Reynesocoeloceras =

Reynesocoeloceras Temporal range: Pliensbachian

Scientific classification
- Kingdom: Animalia
- Phylum: Mollusca
- Class: Cephalopoda
- Subclass: †Ammonoidea
- Order: †Ammonitida
- Family: †Dactylioceratidae
- Subfamily: †Reynesocoeloceratinae
- Genus: †Reynesocoeloceras; Géczy, 1976

Type species
- Ammonites (Stephanoceras) crassus Young & Bird, 1828 var. indunense Meneghini, 1874

Species
- R. indunense Meneghini, 1874; R. levicosta Fucinii, 1905; R. corvalani Caruthers et al., 2018; R. elmii Dommergues et al., 2011; R. fallax Fucini, 1905; R. grahami Smith and Tipper, 1996; R. incertum Fucini 1905; R. obesum Fucini, 1905; R. praeincertum Dommergues and Mouterde, 1982; R. simulans Fucini, 1905

Synonyms
- Indunoceras Wiedenmayer, 1977

Extinct genus of ammonites

Reynesocoeloceras is genus of ammonite that lived during the lower Pliensbachian stage of early Jurassic, ammonite zones Ibex—Davoei.

== Distribution ==
Fossils of this genus are found in Europe, North America, South America and north Africa.

== Description ==
Shells of ammonites belonging to this genera had evolute cadicone whorls with depressed section. Venter has been flat. Ribs were usually single. On the ventrolateral tubercules, which could have been small, or even large, there might have been bifurcation of ribs.
