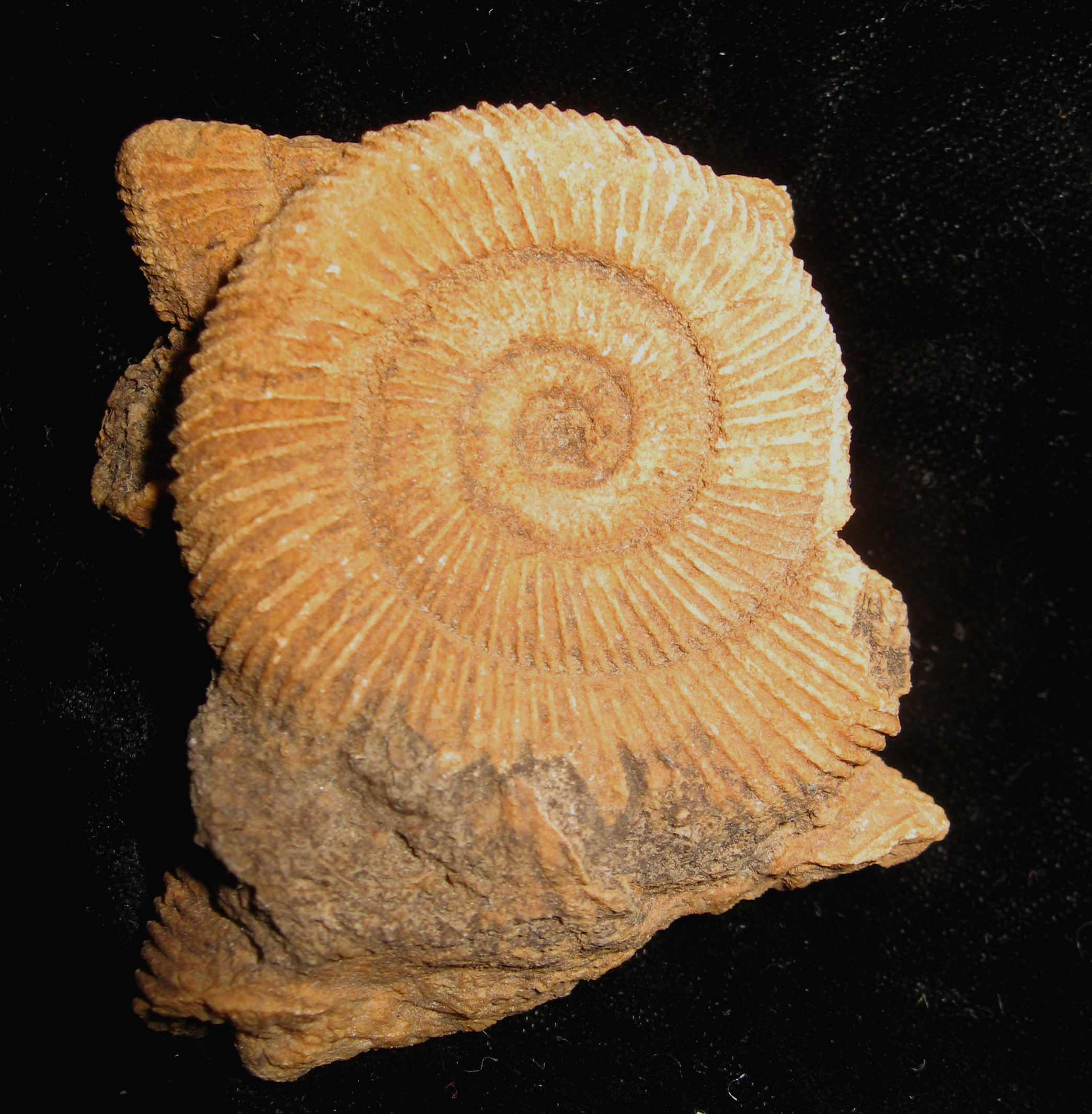
- Dactylioceras (Dactylioceras) athleticum

Scientific classification
- Kingdom: Animalia
- Phylum: Mollusca
- Class: Cephalopoda
- Subclass: †Ammonoidea
- Order: †Ammonitida
- Family: †Dactylioceratidae
- Subfamily: †Dactylioceratinae
- Genus: †Dactylioceras; Hyatt, 1867

Subgenera and Species
- See text

= Dactylioceras =

Dactylioceras Temporal range: Pliensbachian–Toarcian

Genus of molluscs (fossil)

Dactylioceras was a widespread genus of ammonites from the Lower Jurassic period, approximately 180 million years ago (mya).Like many other ammonites, the genus Dactylioceras is extremely important in biostratigraphy, being a key index fossil for identifying their region of the Jurassic. It had a nearly cosmopolitan distribution during the time it existed.

== Etymology ==
The name Dactylioceras comes from the Greek dactyl, meaning “finger”, and keras, meaning "horn" and refers to the shell's branching ribs.

== Description ==
Dactylioceras are generally small, averaging 65 millimetres (2.6 in) in diameter. They have a strong, ribbed shell. The ribs are slightly inclined forward, running over the outer edge, and either simple or forking at outer end. Though they eventually died out 180 mya, their style of ribbing occurs in numerous ammonite genera until the whole group became extinct 66 million years ago with the dinosaurs.

== Ecology ==
Dactylioceras probably lived by scavenging on the sea floor. Mass mortality specimens of Dactylioceras are common, and perhaps suggest that these ammonites may often have died shortly after spawning. The dead shells were probably gently washed up into a shell bank on the margins of the Lower Jurassic seas. Flow tank experiments show that Dactylioceras was probably a slow swimmer. It was likely prey for larger marine animals at the time including several belemnites.

== Distribution ==
Dactylioceras has been collected from almost every continent, and was one of the most successful ammonite lineages ever. They are abundant throughout Europe, with exceptionally fine specimens found in England and Germany.

== Subgenera ==
Currently, 3 or 4 subgenera are considered to be valid. Number differs on authors opinions.

- D. (Dactylioceras) Hyatt, 1867: type species: Ammonites communis Sowerby, 1815
- D. (Orthodactylites) Buckman, 1926: type species: Dactylioceras directus Buckman, 1926
- D. (Iranodactylites) Repin, 2000: type species: Dactylioceras (Iranodactylites) ketevanae Repin, 2000
- D. (Eodactylites) Schmidt-Effing, 1972: type species: Dactylioceras pseudocommune Fucini, 1935. This subgenus is not recognized by some authors, while some other prefer to maintain it.

== Species ==
Species within the genus Dactylioceras include:

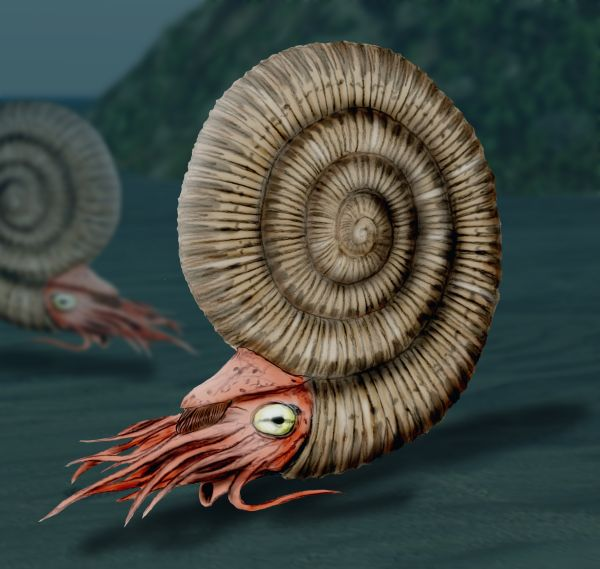
Digital artist's recreation

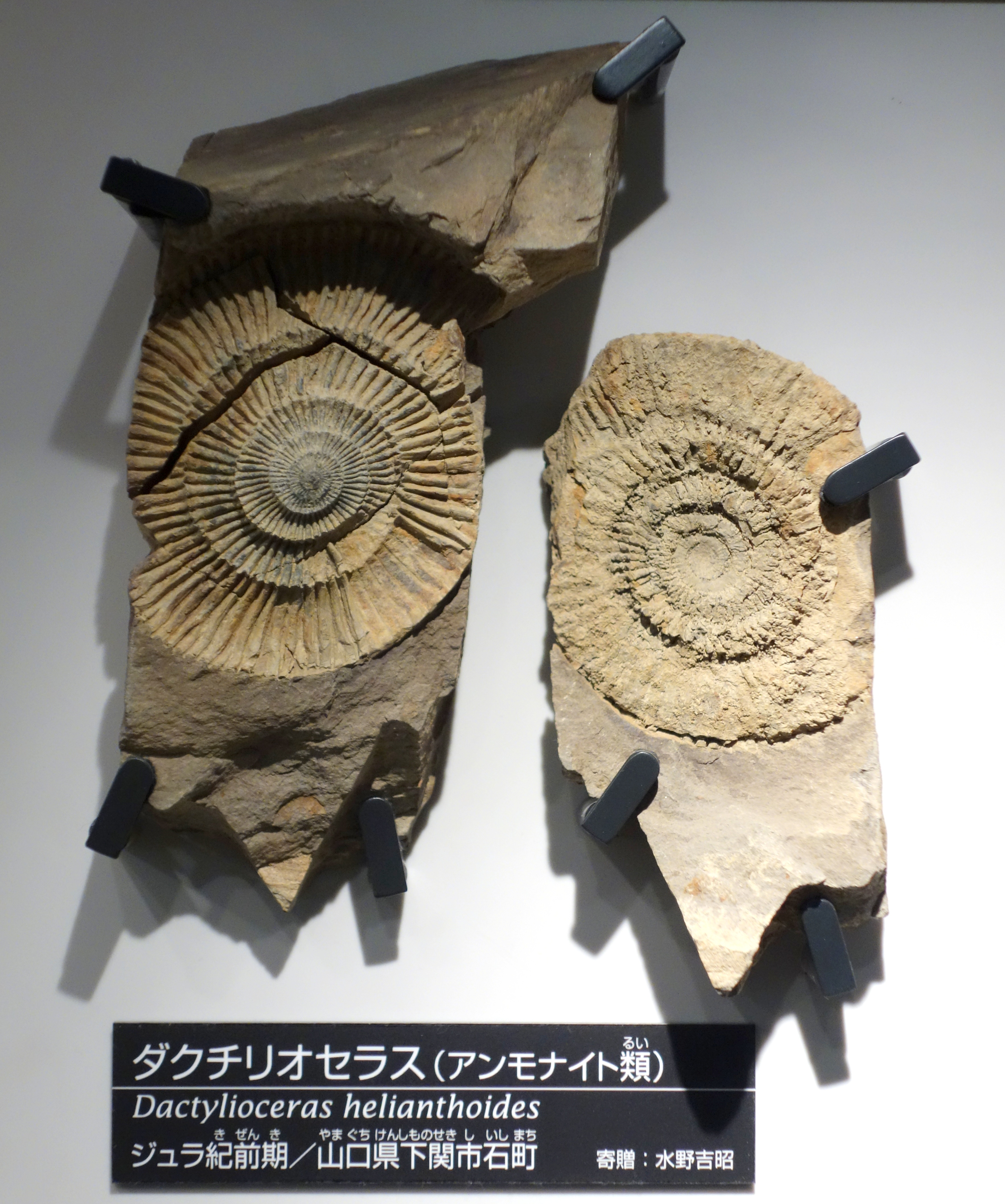
Dactylioceras (Orthodactylites) helianthoides

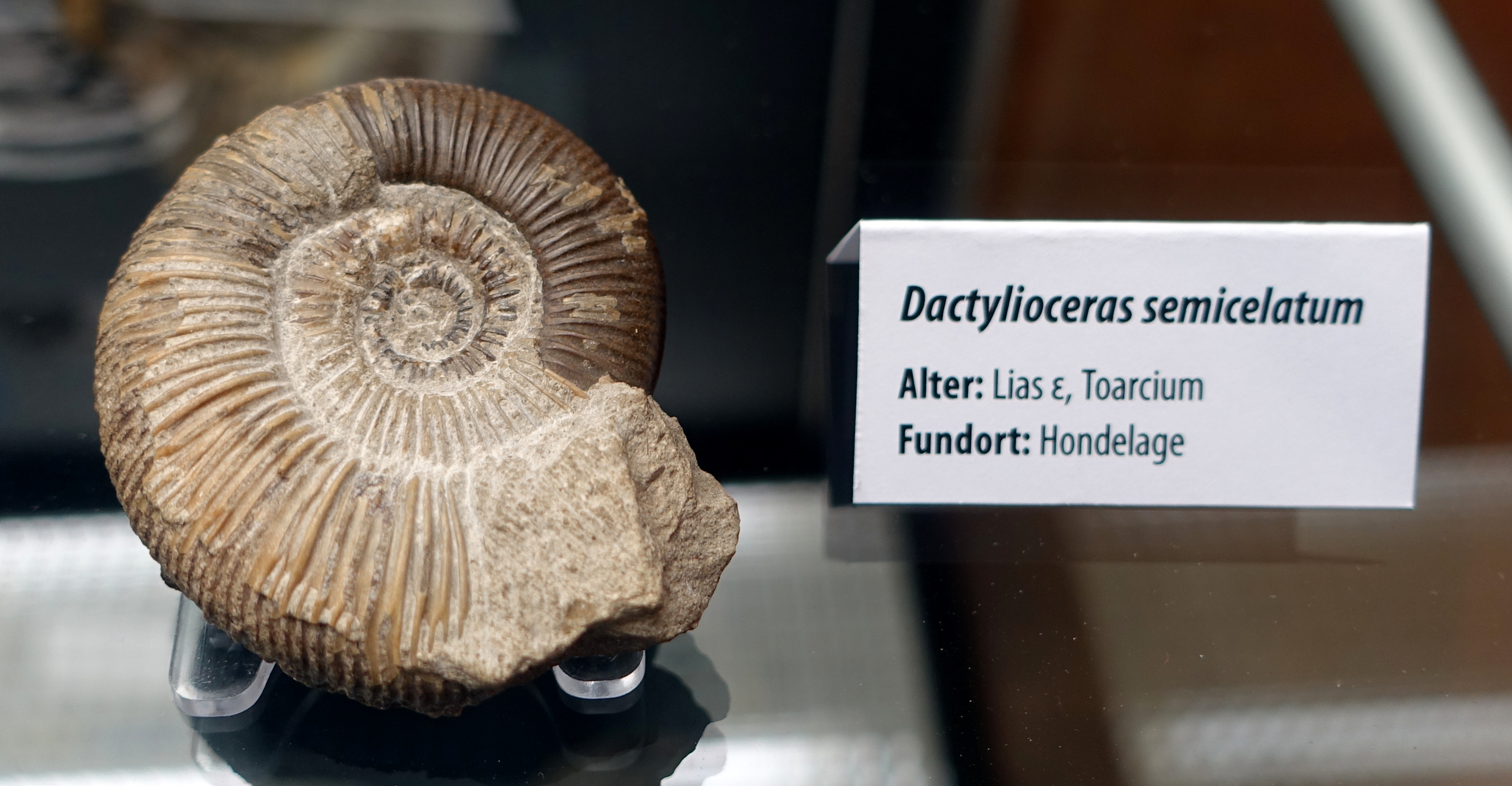
Dactylioceras (Orthodactylites) semicelatum

- D. (O.) aequistriatum Zieten, 1830
- D. (D.) alpestre Wiedenmayer, 1980
- D. (D.) amplum Dagis, 1968
- D. (O.) andaluciensis Jiménes & Rivas, 1991
- D. (O.) anguiforme Buckman, 1928
- D. (O.) anguinum Reinecke, 1818
- D. (D.) annuliferum Simpson, 1855
- D. (D.) arcus Buckman, 1926
- D. (D.) athleticum Simpson, 1855
- D. (D.) attenuatum Simpson, 1855
- D. (O.) chilense Hillebrandt and Schmidt-Effing, 1981
- D. (O.) clevelandicum Howarth, 1973
- D. (D.) commune Sowerby, 1815
- D. (D.) comptum Dagis, 1968
- D. (D.) consimile Buckman, 1926
- D. (D.) crassescens Simpson, 1855
- D. (O.) crassifactum Simpson, 1855
- D. (O.) crassiusculosum Buckman, 1912
- D. (D.) crassiusculum Simpson, 1855
- D. (D.) crassulum Buckman, 1921
- D. (D.) crosbeyi Simpson, 1843
- D. (O.) directum Buckman, 1926
- D. (O.) ernsti Lehmann, 1968
- D. (D.) gracile Simpson, 1843
- D. (O.) helianthoides Yokoyama, 1904
- D. (O.) hispansum Schmidt-Effing, 1972
- D. (O.) hoelderi Hillebrandt & Schmidt-Effing, 1981
- D. (D.) holandrei d'Orbigny, 1845
- D. (O.) ketevanae Repin, 2000
- D. (O.) kanense McLearn, 1930
- D. (I.) ketevanae Repin, 2000
- D. (D.) laticostatum Bardin et al., 2014
- D. (O.) marioni Lissajous, 1906
- D. (E.) mirabile Fucini, 1935
- D. (D.) mite Buckman, 1927
- D. (D.) peloritanum Fucini, 1935
- D. (D.) percostatum Fucini, 1935
- D. (D.) perplicatum Fucini, 1935
- D. (E.) polymorphum Fucini, 1935
- D. (D.) praepositum Buckman, 1927
- D. (E.) pseudocommune Fucini, 1935
- D. (D.) pseudocrassoides Maubeuge, 1957
- D. (O.) sapunovi Repin, 2000
- D. (O.) semiannulatum Howarth, 1978
- D. (O.) semicelatum Simpson, 1843
- D. (E.) simplex Fucini, 1935
- D. (D.) stresherense Sapunov, 1963
- D. (D.) subholandrei Fucini, 1935
- D. (D.) suntarense Krimholz, 1957
- D. (D.) tardosensis Kovács, 2014
- D. (D.) tauromenense Fucini, 1935
- D. (D.) temperatum Buckman, 1927
- D. (O.) tenuicostatum Young & Bird, 1822
- D. (O.) toxophorum Buckman, 1926
- D. (D.) triangulum Fischer, 1966
- D. (D.) vermis Simpson, 1855
- D. (O.) wunnenbergi Hoffmann, 1968

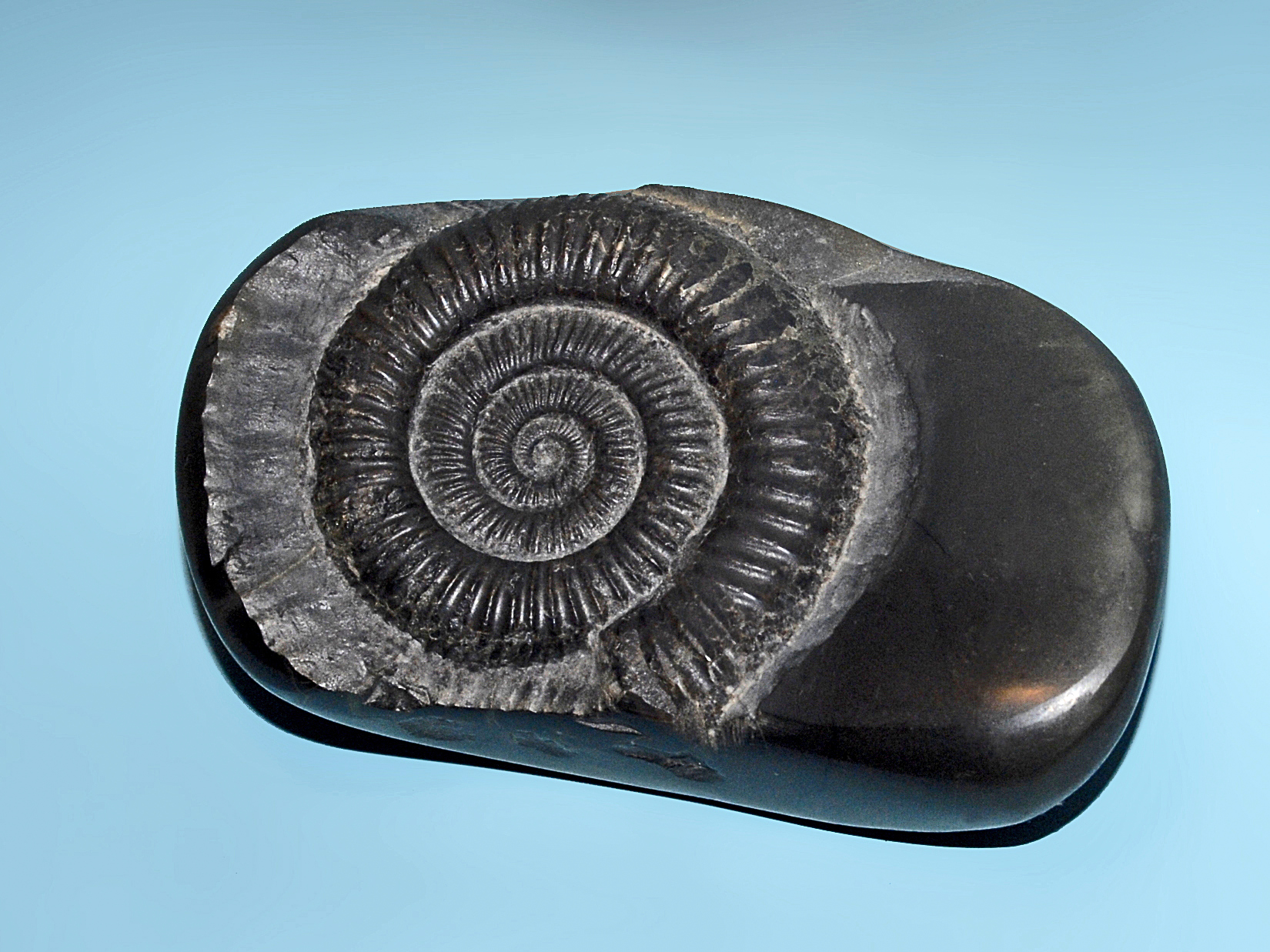
Dactylioceras (Dactylioceras) commune

Dactylioceras commune has shells reaching a diameter of 9–11 centimetres (3.5–4.3 in). Usually the average diameter reach about 24.1 millimetres (0.95 in), while the average width is 8.20 millimetres (0.323 in).

In these small but strong shells ribs run straight or are slightly convex across the venter. These ribs are quite coarse on the outer whorls and finer on the inner whorls. The whorl section is as round as a circle.

Fossils of this species have been found in Lower Jurassic, Toarcian age of Canada, France, Italy, Russia, Serbia and Montenegro, United Kingdom and United States.
