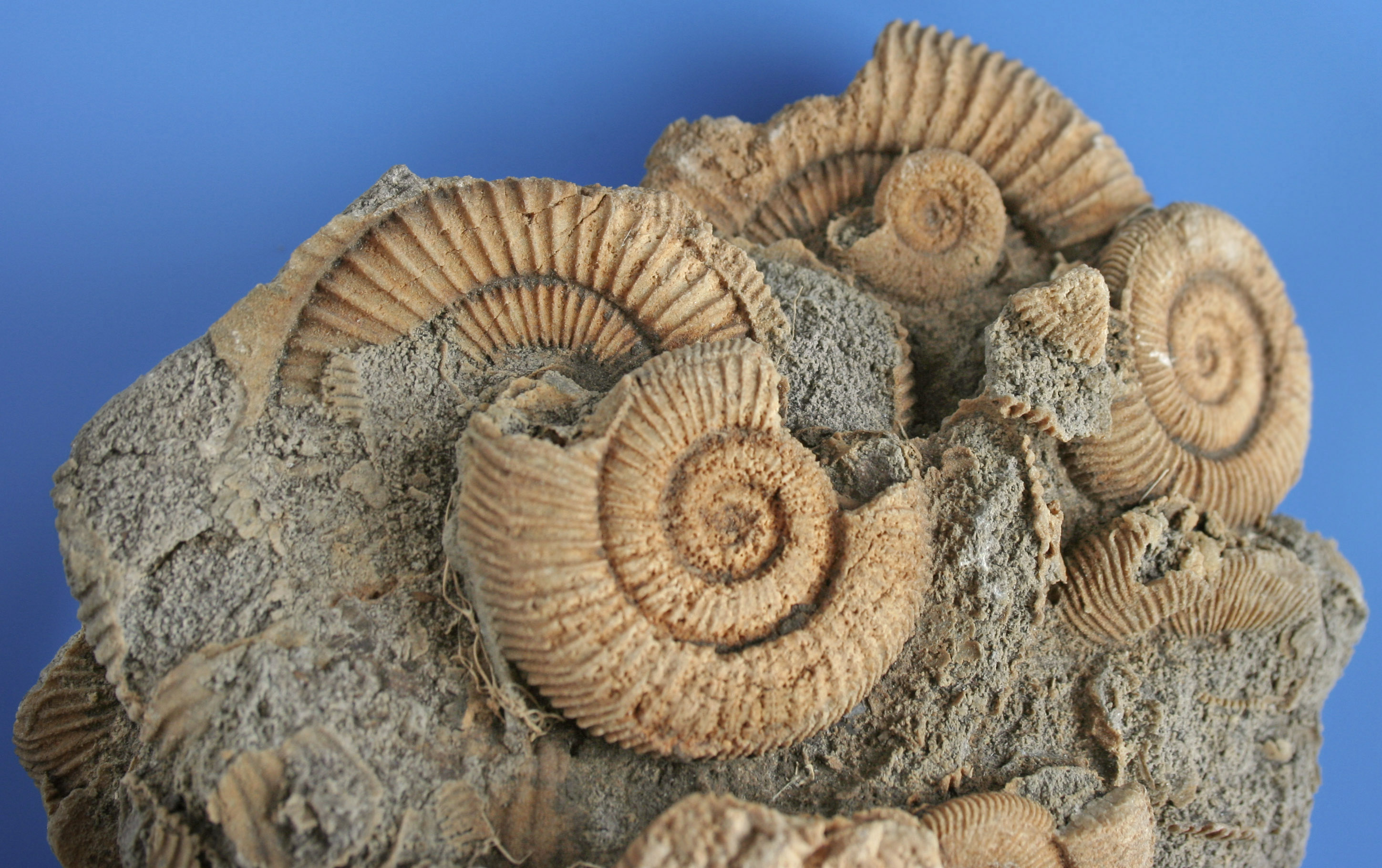
- Ammonites of genus Dactylioceras from Schleifhausen (Germany)

Scientific classification
- Kingdom: Animalia
- Phylum: Mollusca
- Class: Cephalopoda
- Subclass: †Ammonoidea
- Order: †Ammonitida
- Superfamily: †Eoderoceratoidea
- Family: †Dactylioceratidae; Hyatt, 1867

= Dactylioceratidae =

Dactylioceratidae Temporal range: early Jurassic

Extinct family of ammonites

The family Dactylioceratidae comprises Early Jurassic ammonite genera with ribbed and commonly tuberculate shells that resembled later Middle Jurassic stephanoceratids and Upper Jurassic perisphinctids. Shells may be either evolute or involute.

== Description ==
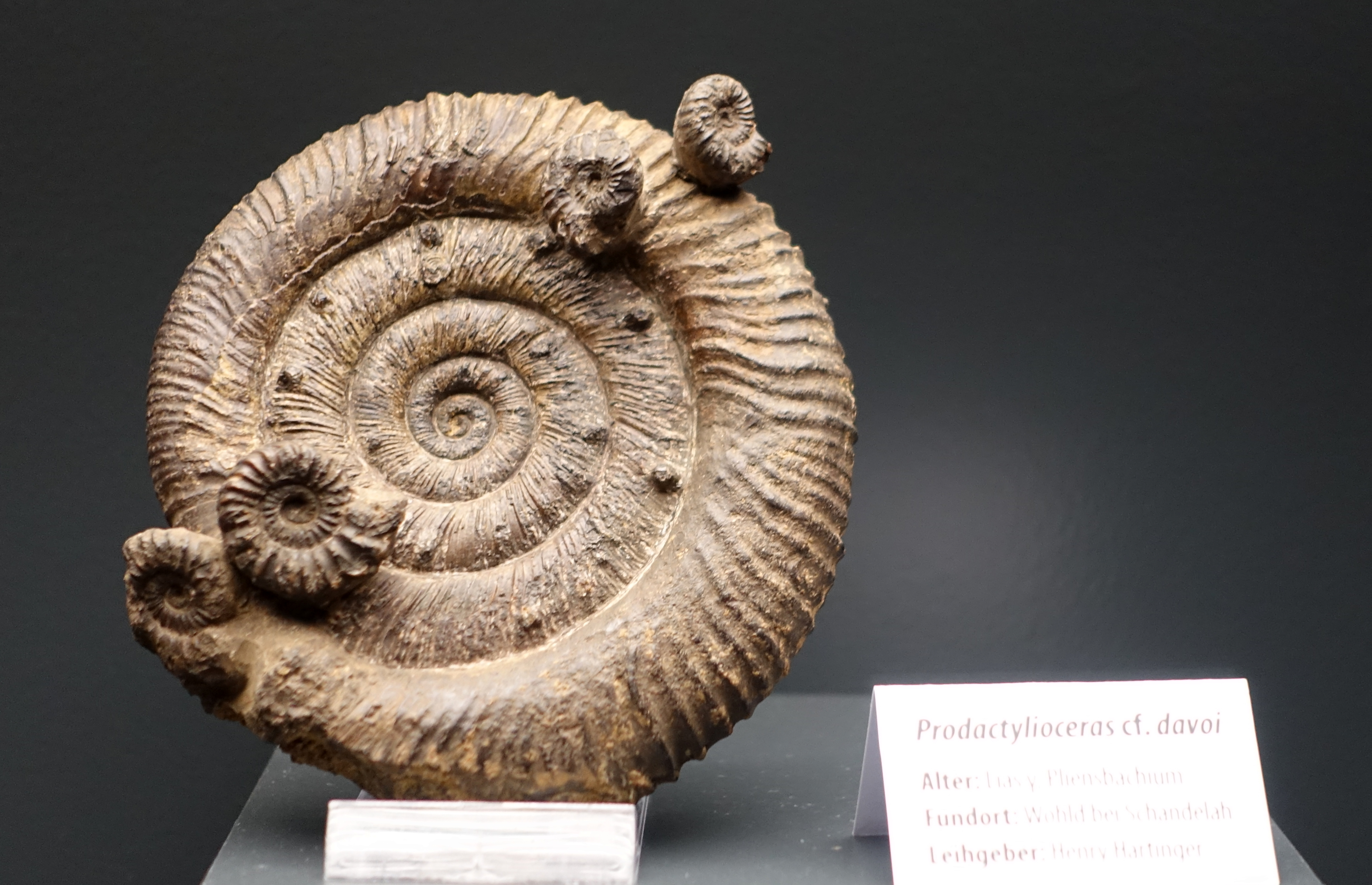
Prodactylioceras cf. davoei

Ammonites with evolute, serpenticone to cadicone shells with ribs, sometimes with tubercules. Members of this family had no keels. while homeomorphic with stephanoceratids and perisphinctids, they had unique shell structure with double shells and flat-topped ribs on the inner shell. Based on suture differences, they are divided into 2 subfamilies. Reynesocoeloceratinae possess two major secondary lobes in dorsal side of external saddle. This saddle is not divided this way in Dactylioceratinae, while lateral lobe is deeply trifid.

== Evolution ==
It has been suggested, that this family is polyphyletic, but this is now considered to be false. Reynesocoeloceratinae evolved in lower Pliensbachian from Metaderoceras and died out in upper Pliensbachian. Reynesoceras oldest member of Dactylioceratinae evolved in upper Pliensbachian from Cetonoceras, or Prodactylioceras. This subfamily died out in middle Toarcian, during Variabilis zone.

Approximate timeline of Dactylioceratidae genera.

== Taxonomy ==
- Dactylioceratidae Hyatt, 1867
  - Reynesocoeloceratinae Dommergues, 1986
    - Reynesocoeloceras Géczy, 1976
    - Bettoniceras Wiedenmayer, 1977
    - Prodactylioceras Spath, 1923
    - Cetonoceras Wiedenmayer, 1977
  - Dactylioceratinae Hyatt, 1867
    - Reynesoceras Spath, 1936
    - Dactylioceras Hyatt, 1867
      - D. (Dactylioceras) Hyatt, 1867
      - D. (Orthodactylites) Buckman, 1926
      - D. (Iranodactylites) Repin, 2000
      - D. (Eodactylites) Schmidt-Effing, 1972
    - Nodicoeloceras Buckman, 1926
    - Peronoceras Hyatt, 1867
    - Zugodactylites Buckman, 1926
    - Porpoceras Buckman, 1911
    - Septimaniceras Fauré, 2002
    - Catacoeloceras Buckman, 1923
    - Collina Bonarelli, 1893
    - Tokurites Repin, 2016
