= Chão das Pias Formation =

Geological formation in Portugal

- Stratigraphic range: Bajocian 170–168 Ma
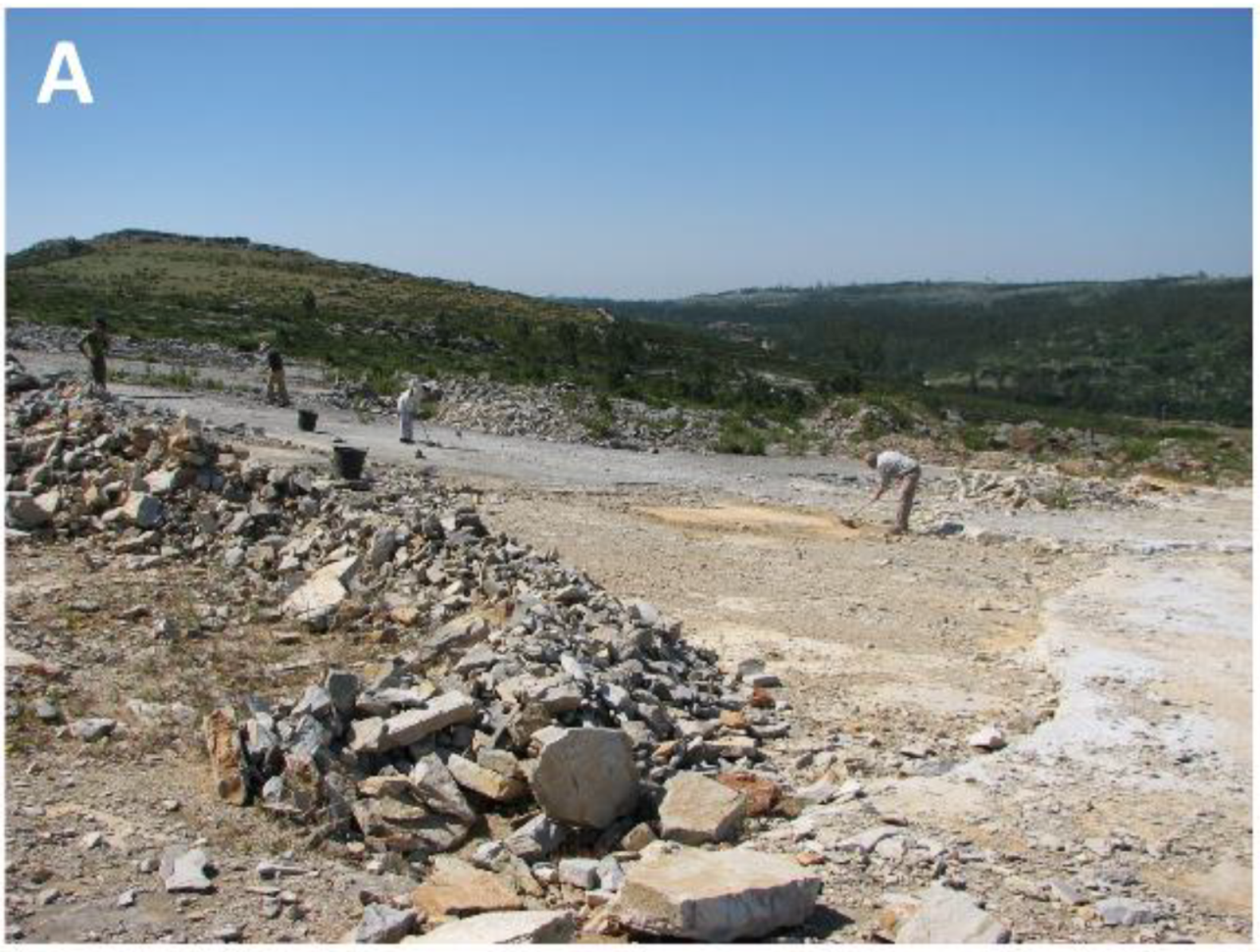
- Cabeço da Ladeira geosite
- Type: Geological formation
- Sub-units: Calcários de Vale da Serra; Dolomitos de Furadouro
- Underlies: Serra de Aire Formation
- Overlies: Barranco do Zambujal Formation
- Area: Lusitanian Basin
- Thickness: 50-60 m

Lithology
- Primary: Slightly clayey or marly limestones

Location
- Location: Maciço Estremenho
- Coordinates: 39°32'38.0", N 8°47'57.0"W
- Region: Lusitanian Basin
- Country: Portugal

Type section
- Named for: The village of Chão das Pias, Santo António plateau
- Named by: Ana Cristina Azerêdo
- Year defined: 2007
- Thickness at type section: ~55 m (180 ft)

The Chão das Pias Formation is a geological formation of Bajocian (Middle Jurassic) age in the Lusitanian Basin of Portugal. Named after the village of Chão das Pias, situated slightly south of Serro Ventoso in the Santo António plateau. This formation overlies the Barranco do Zambujal Formation in sedimentary continuity and is attributed to the transition from the Lower Bajocian to the Upper Bajocian, with its upper limit likely reaching the top of the Upper Bajocian and possibly the base of the Bathonian locally. It comprises a sequence of limestones and dolomites, reflecting varied depositional conditions, and is subdivided into two main members: the Calcários de Vale da Serra and the Dolomitos de Furadouro.

== Description ==
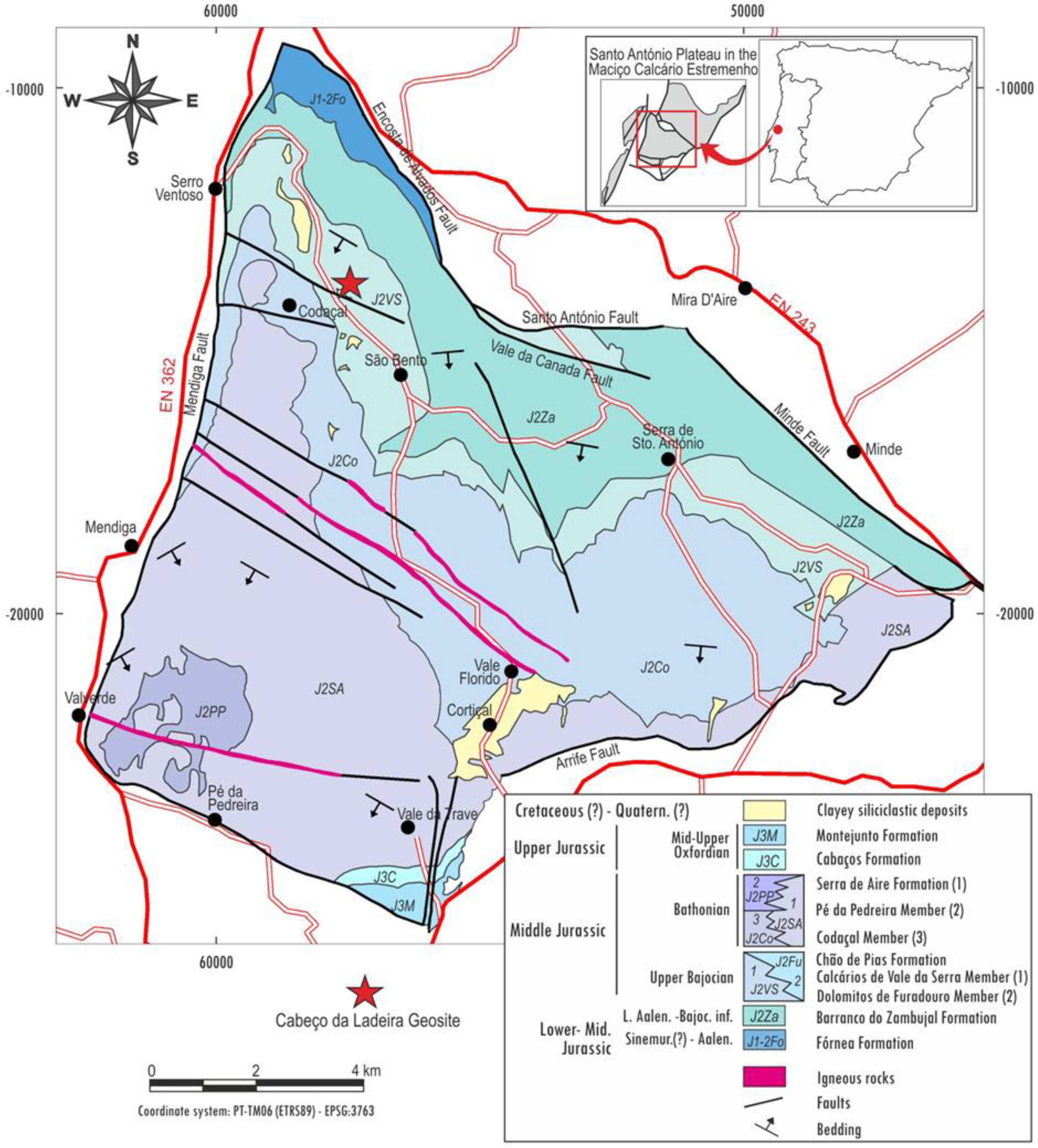
Geological setting of the Formation at the Cabeço da Ladeira paleontological site

The Chão das Pias Formation has an average thickness of 50-60 meters, occasionally exceeding 80 meters, particularly in the eastern sector where dolomitic facies are prominent. It shows lateral and vertical variations, transitioning upward to dolomitic limestones and dolomites that link to overlying formations without clear paleontological boundaries. Its lithology is mostly and primarily made of slightly clayey or marly limestones, yellowish-gray, in decimetric beds, lacking notable macroscopic sedimentary structures. Siliceous nodules are common at the base, limestones dominate in the west, while calco-dolomitic and dolomitic facies prevail in the east, reflecting regional facies changes. Is best exposed near the top of Fórnea/Barranco do Zambujal, extending through the area between Chão das Pias and Cabeço do Carvalho, slightly northeast of Serro Ventoso. Lower and middle parts are visible near Chaínça hill and mill (southeast of Chão das Pias) and toward S. Bento-Covão do Sabugueiro. Upper dolomitic facies (Dolomitos de Furadouro) are exposed in quarries around Lagoa do Furadouro, Serra dos Candeeiros.

The Calcários de Vale da Serra is the lower member, named after the Vale da Serra area and geodetic vertex, southeast of Minde, on the southern edge of the Serra de Aire. It´s made mostly of clayey or marly limestones, yellowish-gray, in decimetric beds, occasionally with centimetric foliated interbeds. The base features micrites and biomicrites (Mudstone and Wackestone) with fine bioclasts of crinoids, echinoids, sponge spicules, ostracods, lagenids, and calcispheres. Siliceous nodules, millimetric to decimetric, occur in the first 15 meters, with a notable level of larger, botryoidal nodules about 40 meters from the top. Upward, limestones become more compact, transitioning to intrapelmicritic and biopelmicritic limestones with ostracods, filaments, and bioturbation, followed by intra-biomicrites with resedimented ooids. At the top, centimetric laminar beds and calciclastic limestones, sometimes dolomitized, are present.

The Dolomitos de Furadouro is the upper level, named after Lagoa do Furadouro, on the northeastern edge of the Serra de Aire. Is predominantly made of massive dolomites, with interbeds of calcitic dolomites and dolomitic limestones. Dolomites are dolomicrosparites and dolosparites, with planar subhedral to euhedral crystalline textures, exhibiting intense moldic or vuggy porosity and karstification. Interbeds include intraclastic and oobioclastic limestones with varying dolomitization (“packstone-grainstone”), containing rare textulariids. Oncolitic and fenestral dolomicrites are frequent toward the top, with the upper part richer in microfossils like foraminifera.

== Paleoenvironment ==
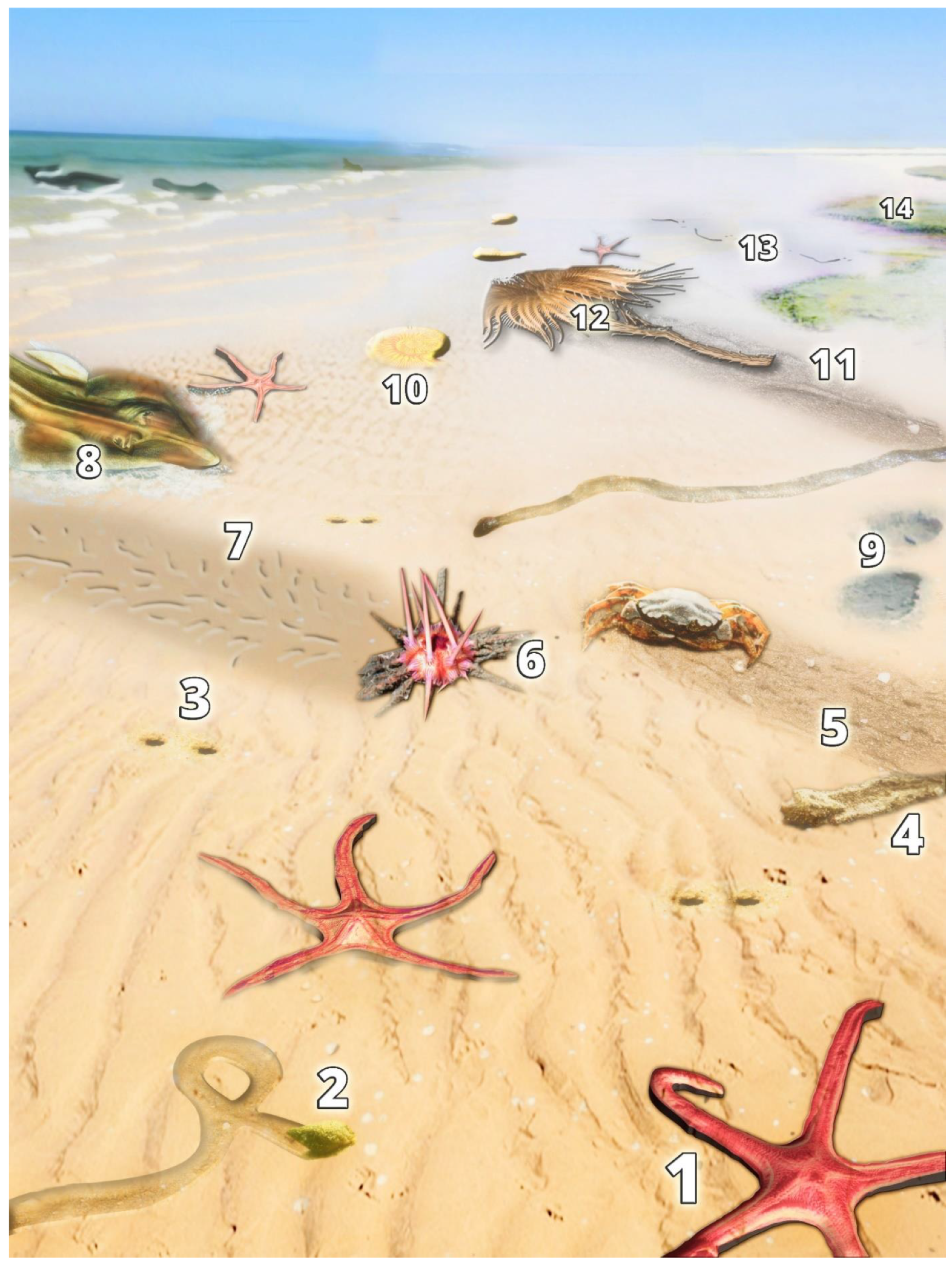
Paleoenvironment reconstruction of Cabeço da Ladeira beach

This unit was deposited in the Lusitanian Basin during the Middle Jurassic, likely within an inner carbonate platform setting. Micritic and biomicritic limestones with fine bioclasts (crinoids, echinoids, sponge spicules, ostracods, etc.) indicate a calm, low-energy marine environment, typical of lagoonal or platform interior zones. Siliceous nodules suggest episodic silica input, possibly from volcanic activity or oceanic circulation. Calciclastic limestones and resedimented ooids reflect higher-energy episodes, such as storms or currents, in areas closer to agitated zones, likely platform margins or shoals. Dolomites, with moldic and vuggy porosity and karstification, point to diagenesis in subaerial or hypersaline fluid settings, characteristic of sabkhas or reflux zones on carbonate platforms. Lateral variation indicate a shift from open carbonate deposition to more restricted, evaporitic conditions eastward. The age, spanning the Lower to Upper Bajocian and possibly the base of the Bathonian, reflects dynamic sedimentation during a period of rift-related basin evolution.

=== Cabeço da Ladeira Lagerstätte ===
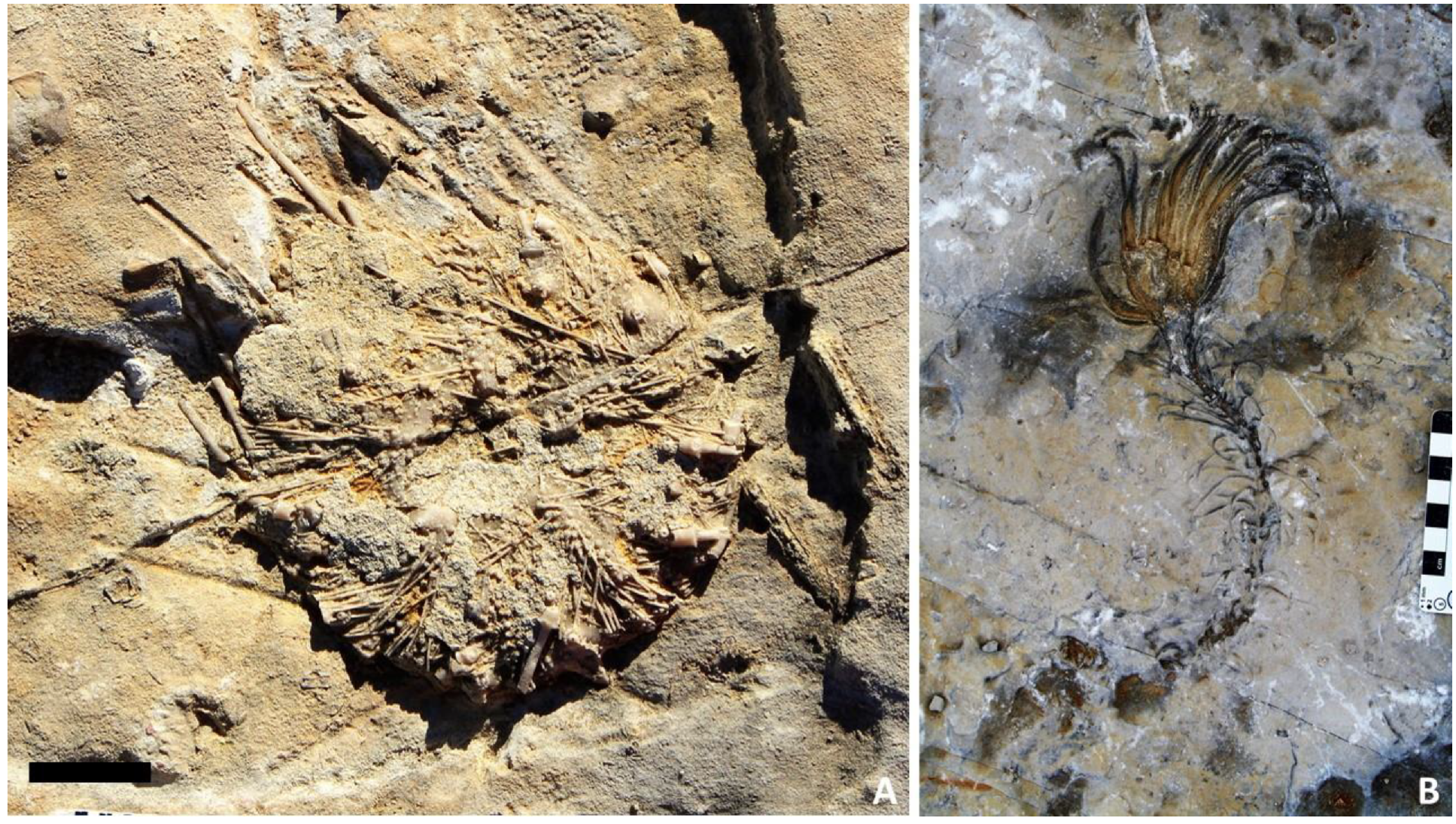
Example of the exceptional preservation of echinoderms at the Cabeço da Ladeira site

At Cabeço da Ladeira, a 50-60 m sequence of Calcários de Vale da Serra starts with greyish-yellow marly and clayish limestones (mudstone–wackestone micrites and biomicrites), grading to calciclastic and dolomitic limestones. The cm-scale beds exhibit ripple marks, microbial mat structures, and bioturbation, with clay layers filling epichnial trails. The sequence is dated to the Humphriesianum ammonite subzone (top of lower Bajocian) based on ammonite finds. This sequence is known as the "Jurassic beach", as it became known for its exceptional preservation of coastal invertebrate faunas. Some famous finds are the potential brachyuran Laterigradus lusitanica, possibly the longest invertebrate trackway ever recorded, as well as a crinoid crawling trail (Krinodromos bentou) a rare example of autotomy-based movement in the fossil record, rhinobatid(?) ray resting imprints, feeding pits, and possible regurgitates.

== Paleobiota ==
The Chão das Pias Formation preserves a diverse Middle Jurassic biota, primarily from the Calcários de Vale da Serra and sparsely from the Dolomitos de Furadouro. Microbial mats are prominent in the Calcários de Vale da Serra, evidenced by wrinkle structures, Kinneya- and flat-topped ripples, ripple patches, mud chips, blisters, and shrinkage cracks, indicating a tidal mudflat environment with episodic subaerial exposure. Foraminifera are present in both members, with rare agglutinated Textulariida in Furadouro and unspecified foraminifera more abundant in its upper part, while occurring without specific genera in Vale da Serra.

=== Body Fossils ===
Genus	Species	Stratigraphic Position	Material	Notes	Images
Actinostreon	gregareum	Cabeço da Ladeira	Shells	A bivalve of the family Ostreidae	
Camptonectes	cf. obscurus	Cabeço da Ladeira	Shells	A bivalve of the family Pectinidae	
Ctenostreon	rugosum	Cabeço da Ladeira	Shells	A bivalve of the family Limidae	
Comatulida indet.	Indeterminate	Cabeço da Ladeira	Semi-articulated skeletons	Crinoid	
Entolium	corneolum	Cabeço da Ladeira	Shells	A bivalve of the family Pectinidae	Entolium specimens
Eopecten	spondyloides	Cabeço da Ladeira	Shells	A bivalve of the family Pectinidae	
Goniasteridae indet.	Indeterminate	Cabeço da Ladeira	Semi-articulated skeletons	Starfish	
Gymnodiadema	hessi	Cabeço da Ladeira	Semi-articulated skeletons	An echinoid of the family Diadematidae	
Gymnocidaris	cf. guerangeri	Cabeço da Ladeira	Semi-articulated skeletons	An echinoid of the family Cidaridae	
Heterocidaris	solaris; sp. nov	Cabeço da Ladeira	Semi-articulated skeletons	An echinoid of the family Cidaridae	
Isocrinida indet.	Indeterminate	Cabeço da Ladeira	Semi-articulated skeletons	Crinoid	
Laevitomaria	sp.	Cabeço da Ladeira	Shells	A gastropod of the family Pleurotomariidae	
Litoceratidae	gen. et sp. indet.	Cabeço da Ladeira	Phragmocones	An ammonite of the family Litoceratidae	
Noviaster	sp. nov.	Cabeço da Ladeira	Semi-articulated skeletons	An asteroid of the family Asteriidae	
Paracidaris	spinulosa	Cabeço da Ladeira	Semi-articulated skeletons	An echinoid of the family Cidaridae	
Pleurotomaria	sp.	Cabeço da Ladeira	Shells	A gastropod of the family Pleurotomariidae	Pleurotomaria specimens
Praechlamys	textoria	Cabeço da Ladeira	Shells	A bivalve of the family Pectinidae	
Propeamussium	aff. pumilum, laevirudiatum	Cabeço da Ladeira	Shells	A bivalve of the family Propeamussiidae	
Pseudopecten	barbatus, dentatus	Cabeço da Ladeira	Shells	A bivalve of the family Pectinidae	
Rhabdocidaris	sp. A, sp. B	Cabeço da Ladeira	Semi-articulated skeletons	An echinoid of the family Cidaridae	
Spondylopecten	cardinatus, subspinosus, palinurus	Cabeço da Ladeira	Shells	A bivalve of the family Pectinidae	
Stephanoceras	mutabile	Cabeço da Ladeira	Shells	An ammonite of the family Stephanoceratidae	Stephanoceras specimen
Stomechinus	bigranularis, sp.	Cabeço da Ladeira	Semi-articulated skeletons	An echinoid of the family Stomechinidae	

=== Ichnofossils ===
Genus	Species	Location	Material	Made by	Images
Archaeonassa	fossulata	Cabeço da Ladeira	Trackway	Gastropod	
Asterosoma	ludwigae	Cabeço da Ladeira	Burrow	Worm-like invertebrate	
Diplopodichnus	isp.	Cabeço da Ladeira	Trackway	Myriapod or similar arthropod (Axiidae?)	
Gyrochorte	comosa	Cabeço da Ladeira	Burrow	Deposit-feeding invertebrate, worm or arthropod	
Haplotichnus	indianensis	Cabeço da Ladeira	Trackway	Diptera larvae (tentative)	
Krinodromos	bentou	Cabeço da Ladeira	Trail	Isocrinid crinoid	
Laterigradus	lusitanica	Cabeço da Ladeira	Trackway	Brachyuran crab	
Rhizocorallium	commune	Cabeço da Ladeira	Burrow (spreite)	Crustaceans (possibly Axiidae)	
Piscichnus	isp.	Cabeço da Ladeira	Feeding burrow	Rajiformes	
Thalassinoides	suevicus	Cabeço da Ladeira	Burrow	Ghost shrimp or similar decapod	
Undichna	isp.	Cabeço da Ladeira	Swimming trail	Fish (fin traces)	

== See also ==
- List of dinosaur-bearing rock formations
- Blue Lias, England
- Charmouth Mudstone Formation, England
- Zagaje Formation, Poland
- Drzewica Formation, Poland
- Ciechocinek Formation, Poland
- Borucice Formation, Poland
- Rotzo Formation, Italy
- Saltrio Formation, Italy
- Moltrasio Formation, Italy
- Marne di Monte Serrone, Italy
- Calcare di Sogno, Italy
- Podpeč Limestone, Slovenia
- El Pedregal Formation, Spain
- Aganane Formation, Morocco
- Tafraout Group, Morocco
- Azilal Formation, Morocco
- El Mers Group, Morocco
- Anoual Formation, Morocco
- Budoš Limestone, Montenegro
- Kota Formation, India
- Cañadón Asfalto Formation, Argentina
- Los Molles Formation, Argentina
- Kandreho Formation, Madagascar
- Elliot Formation, South Africa
- Clarens Formation, South Africa
- Evergreen Formation, Australia
- Cattamarra Coal Measures, Australia
- Hanson Formation, Antarctica
- Mawson Formation, Antarctica
