= Duashnoceras =

Duashnoceras Temporal range: Bathonian

Scientific classification
- Kingdom: Animalia
- Phylum: Mollusca
- Class: Cephalopoda
- Subclass: †Ammonoidea
- Order: †Ammonitida
- Family: †Stephanoceratidae
- Genus: †Duashnoceras

Duashnoceras is an extinct ammonoid cephalopod genus included in the Stephanoceratidae that lived during the Bathonian stage of the Middle Jurassic.

Duashnoceras was established by Westermann in 1983, based on Stephanoceras floresi Burchhardt (1927) and originally placed in the Bathonian Zigzagiceratinae as a subgenus of Zigzagiceras but returned to the Stephanoceratidae by Westermann in 1984

Duashnoceras is a stephanoceratid of variable size; evolute with a very slight uncoiling of the last whorls. Juvenile whorls are depressed subtrapezoidal to subrectangular in section, with slightly convex flanks, arched venter, and well defined ventrolateral shoulders. With further growth the whorl section becomes more elliptical to subcircular with flanks more convex and without ventrolateral shoulders. Primary ribs, which form on the umbilical and dorso-lateral part of the whorls, appear almost immediately. At first the primary ribs are dense but become wide spread on the intermediary whorls, then dense again on the last whorls. Tubercles are conical, usually raised as spines on the intermediary whorls, and are independent of ribs which curve around them. Secondary ribs become thicker on the body chambers of microconchs but thinner of body chambers of macroconchs.

Microconch and macroconch variations, presumed male and female respectively, also differ in their apertures. The aperture of macroconch Duashnoceras is simple, a constriction followed by an elevated lip. That of microconch Duashnoceras has a moderately long lappet, an extension on either side, sometimes preceded by a constriction.

The suture of Duashnoceras is intermediate between that of Stephanoceras and Cadomites. in coiling and whorl section Duashnoceras is similar to Stephanoceras, but differs in ornamentation.
