= Hlawiceras =

Hlawiceras Temporal range: Bajocian

Scientific classification
- Kingdom: Animalia
- Phylum: Mollusca
- Class: Cephalopoda
- Subclass: †Ammonoidea
- Order: †Ammonitida
- Family: †Stephanoceratidae
- Genus: †Hlawiceras

Hlawiceras is an extinct genus from a well known subclass of fossil cephalopods known informally as ammonites that lived during the Jurassic Period, which lasted from approximately 200 to 145 million years ago.Hlawiceras belongs to the family Stephanoceratidae, true ammonites, which is contained in the Stephanoceratoidea. It is probably synonymous with the better known Garantiana

Hlawiceras (Garantiana) has an evolute discoidal shell with a subcircular cross section and close spaced transverse ribbing.
