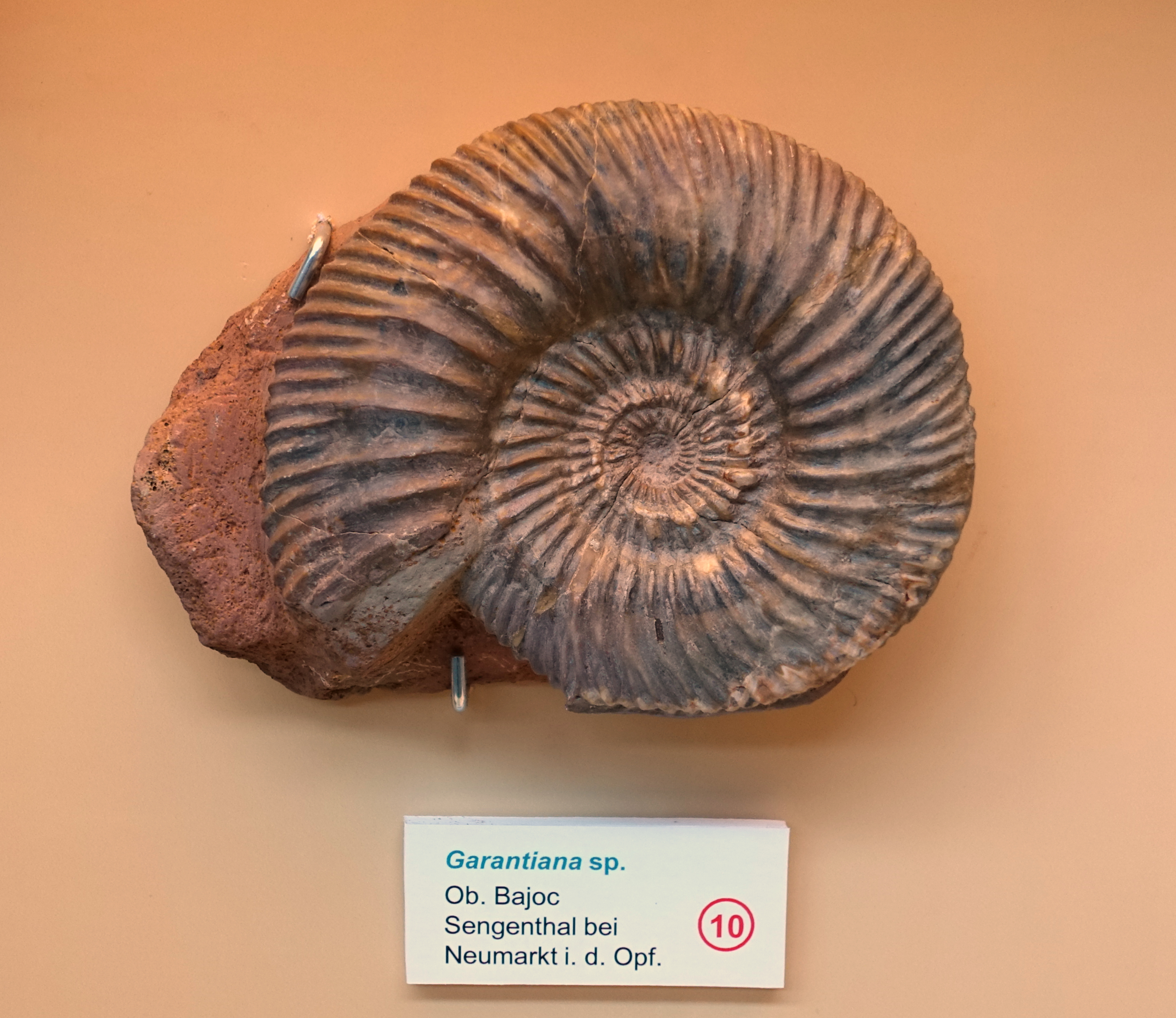
- Fossil of Garantiana garantiana from France, on display at Galerie de paléontologie et d'anatomie comparée in Paris

Scientific classification
- Kingdom: Animalia
- Phylum: Mollusca
- Class: Cephalopoda
- Subclass: †Ammonoidea
- Order: †Ammonitida
- Family: †Stephanoceratidae
- Genus: †Garantiana

= Garantiana =

Garantiana Temporal range: Bajocian–Bathonian

Extinct genus of molluscs

Garantiana is a genus of ammonites from the Bajocian stage at the beginning of the Middle Jurassic, included in the family Stephanoceratidae.

== Description ==
Garantiana is strongly ribbed and generally evolute. The inner whorls are exposed in a wide and fairly deep umbilicus. Ribs arise at the umbilical margin and split in two (bifurcate) about midway up the sides and cross over the outer (ventral) rim.

Garantiana was named by d'Orbigny, 1845. The type species is Garantiana garantiana, which comes from France. Related genera include Orthogarantiana Pseudogarantiana, and Strenoceras.
