= Max von Neumayr =

German administrative lawyer and parliamentarian

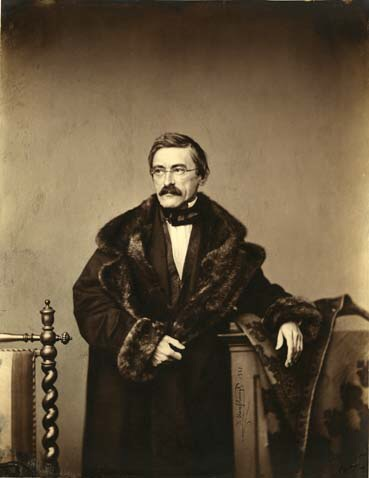
Max von Neumayr, photographed by Franz Hanfstaengl, c. 1861

Max von Neumayr (29 July 1808, Munich – 14 January 1881, Munich) was a German administrative lawyer and parliamentarian in the Kingdom of Bavaria. For a short time, he served as Chairman of the Council of Ministers of the Kingdom of Bavaria.

== Biography ==
Max von Neumayr was the son of State Councillor and later General Director in the Ministry of Finance, Clement von Neumayr (1766–1829). His younger brother was Ludwig von Neumayr, a judge.

He attended the Wilhelmsgymnasium in Munich. After completing secondary school, he studied law and philosophy at the Ludwig-Maximilians-Universität München from 1826 to 1831. In 1827, he became an active member of the Corps Bavaria Munich.

In 1836, Neumayr joined the Bavarian Ministry of the Interior as a secretary. He was promoted to Ministerial Secretary (Regierungsassessor) in 1841 and then to Ministerial Assessor (Regierungsrat) in 1842. In 1847, he moved to the Ministry of Culture as an Oberstudienrat; by the time of the German revolutions of 1848–1849, he served as a Ministerialrat in that ministry.

From 27 May 1848 to 7 May 1849, he was a deputy in the Frankfurt National Assembly for the constituency of Burghausen. There, he supported the Greater German solution. In 1849, he was assigned to handle diplomatic affairs in the Kingdom of Württemberg, becoming chargé d’affaires in 1850 and Minister Resident in Stuttgart in 1859.

Neumayr returned to Munich in 1859 to become Minister of the Interior in the cabinet under Karl von Schrenck. During the ministerial crisis of 1864, he temporarily also administered the Ministry of the Royal Household and Foreign Affairs (which included the chairmanship of the Council of Ministers), following Karl von Schrenck’s departure. That crisis eventually ended with the reappointment of Ludwig von der Pfordten to that position on 31 December 1864 and led to Neumayr’s resignation (tendered on 4 November 1865) as Interior Minister.

At the insistence of composer Richard Wagner in the autumn of 1866, King Ludwig II of Bavaria appointed Neumayr as Cabinet Secretary; however, by the end of the year, Neumayr asked to be relieved of this office. In 1868, he was elected to the Zollparlament representing Reichstagswahlkreis Oberbayern 7. He spent much of his later life on his estate near Miesbach.

Max von Neumayr died in Munich in 1881 at the age of 72.

== Grave ==
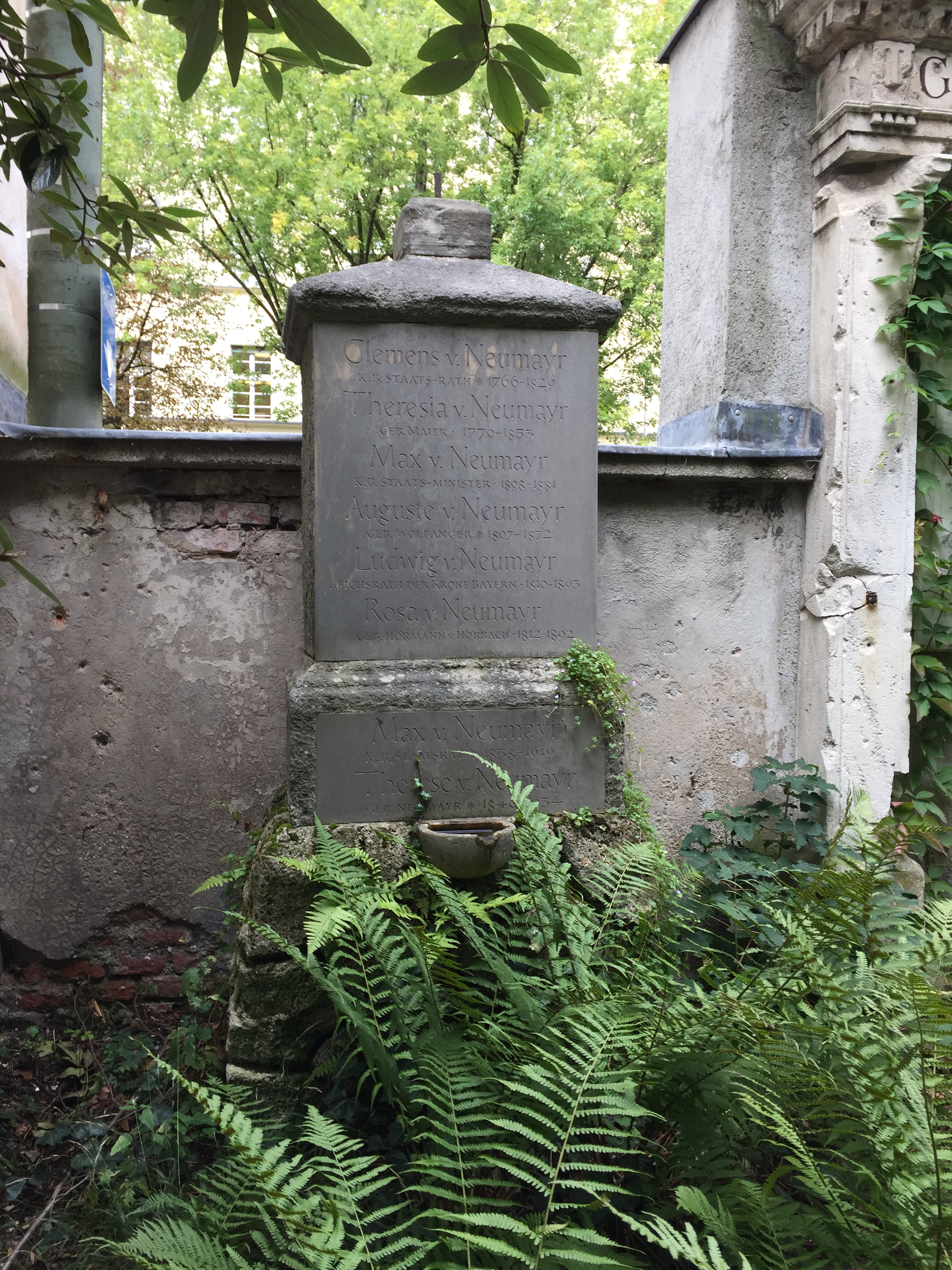
Grave of Max von Neumayr

His grave is located in the Alter Südfriedhof in Munich (Mauer Rechts Platz 242/243 at grave field 14).

== Descendants ==
He was the father of the paleontologist Melchior Neumayr.

== Honors ==
- Commander’s Cross of the Württembergian Order of the Crown (Michaelorden) (1859)
- Grand Cross of the Württemberg Friedrich Order (1859)

== Literature ==
- Rainer Hofmann. "Neumayr, Max von". Neue Deutsche Biographie (in German). Vol. 19. pp. 169–170.
