= Arkelloceras =

Arkelloceras Temporal range: Bajocian

Scientific classification
- Kingdom: Animalia
- Phylum: Mollusca
- Class: Cephalopoda
- Subclass: †Ammonoidea
- Order: †Ammonitida
- Family: †Otoitidae
- Genus: †Arkelloceras

Arkelloceras is an early Middle Jurassic (Bajocian stage) Stephanoceratoid (Ammonitina) genus from arctic Canada, Alaska, and Siberia belonging to the family Otoitidae (Imlay 1984, Westermann 1965)

Arkelloceras seems to be a direct descendant of Abbasites and is thought to have given rise to Ermoceras and possibly to Thamboceras. (Westermann 1965)
