= Emileia =

Emileia Temporal range: Bajocian

Scientific classification
- Kingdom: Animalia
- Phylum: Mollusca
- Class: Cephalopoda
- Subclass: †Ammonoidea
- Order: †Ammonitida
- Family: †Otoitidae
- Genus: †Emileia; Buckman, 1898

Species
- Emileia brocchii; Emileia contrahens; Emileia dundriensis

Genus of molluscs (fossil)

Emileia is an extinct genus from a well-known class of fossil cephalopods, the ammonites, that lived during the early part of the Bajocian.

Emileiais a large form with fine ribbing that includes may secondaries. It begins as a barrel shaped cadicone, with an eccentric, more or less smooth body chamber.

Emileia is included in the family Otoitidae and superfamily Stephanoceratoidea of the Ammonitina
