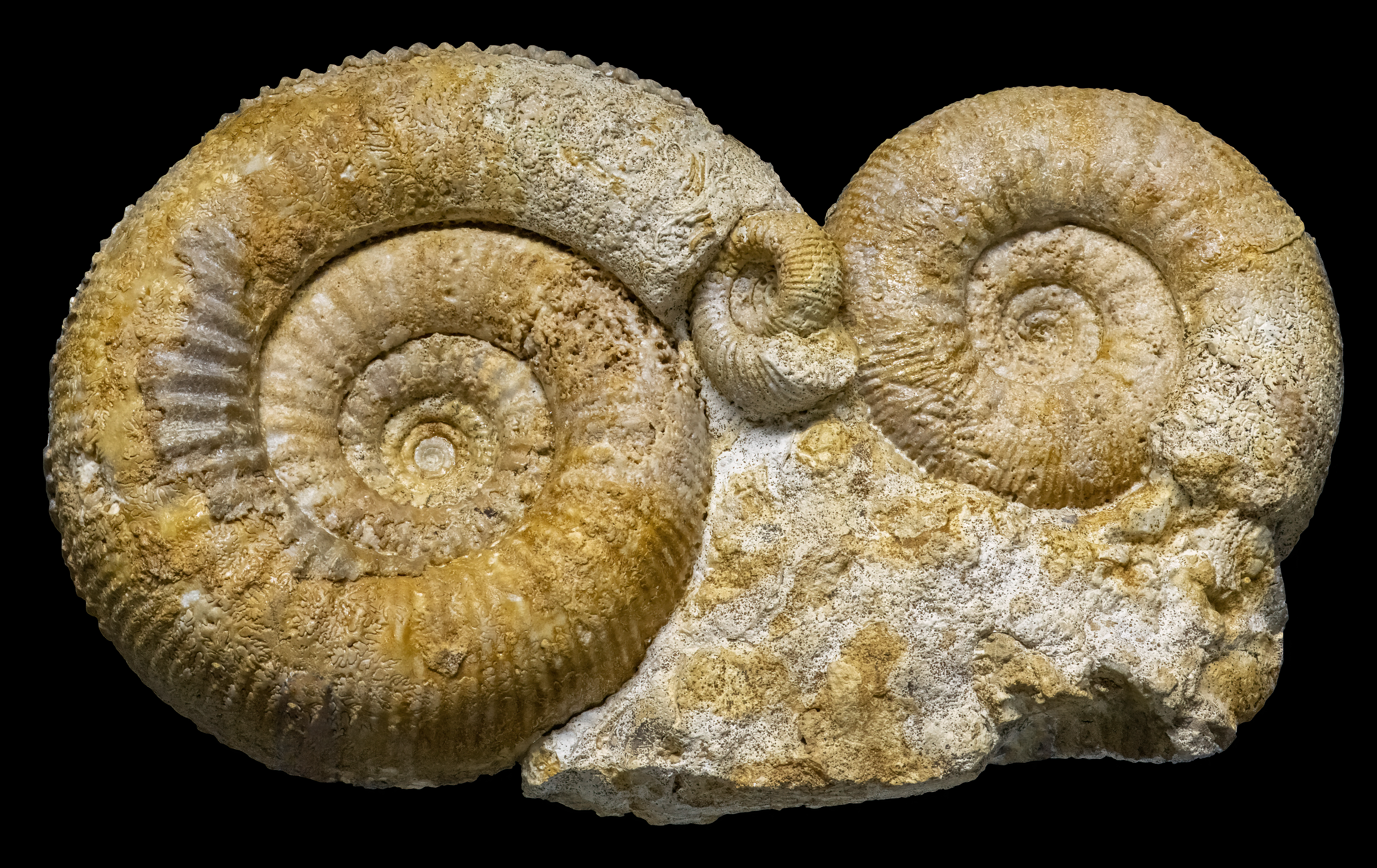
- Cadomites deslongchampsii Type species of the genus - Bayeux France MHNT

Scientific classification
- Kingdom: Animalia
- Phylum: Mollusca
- Class: Cephalopoda
- Subclass: †Ammonoidea
- Order: †Ammonitida
- Family: †Stephanoceratidae
- Genus: †Cadomites; Munier-Chalmas, 1892

= Cadomites =

Cadomites Temporal range: from Bajocian to Callovian, 171.6–164.7 Ma

Extinct genus of ammonites

Cadomites is an extinct ammonite genus from the superfamily Stephanoceratoidea that lived during the Middle Jurassic (upper Bajocian – lower Callovian).

== Description ==
Cadomites is directly descended from Stephanoceras, with a similar collared and lipped aperture rim, but has denser, finer, sharper ribbing. The shell is discoidal, evolute, with a wide umbilicus. The suture is complex.

== Distribution ==
Fossils of species within this genus have been found in the Middle Jurassic sediments in Europe, Africa and South Asia.
