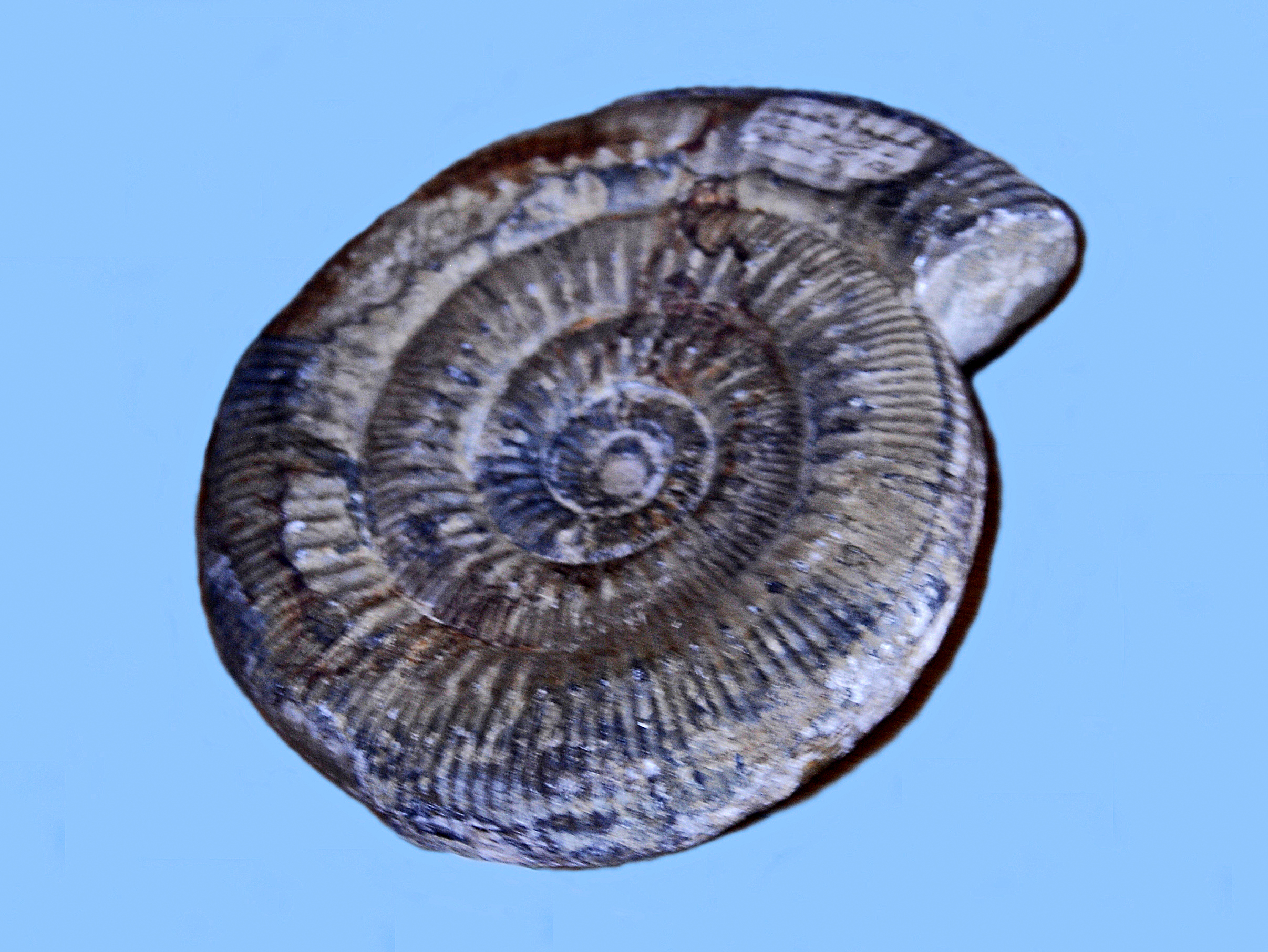
- Fossil of Skirroceras bayleanum from United Kingdom, on display at Galerie de paléontologie et d'anatomie comparée in Paris

Scientific classification
- Kingdom: Animalia
- Phylum: Mollusca
- Class: Cephalopoda
- Subclass: †Ammonoidea
- Order: †Ammonitida
- Family: †Stephanoceratidae
- Genus: †Skirroceras
- Species: †S. bayleanum

Binomial name
- †Skirroceras bayleanum (Oppel, 1857)

= Skirroceras bayleanum =

Skirroceras bayleanum Temporal range: Jurassic (Bajocian), 171.6–167.7 Ma

Species of mollusc (fossil)

Skirroceras bayleanum is a Stephanoceratacean (ammonite) species belonging to the family Stephanoceratidae.

These fast-moving nektonic carnivores lived during the Jurassic period, in the Bajocian age.

== Description ==
Skirroceras bayleanum has a shell reaching about 10.8 centimetres (4.3 in) of diameter.

== Distribution ==
Fossils of Skirroceras bayleanum are found in the Middle Jurassic Bajocian age marine strata of United Kingdom and France.
