= Otoites =

Otoites Temporal range: Bajocian

Scientific classification
- Kingdom: Animalia
- Phylum: Mollusca
- Class: Cephalopoda
- Subclass: †Ammonoidea
- Order: †Ammonitida
- Family: †Otoitidae
- Genus: †Otoites; Mascke, 1907

Species
- Otoites douvillei; Otoites sauzei; Otoites tumulosus

Genus of molluscs (fossil)

Otoites is the type genus of the ammonite family Otoitidae that live during the Middle Jurassic.

The Otoitidae, which is part of the superfamily Stephanoceratoidea, are part of the well known subclass of prehistoric cephalopods known in general terms as ammonites

Otoites is characterized by barrel-shaped, cadiconic, inner whorls and contracted last whorl; coarse ribs with long secondaries that come off of low lateral tubercles; and lappets flanking the aperture.

== Distribution ==
The Jurassic of Spain
