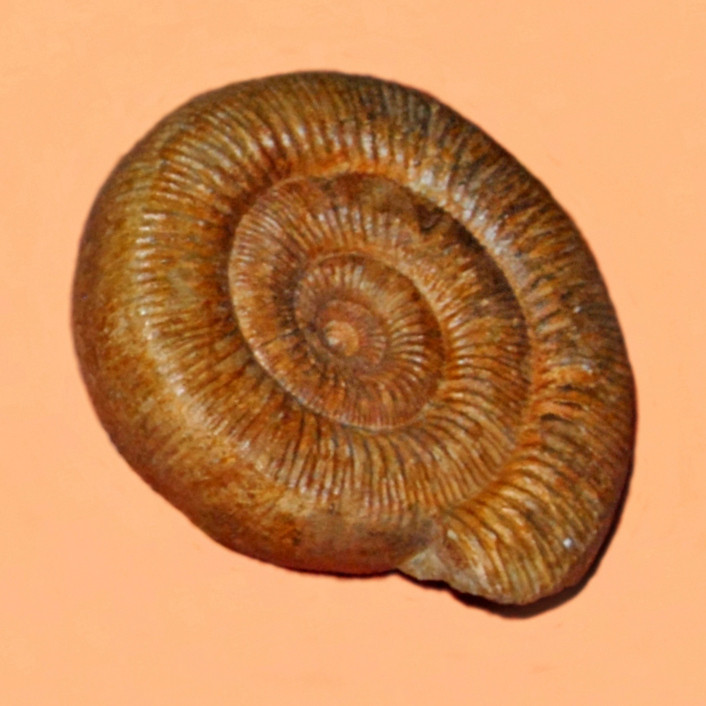
- Fossil of Skirroceras macrum from France, on display at the Museo Civico di Storia Naturale di Milano

Scientific classification
- Kingdom: Animalia
- Phylum: Mollusca
- Class: Cephalopoda
- Subclass: †Ammonoidea
- Order: †Ammonitida
- Family: †Stephanoceratidae
- Genus: †Skirroceras
- Species: †S. macrum

Binomial name
- †Skirroceras macrum (von Quenstedt)

= Skirroceras macrum =

Skirroceras macrum Temporal range: Jurassic (Bajocian), 171.6–167.7 Ma

Species of mollusc (fossil)

Skirroceras macrum is a Stephanoceratacean (ammonite) species belonging to the family Stephanoceratidae.

These fast-moving nektonic carnivores lived during the Jurassic period, in the Bajocian age.

== Description ==
Skirroceras macrum has an evolute shell reaching about 11.5 centimetres (4.5 in) of diameter. These ammonites are heavily ribbed, with characteristic nodes.

== Distribution ==
Fossils of Skirroceras macrum are found in the Middle Jurassic Bajocian age marine strata of England and France.
