= Neumayr =

Neumayr is a surname. Notable people with the surname include:

- Franz Neumayr (1697–1765), German Jesuit theologian
- Markus Neumayr (born 1986), German-Swiss footballer
- Mary Neumayr (born 1964), American government official
- Max von Neumayr (1808–1881), Bavarian minister
- Melchior Neumayr (1845–1890), Austrian palaeontologist
