= Docidoceras =

Docidoceras Temporal range: Bajocian

Scientific classification
- Domain: Eukaryota
- Kingdom: Animalia
- Phylum: Mollusca
- Class: Cephalopoda
- Subclass: †Ammonoidea
- Order: †Ammonitida
- Family: †Otoitidae
- Genus: †Docidoceras; Buckman, 1919

Species
- Docidoceras biforme; Docidoceras chandleri; Docidoceras chocsinkyi; Docidoceras cylindroides; Docidoceras wysogorskii; Docidoceras zemistephanoides

Genus of molluscs (fossil)

Docidoceras is an extinct ammonite genus from the order Ammonitida that lived during the Middle Jurassic. Docidoceras is included in the family Otoitidae which makes up part of the ammonite superfamily Stephanoceratoidea.

Docidoceras has a broad, finely ribbed, evolute shell with a depressed whorl section. The venter, the outer rim, is broadly arched and crossed by the ribs without interruption. The dorsum, on the inner rim of the whorls is broadly impressed.

== Distribution ==
Fossils of Docidoceras have been found in:

- Laberge Group, Yukon, Canada
- Agoudim Formation, Morocco
- Andalusia, Spain
- Inferior Oolite, United Kingdom
- Kialagvik Formation, Alaska, United States
