= Bavarian Ministry of the Interior =

Coordinates: 48°08′32″N 11°34′39″E

Bavarian Ministry of the Interior, Sport and Integration
- Bayerisches Staatsministerium des Innern, für Sport und Integration

Agency overview
- Formed: 29 October 1806 (219 years ago) as the Departement des Innern
- Headquarters: Munich
- Employees: 900
- Annual budget: €6.046 billion (2019)
- Minister responsible: Joachim Herrmann, Bayerischer Staatsminister des Innern
- Child agencies: Bavarian State Police; Bavarian Office for the Protection of the Constitution
- Website: http://www.stmi.bayern.de

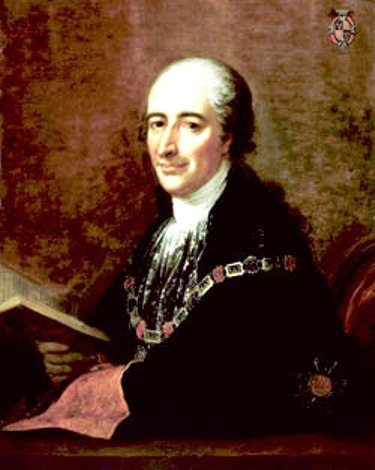
Maximilian von Montgelas

The Bavarian Ministry of the Interior, Sport and Integration (German: Bayerisches Staatsministerium des Innern, für Sport und Integration) is the interior ministry of Bavaria. It is headquartered in Munich, and was established on November 21, 1806 as the Departement des Innern. The first Minister of the Interior was Count Maximilian von Montgelas (until 1817).

Since October 16, 2007, Joachim Herrmann (CSU) has been Minister of the Interior.

On September 1st, 2024, the Bavarian Ministry of the Interior uploaded a video on their official X (formerly Twitter) account which contained a number of seemingly Islamophobic tropes and imagery. The post has since been deleted from their account.

== List of interior ministers of Bavaria since 1806 (incomplete) ==
- Maximilian Graf von Montgelas, 1806-1817
- Friedrich Karl Graf von Thürheim, 1817-1826
- Josef Ludwig Graf von Armansperg, 1 January 1826 - 1 September 1828
- Eduard von Schenk, 1 September 1828 – 27 May 1831
- Johann Baptist von Stürmer, 27 May – 31 December 1831 (acting)
- Ludwig Fürst von Oettingen-Wallerstein, 31 December 1831 – 4 November 1837
- Karl (von) Abel, 5 November 1837 – 13 February 1847 (acting until 31 March 1838)
- Anton von Fischer, 13 February - 1 March 1847 (acting)
- Johann Baptist von Zenetti, 1 March 1847 – 1 December 1847 (acting)
- Franz von Berks, 1 December 1847 - 5 March 1848 (acting)
- Gottlieb Friedrich Freiherr von Thon-Dittmer, 8 March - 14 November 1848
- Gustav Freiherr von Lerchenfeld, 15 November - 18 December 1848
- Moritz von Weigend, 19–31 December 1848
- Hermann von Beisler, 31 December 1848 - 9 June 1849
- Theodor von Zwehl, 9 Juni 1849 - 20 November 1852
- August Lothar Graf von Reigersberg, 20 November 1852 - 1 May 1859
- Max Ritter von Neumayr, 1 May 1859 - 7 November 1865

...

- Karl August Fischer (non-partisan), 1945
- Josef Seifried (SPD), 1945-1947
- Willi Ankermüller (CSU), 1947-1950
- Wilhelm Hoegner (SPD), 1950-1954
- August Geislhöringer (Bayernpartei), 1954-1957
- Otto Bezold (FDP), 1957-1958
- Alfons Goppel (CSU), 1958-1962
- Heinrich Junker (CSU), 1962-1966
- Bruno Merk (CSU), 1966-1977
- Alfred Seidl (CSU), 1977-1978
- Gerold Tandler (CSU), 1978-1982
- Karl Hillermeier (CSU), 1982-1986
- August Richard Lang (CSU), 1986-1988
- Edmund Stoiber (CSU), 1988-1993
- Günther Beckstein (CSU), 1993-2007
- Joachim Herrmann (CSU), since 2007
