= Kumatostephanus =

Kumatostephanus Temporal range: Bajocian

Scientific classification
- Kingdom: Animalia
- Phylum: Mollusca
- Class: Cephalopoda
- Subclass: †Ammonoidea
- Order: †Ammonitida
- Family: †Stephanoceratidae
- Genus: †Kumatostephanus; Buckman, 1922

Genus of molluscs (fossil)

Kumatostephanus is an extinct genus from a well-known class of fossil cephalopods, the ammonites. It lived during the Jurassic Period, which lasted from approximately 200 to 145 million years ago. It was slow moving and likely to fall victim to large predators such as Liopleurodon, or small mosasaurs.
