= Zigzagiceras =

Zigzagiceras Temporal range: Bathonian

Scientific classification
- Kingdom: Animalia
- Phylum: Mollusca
- Class: Cephalopoda
- Subclass: †Ammonoidea
- Order: †Ammonitida
- Family: †Perisphinctidae
- Genus: †Zigzagiceras d'Orbigny, 1846

Species
- Zigzagiceras zigzag

Genus of molluscs (fossil)

Zigzagiceras is an extinct cephalopod genus belonging to the order Ammonoidea, that lived during the upper Bathonian stage of the Middle Jurassic. They were fast-moving nektonic carnivores.
