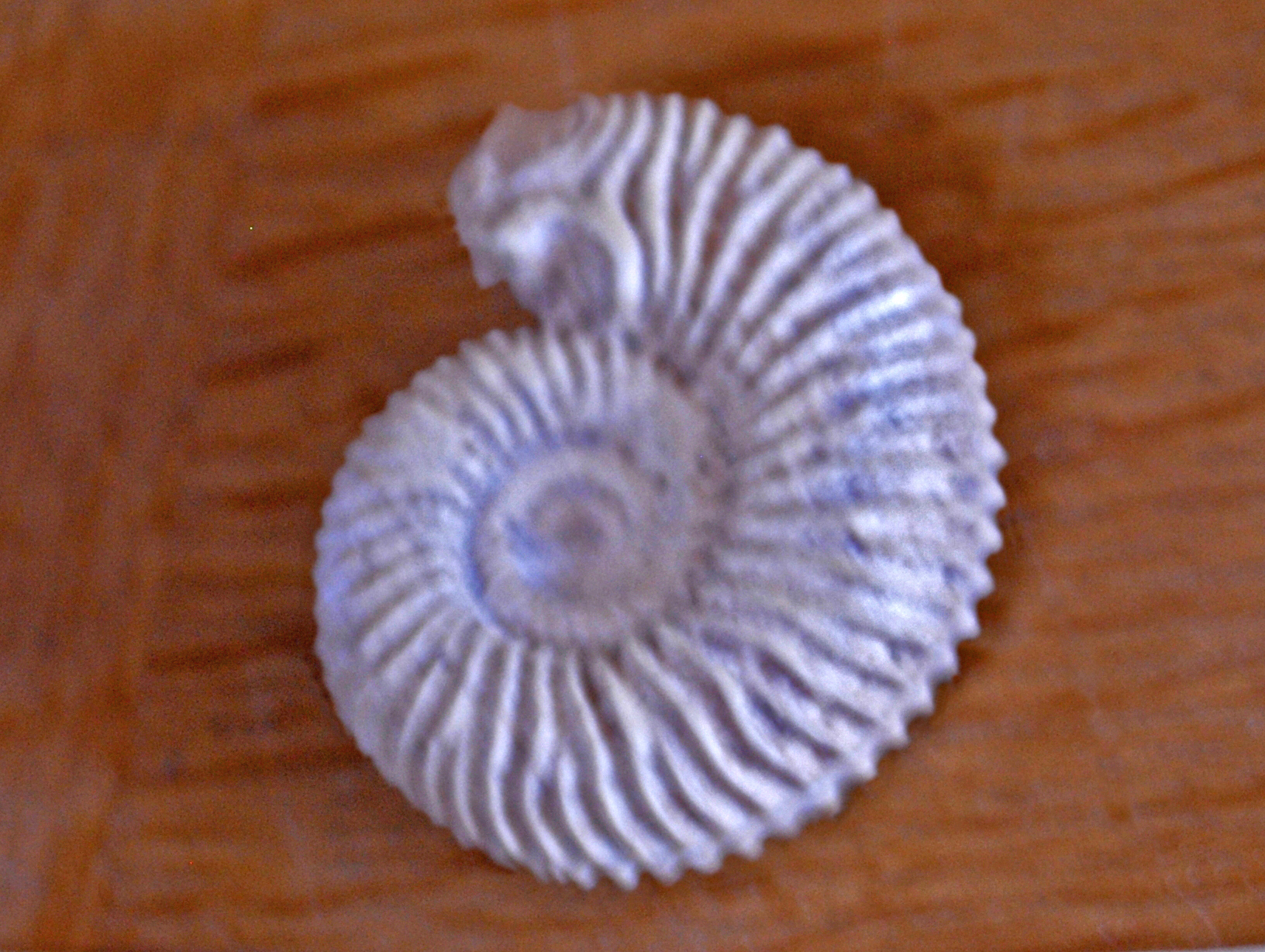
- Fossil of Pseudogarantiana dichotoma, on display at Galerie de paléontologie et d'anatomie comparée in Paris

Scientific classification
- Kingdom: Animalia
- Phylum: Mollusca
- Class: Cephalopoda
- Subclass: †Ammonoidea
- Order: †Ammonitida
- Family: †Stephanoceratidae
- Genus: †Pseudogarantiana

= Pseudogarantiana =

Pseudogarantiana Temporal range: Bajocian

Extinct genus of molluscs

Pseudogarantiana is an extinct genus from a well-known class of fossil cephalopods, the ammonites. It lived during the Middle Jurassic.

== Distribution ==
None cataloged
