= Baron Karl Ludwig von der Pfordten =

Bavarian politician (1811–1880)

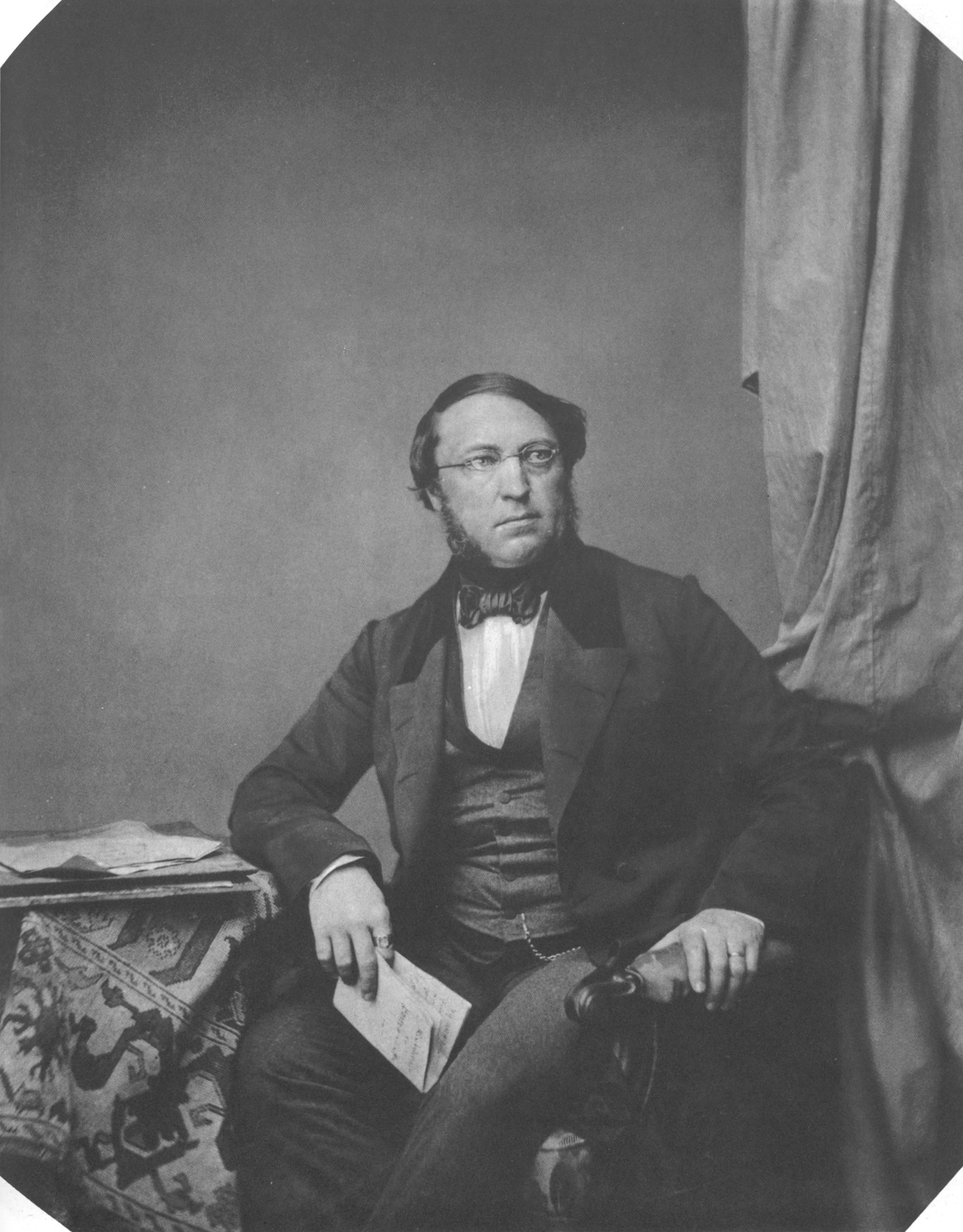
Ludwig von der Pfordten, c. 1855

Ludwig Karl Heinrich Freiherr von der Pfordten (11 September 1811 in Ried (Innkreis) – 18 August 1880 in Munich) was a Bavarian attorney and politician.

== Biography ==
Von der Pfordten studied law at the University of Heidelberg and Erlangen. In 1833 he became a professor in Würzburg. In 1843 he moved to the University of Leipzig; from 1845 he served as its president and became a leader of the Saxon Liberal Party. In March 1848 he was appointed Saxon Interior Minister and Education Minister under Prime Minister Karl Braun. When Braun resigned in February 1849, von der Pfordten returned to Bavaria and was appointed Minister-President of Bavaria and Foreign Minister by King Maximilian II of Bavaria.

His project was to unite the German middle-sized powers under Bavarian leadership against Prussia and Austria as a "Third Germany" (the so-called Trias). Thus, he was partly responsible that Bavaria in actuality torpedoed the project of the Erfurt Union. After an agreement between Austria and Prussia was reached with the Punctation of Olmütz in December 1850, the trias concept lost most of its importance in the subsequent few years and von der Pfordten resigned in 1859. He then was the Bavarian envoy for the Frankfurt Parliament.

In 1864 von der Pfordten returned to power when King Ludwig II of Bavaria restored him. He resigned again in December 1866, since his placement efforts had failed and Bavaria had lost the Austro-Prussian War as an ally of Austria.

== Orders and decorations ==
- Kingdom of Bavaria:
  - Grand Cross of the Royal Merit Order of the Bavarian Crown, 1849
  - Knight of the Royal Order of Saint Hubert, 1866
- Württemberg:
  - Grand Cross of the Friedrich Order, 1850
  - Grand Cross of the Order of the Württemberg Crown, 1854
- Electorate of Hesse: Knight of the House Order of the Golden Lion, 20 February 1851
- Grand Duchy of Hesse: Grand Cross of the Grand Ducal Hessian Order of Ludwig, 9 August 1853
- Kingdom of Prussia: Knight of the Order of the Red Eagle, 1st Class, 14 August 1854

Political offices
Preceded by Count Otto von Bray-Steinburg	Minister-President of Bavaria; 1849–1859	Succeeded by Karl von Schrenck von Notzing
Preceded by Max Ritter von Neumayr	Minister-President of Bavaria; 1864–1866	Succeeded by Chlodwig, Prince of Hohenlohe-Schillingsfürst
