= Gordia =

Gordia Temporal range: Ediacaran–Tertiary

Trace fossil classification
- Ichnogenus: Gordia; Emmons, 1844

Trace fossil

Gordia is an ichnofossil known from Precambrian to modern sediments and is the most common trace fossil in the Kaili biota displaying "smooth, cylindrical or subcylindrical, non-branching, winding and irregularly curving burrows, commonly self-overcrossing". Probably made by a worm-like creature displaying fodinichnial (sediment scavenging) behaviour. It takes the form of unlined, curving parallel-walled burrows that often end with a nub, probably created as the creature probed the over- or under-lying sediment. It resembles Helminthopsis and Haplotichnus.
