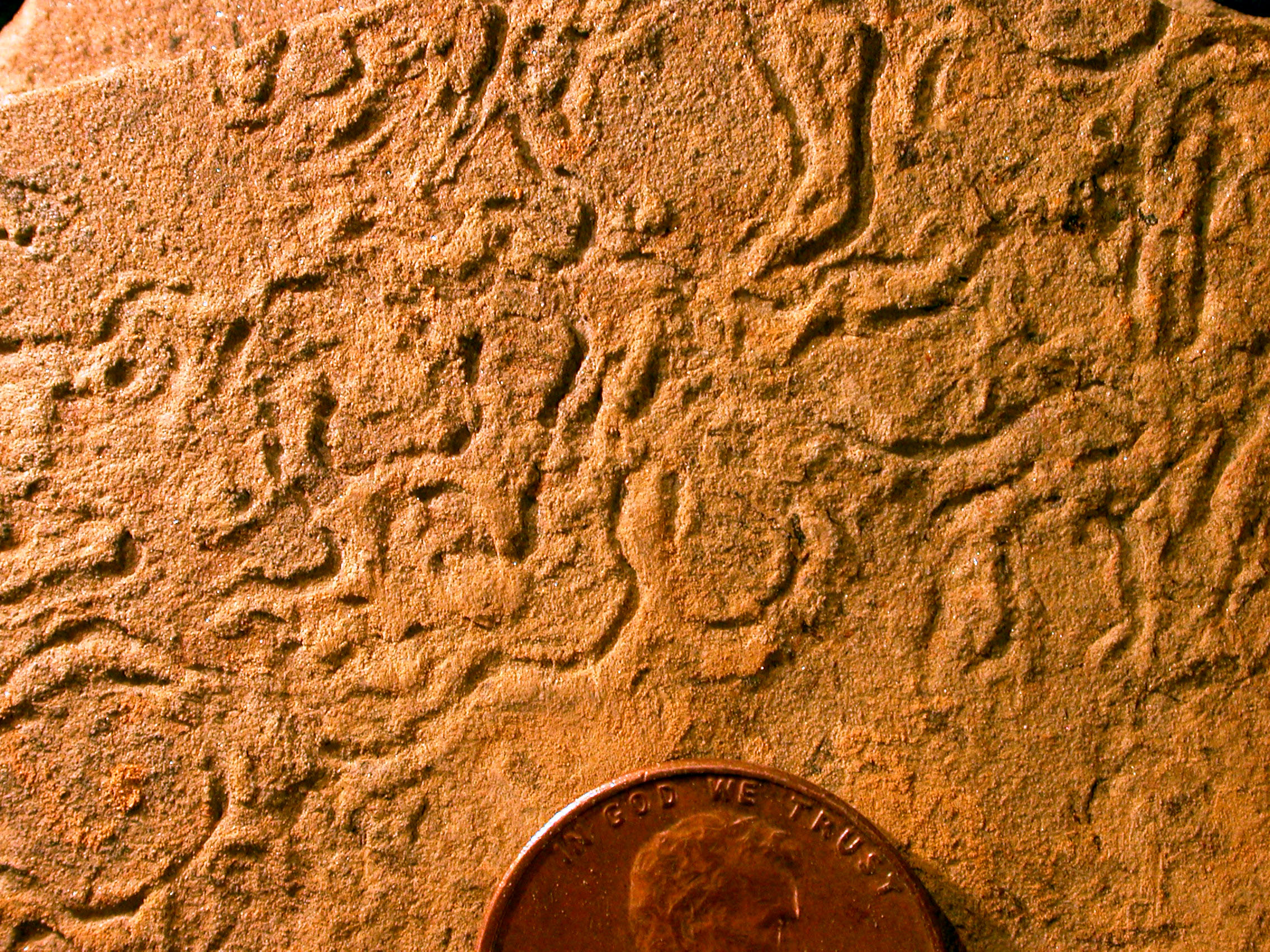
- Helminthopsis trace fossils from the Logan Formation (Lower Carboniferous) of Wooster, Ohio
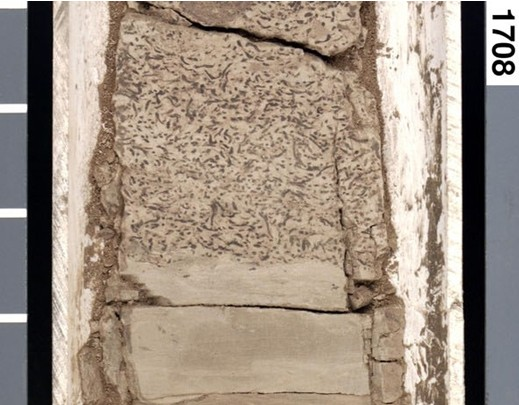
- Helminthopsis trace fossils in a core from the Belridge Diatomite (Upper Miocene) of Lost Hills Oil Field, California

Trace fossil classification
- Ichnogenus: †Helminthopsis; Heer, 1877

= Helminthopsis =

Trace fossil

Helminthopsis is an ichnogenus of trace fossil that is found preserved on the bedding planes of fine-grained sedimentary rocks. It is characterized by short, curvilinear, nonbranching, parallel-sided, unlined traces on bedding surfaces. It is thought to represent the submarine feeding trails of an invertebrate organism that worked the surface of muddy substrates in search of food. Because Helminthopsis traces never cross over themselves, the ichnogenus is distinguished from similar traces assigned to the Gordia ichnogenus. The similar sounding, but now obsolete, ichnogenus Helminthoida refers to a somewhat similar trace characterized by regular, back-and-forth meanders, whereas Helminthopsis is irregular.

== See also ==
- Trace fossil
- Ichnology
