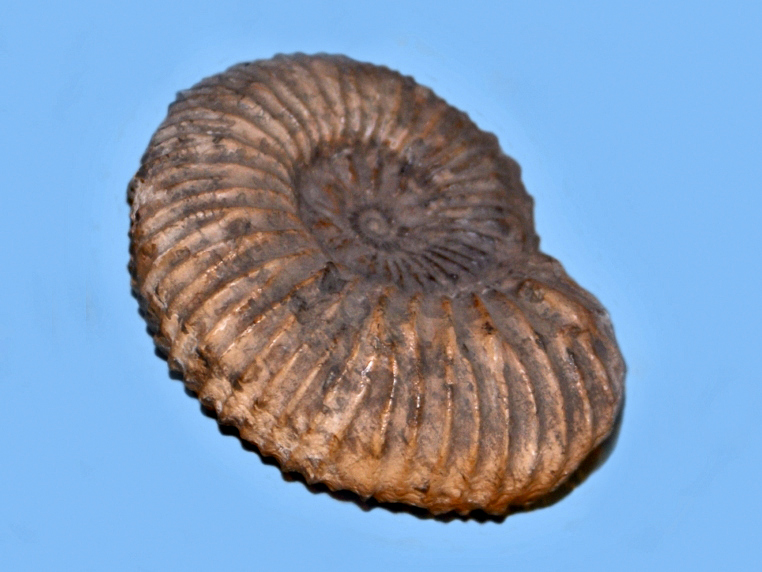
- Fossil shell of Kosmoceras spinosum from Calvados (France), on display at Galerie de paléontologie et d'anatomie comparée in Paris

Scientific classification
- Kingdom: Animalia
- Phylum: Mollusca
- Class: Cephalopoda
- Subclass: †Ammonoidea
- Order: †Ammonitida
- Superfamily: †Stephanoceratoidea
- Family: †Kosmoceratidae; Haug, 1887

Species
- Gulielmites; Kepplerites; Kosmoceras; Sigaloceras

= Kosmoceratidae =

Kosmoceratidae Temporal range: Middle Jurassic

Extinct family of ammonites

Kosmoceratidae is an extinct ammonite family from the Callovian (Middle Jurassic) to Early Cretaceous.

Kosmoceratidae are probably the most polymorphic groups of Jurassic ammonites. These ammonoids have a more or less tabulate venter, with lateral or ventrolateral tubercles. The aptychus is double valved with a concentrically ribbed surface.
