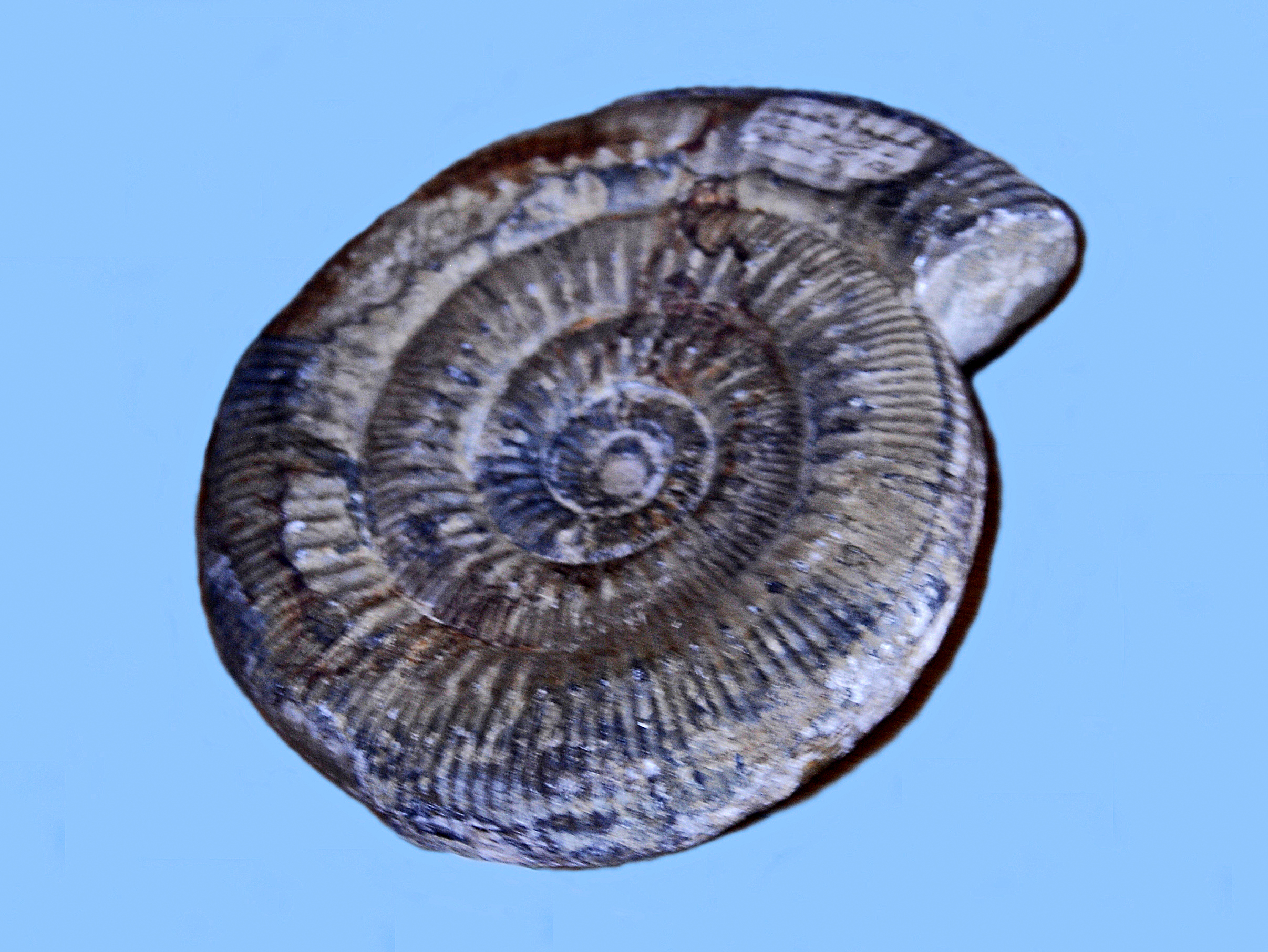
- Fossil of Skirroceras bayleanum from United Kingdom, on display at Galerie de paléontologie et d'anatomie comparée in Paris

Scientific classification
- Kingdom: Animalia
- Phylum: Mollusca
- Class: Cephalopoda
- Subclass: †Ammonoidea
- Order: †Ammonitida
- Family: †Stephanoceratidae
- Genus: †Skirroceras; Mascke, 1907

= Skirroceras =

Skirroceras Temporal range: Jurassic (Bajocian), 171.6–167.7 Ma

Genus of molluscs (fossil)

Skirroceras is a Stephanoceratoidean (ammonite) genus belonging to the family Stephanoceratidae. These fast-swimming carnivores lived during the Jurassic period, in the Bajocian age.

== Selected species ==
- Skirroceras bayleanum (Oppel, 1857)
- Skirroceras macrum (von Quenstedt)
- Skirroceras leptogyrale Buckman
