= Bathonian =

Third age of the Middle Jurassic

- 168.2 ± 1.2 – 165.3 ± 1.1 Ma

Chronology
← / Triassic–Jurassic extinction event
Subdivision of the Jurassic according to the ICS, as of 2024. Vertical axis scale: Millions of years ago

Etymology
- Name formality: Formal

Usage information
- Celestial body: Earth
- Regional usage: Global (ICS)
- Time scale(s) used: ICS Time Scale

Definition
- Chronological unit: Age
- Stratigraphic unit: Stage
- Time span formality: Formal
- Lower boundary definition: FAD of the Ammonite Gonolkites convergen
- Lower boundary GSSP: Ravin du Bès, Bas-Auran, Alpes-de-Haute-Provence, France; 43.9606°N 6.3153°E
- Lower GSSP ratified: July 2008
- Upper boundary definition: FAD of the Ammonite genus Kepplerites
- Upper boundary GSSP candidate section(s): Pfeffingen, Swabian Alb, Germany; Russia

In the geologic timescale the Bathonian is an age and stage of the Middle Jurassic. It lasted from approximately 168.2 ±1.2 Ma to around 165.3 ±1.1 Ma (million years ago). The Bathonian Age succeeds the Bajocian Age and precedes the Callovian Age.

== Stratigraphic definitions ==
The Bathonian Stage takes its name from Bath, a spa town in England built on Jurassic limestone (the Latinized form of the town name is Bathonium). The name was introduced in scientific literature by Belgian geologist d'Omalius d'Halloy in 1843. The original type locality was located near Bath. The French palaeontologist Alcide d'Orbigny was in 1852 the first to define the exact length of the stage.

The base of the Bathonian is at the first appearance of ammonite species Parkinsonia (Gonolkites) convergens in the stratigraphic column. The global reference profile for the base of the Bathonian (a GSSP) was ratified as Ravin du Bès, Bas-Auran area, Alpes de Haute Provence, France in 2009. The top of the Bathonian (the base of the Callovian Stage) is at the first appearance of ammonite genus Kepplerites.

In the Tethys domain, the Bathonian contains eight ammonite biozones:

- zone of Clydoniceras discus
- zone of Hecticoceras retrocostatum
- zone of Cadomites bremeri
- zone of Morrisiceras morrisi
- zone of Tulites subcontractus
- zone of Procerites progracilis
- zone of Procerites aurigerus
- zone of Zigzagiceras zigzag

Rocks of Bathonian age are well developed in Europe: in the northwest and southwest oolite limestones are characteristically associated with coral-bearing, crinoidal and other varieties, and with some beds of clay. In the north and northeast, Russia, etc., clays, sandstones and ferruginous oolites prevail, some of the last being exploited for iron. They occur also in the extreme north of North America and in the Arctic regions, Greenland, Franz Josef Land, etc.; in Africa, Algeria, Tanzania, Madagascar and near the Cape of Good Hope (Enon Beds); in India, Rajputana and Gulf of Kutch, and in South America.

The well-known Caen stone of Normandy and "Hauptrogenstein" of Swabia, as well as the "Eisenkalk" of northwest Germany, and "Klaus-Schichten" of the Austrian Alps, are of Bathonian age.
