= Ermoceras =

Ermoceras Temporal range: Bajocian

Scientific classification
- Kingdom: Animalia
- Phylum: Mollusca
- Class: Cephalopoda
- Subclass: †Ammonoidea
- Order: †Ammonitida
- Family: †Stephanoceratidae
- Genus: †Ermoceras; Douvillé, 1916

Species
- Ermoceras deserti Douvillé, 1916; Ermoceras inerme Douvillé, 1916

Genus of molluscs (fossil)

Ermoceras is a genus of ammonite belonging to the family Stephanoceratidae of the Middle Jurassic ( u Baj) found in deposites of central Arabia, Sinai, and Algeria with strong primary and secondary ribs and a single row of lateral tubercles; described as having a deep ventral groove

Telermoceras, with low, depressed whorls, and Kosmermoceras with high, compressed whorls are considered subgenera of Ermoceras Both are from the same time and region. Telermoceras has coarse secondary ribs and a deep umbilicus surrounded by large tubercles or spines. Kosmermocerashas fine sharp to coarse ribbing and a flattish venter

Ermoceras s.l. is derived from Arkelloceras. Westermann (1965) tentatively placed Ermoceras in the Thamboceratidae, based on sutural morphology, removing it from the Stephanoceratidae where it was previously included.
