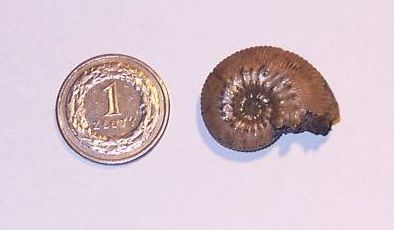
- Kosmoceras pronaie

Scientific classification
- Kingdom: Animalia
- Phylum: Mollusca
- Class: Cephalopoda
- Subclass: †Ammonoidea
- Order: †Ammonitida
- Family: †Kosmoceratidae
- Genus: †Kosmoceras; Waagen, 1869

Synonyms
- Ammonitus Waagen, 1869

= Kosmoceras =

Kosmoceras Temporal range: Callovian

Genus of molluscs (fossil)

Kosmoceras is a moderately evolute ammonite genus from the upper Callovian (Middle Jurassic) of Europe with a simple aperture and irregular ribbing interrupted by an irregular row of lateral tubercles. Strong ventral tubercles are separated by a smooth depression running along the rim.

Kosmoceras belongs to the Stephanoceratoidea and is the type genus for the Family Kosmoceratidae and for the subfamily Kosmoceratinae. Kosmoceras spinosum Waagen is the type species.

Lobokosmoceras and Gulielmiceras have been regarded as subgenera of Kosmoceras. Gulielmites is a fine-ribbed variety of Kosmoceras jason

== Species ==
This genus includes more than 100 species, including:

- K. aculeatum
- K. balticum
- K. cromptoni
- K. bizeti
- K. fibuliferum
- K. geminatum
- K. gemmatum
- K. grossouvrei
- K. interpositum
- K. jason
- K. lithuanicum
- K. medea
- K. obductum
- K. ornatum
- K. phaeinum
- K. proniae
- K. rowlstonese
- K. spinosum
- K. subnodatum
- K. weigelti

== Gallery ==
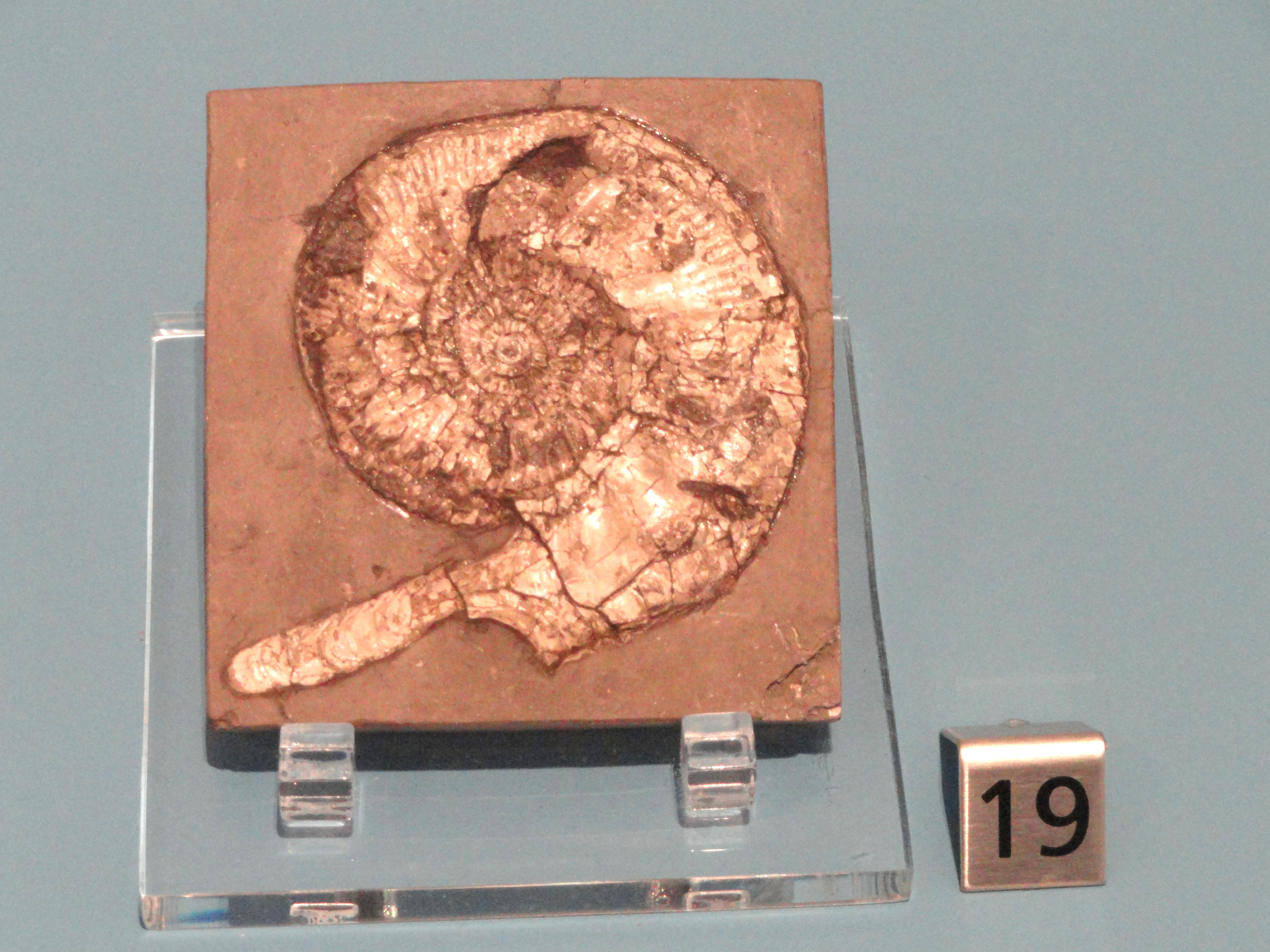
Kosmoceras cromptoni

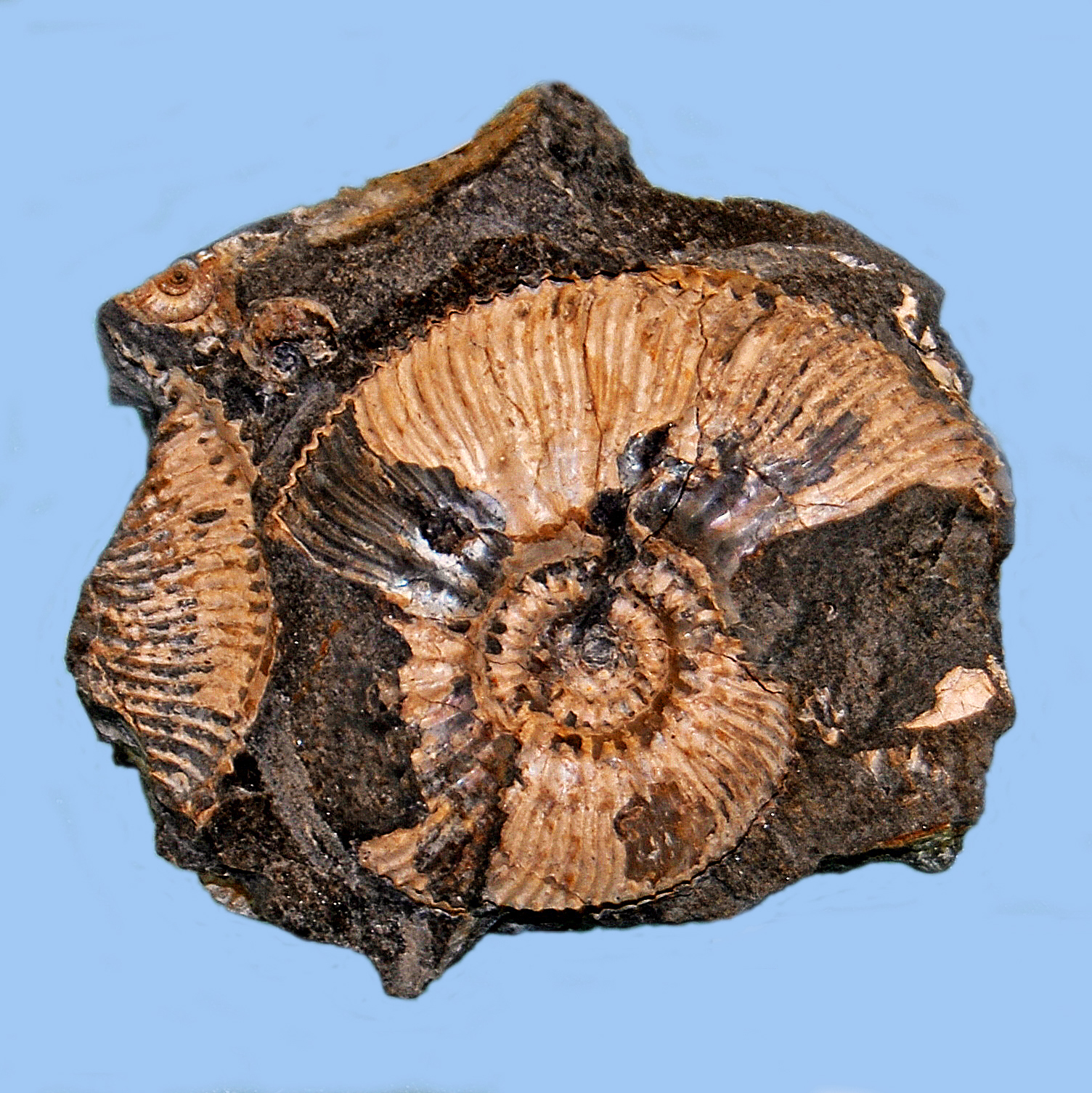
Kosmoceras jason

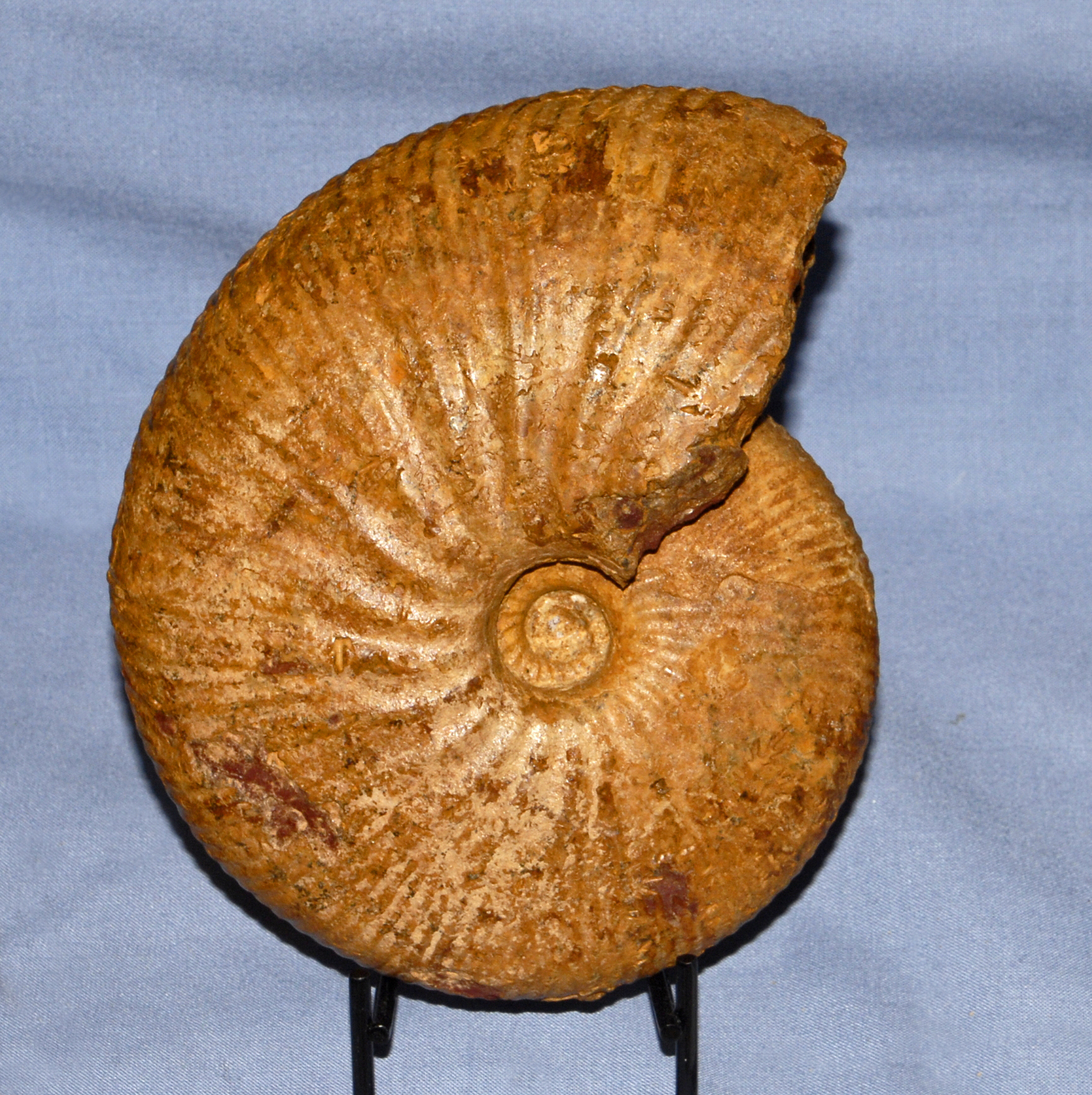
Kosmoceras medea

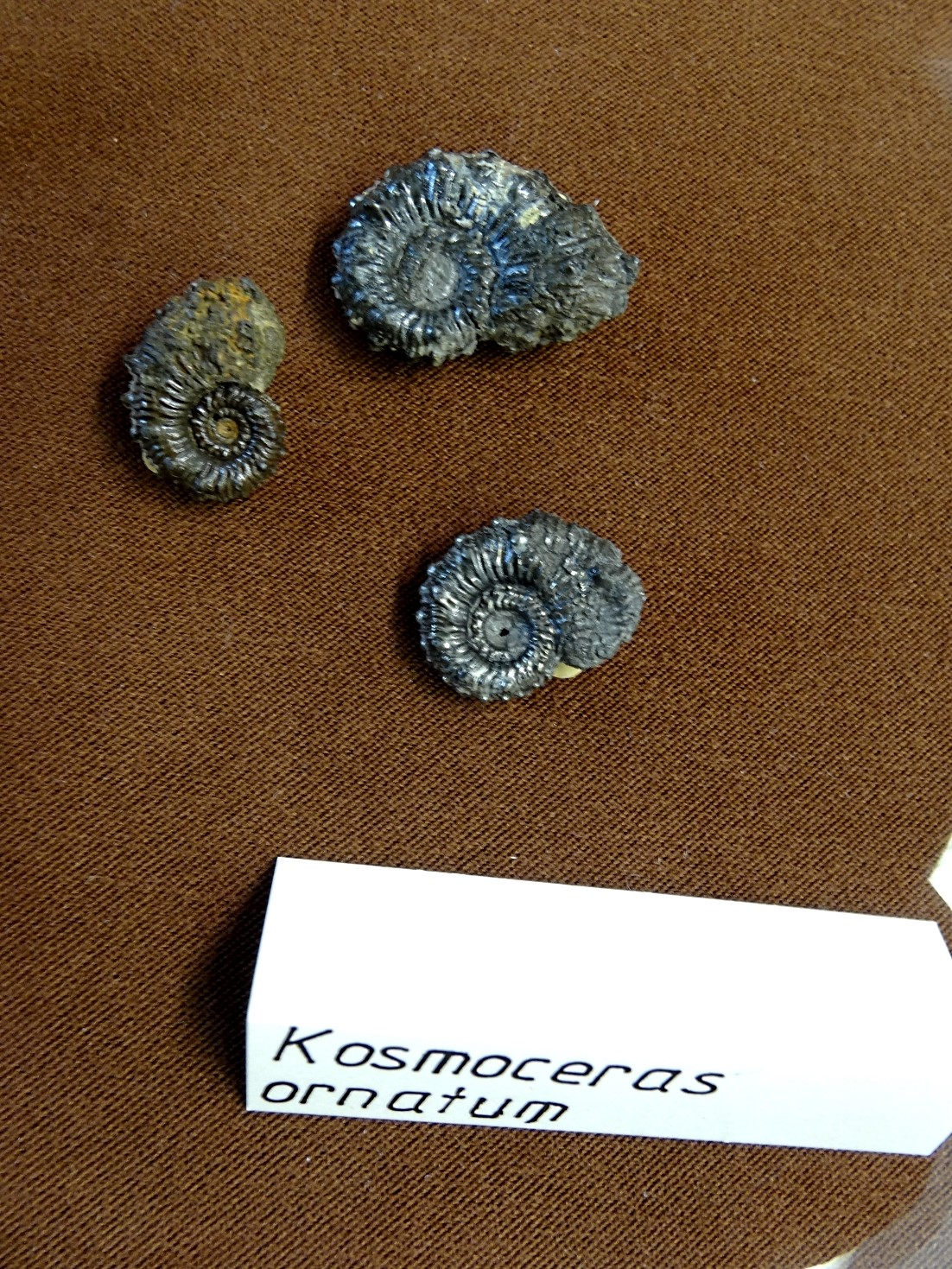
Kosmoceras ornatum
