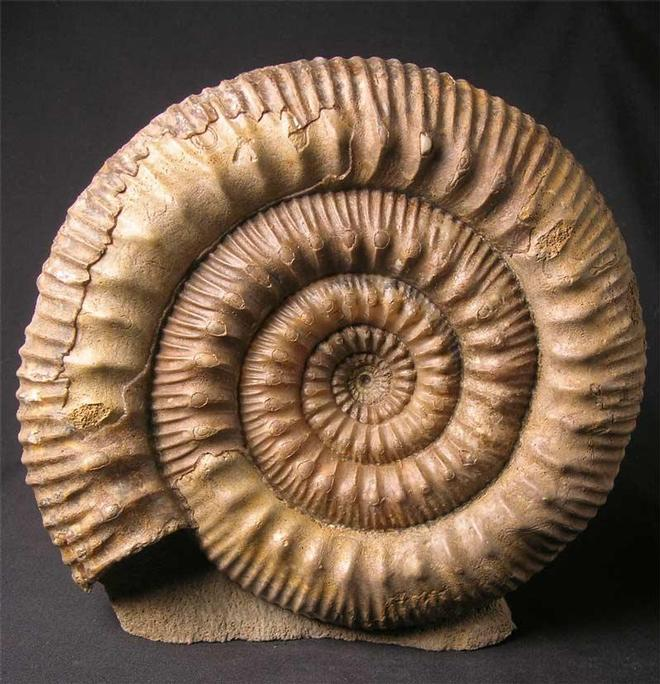
- S. humphriesianum, (lower Bajocian, Middle Jurassic), Sherborne, Dorset, UK.

Scientific classification
- Kingdom: Animalia
- Phylum: Mollusca
- Class: Cephalopoda
- Subclass: †Ammonoidea
- Order: †Ammonitida
- Family: †Stephanoceratidae
- Genus: †Stephanoceras; Waagen, 1869

= Stephanoceras =

Stephanoceras Temporal range: Aalenian–Bajocian

Genus of molluscs (fossil)

Stephanoceras (meaning crown horn) is an extinct genus of Stephanoceratoid ammonite which lived during the Bajocian (Middle Jurassic). It is the type genus of the family Stephanoceratidae.

== Type species ==
Ammonites humphriesianum J. de C. Sowerby, 1825, subsequent designation by Buchman, 1898

== Selected species ==
- S. humphriesianum (J. de C. Sowerby 1825) - Type species
- S. blagdeni (Sowerby)
- S. brodeaei (J. Sowerby)
- S. mutabile (Quenstedt 1886)
- S. umbilicum (Quenstedt 1886)
- S. nodosum (Quenstedt 1886)
- S. macrum (Quenstedt 1886)
- S. pyritosum (Quenstedt 1886)
- S. triplex Weisert
- S. freycineti (Bayle)
- S. kreter (Buckman)
- S. leptogyrale (Buckman)
- S. boulderense Imlay 1982
- S. coronatus (Bruguiere 1789)
- S. quenstedti Кoche 1939
- S. skidegatense Whiteaves 1876

== Description ==
Stephanoceras has an evolute shell, as characteristic of the family, with well-developed ribbing and tubercles. The shell is coiled so whorls barely touch in most, but some have notable overlap. Primary ribs emerge from the umbilical seam, the line marking the inner edge of the particular exposed whorl, and divide on the flanks, usually in two, occasionally in three, forming secondary ribs that cross the outer rim of the shell, known as the venter, uninterrupted. Turbercles, elevated projections, form at the ends of the primary ribs where they bifurcate or sometimes trifurcate.

Stephanoceras grew to be fairly large with a shell diameter as much as 27 cm and width as much as 6 cm across the outer whorl. Like many ammonites, Stephanoceras is dimorphic with a large, macroconch, form thought to be female and a small, microconch, form thought to be male. In most aspects the microconch is simply a smaller version of the macroconch. The primary difference lies in the aperture, which in the microconch has planar extensions on either side, lappets. That of the macroconch is generally simple, preceded by a constriction.

== Distribution ==
Fossils of Stephanoceras are found in the Jurassic marine strata of Canada, Mexico, Saudi Arabia and Spain. Some species, including S.coronatus and S.humphriesianum can also be found in rocks of the same age from England and Germany.

== Gallery ==
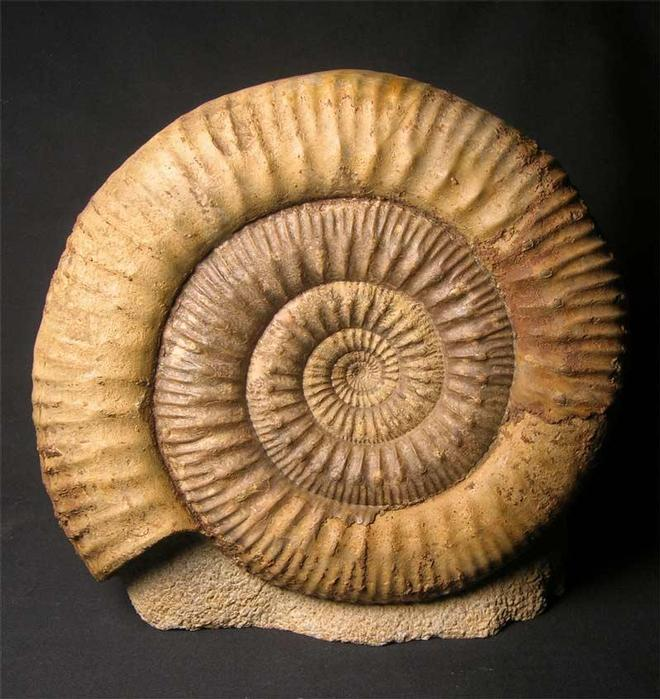
Stephanoceras humphriesianum, Jurassic, Inferior Oolite, Humphriesianum Zone, Clatcombe, Dorset, UK. Size of ammonite 275mm.

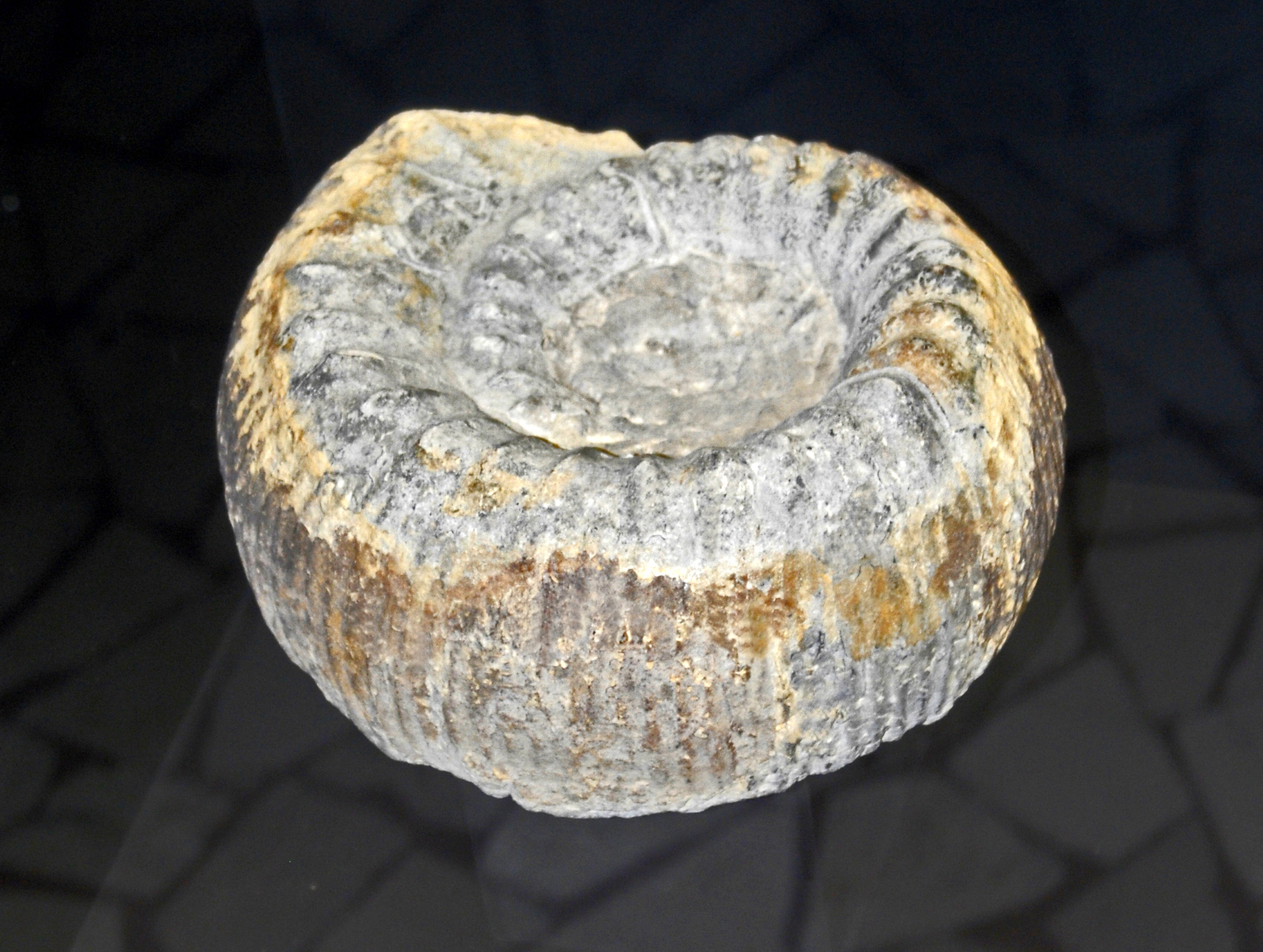
Stephanoceras blagdeni from Mid Jurassic - Germany.
