= Haplotichnus =

Trace fossil classification
- Ichnogenus: Haplotichnus; Miller, 1889

Trace fossil

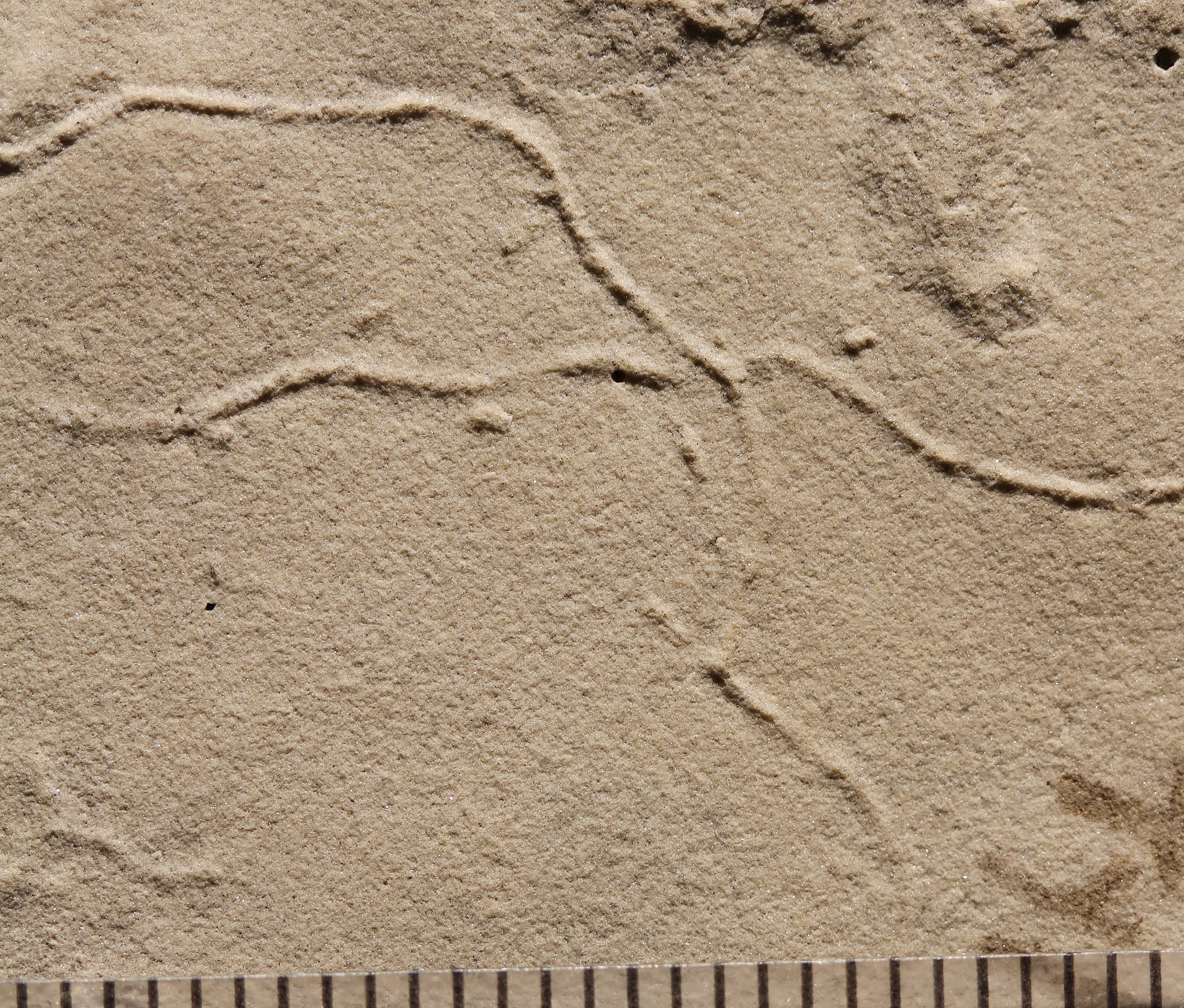
Close-up of the type specimen of Haplotichnus indianensis showing the projections at the angled turns. The projections are a diagnostic characteristic of Treptichnus bifurcus, making H. indianensis a junior subjective synonym of T. bifurcus. Scale is in mm.

Haplotichnus is an ichnogenus of invertebrate trace fossil that was erected by S.A. Miller in 1889. Buatois et al. (1998) proposed that Haplotichnus should be synonymized with Gordia because both exhibit a looping course with self-crossing. Other researchers, such as Wang et al. (2009), have maintained the distinction between the two ichnogenera because Haplotichnus has sharp bends, whereas those of Gordia are not sharp. Most recently, Getty and Bush (2016) synonymized Haplotichnus with Treptichnus due to the presence of bifurcating projections at the bends. Other features, such as the looping course of the trace, thought to distinguish Haplotichnus from Treptichnus, are actually seen in one of the syntypes of Treptichnus, further supporting Getty and Bush's (2016) synonymy.
