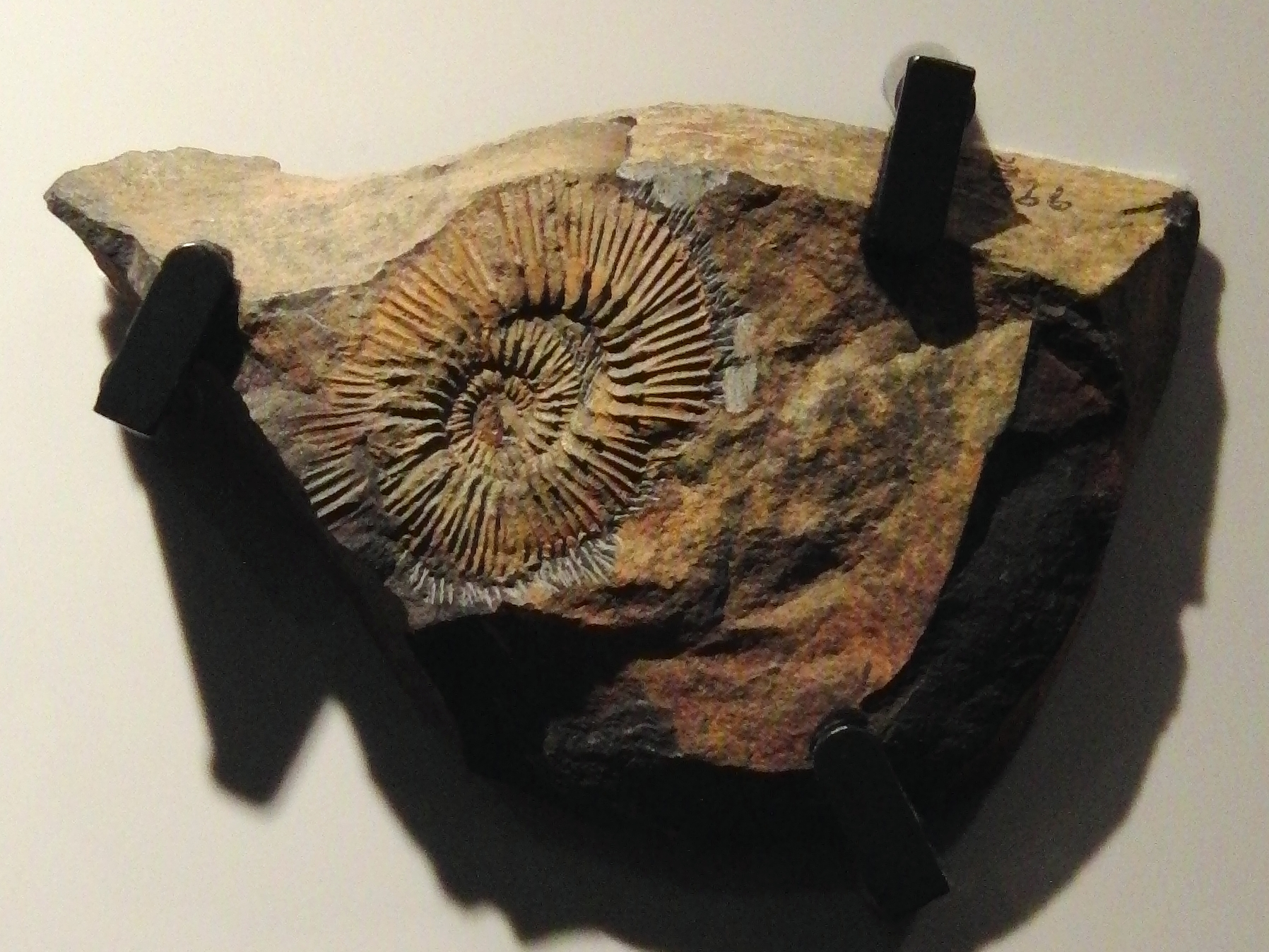
- Kepplerites japonicus from Japan

Scientific classification
- Kingdom: Animalia
- Phylum: Mollusca
- Class: Cephalopoda
- Subclass: †Ammonoidea
- Order: †Ammonitida
- Family: †Kosmoceratidae
- Genus: †Kepplerites; Neumayr & Uhlig, 1892

= Kepplerites =

Kepplerites Temporal range: Callovian

Genus of molluscs (fossil)

Kepplerites is a moderately evolute ammonite from the lower Callovian (upper Middle Jurassic) included in the Stephanoceratoidea.

Inner whorls are finely ribbed and have a flattened or grooved venter, the outer whorl has a rounded venter with smooth ribs that cross from side to side without interruption.

Kepplerites is assigned to the Kosmoceratidae and to the subfamily Keppleritinae. Gulielmina and Seymourites are closely related genera, sometimes regarded as subgenera of Kepplerites.

Kepplerites was named by Neumayr and Uhlig in 1892. The type species K keppleri is from Germany. This genus has also been found in Alaska, British Columbia, Madagascar, and Russia.

== Biostratigraphic significance ==
The International Commission on Stratigraphy (ICS) has assigned the First Appearance Datum of the genus Kepplerites as the defining biological marker for the start of the Callovian Stage of the Jurassic, 166.1 ± 1.2 million years ago.
