= Otoitidae =

Otoitidae Temporal range: Bajocian

Scientific classification
- Kingdom: Animalia
- Phylum: Mollusca
- Class: Cephalopoda
- Subclass: †Ammonoidea
- Order: †Ammonitida
- Superfamily: †Stephanoceratoidea
- Family: †Otoitidae; Mascke, 1907

Genera
- Docidoceras; Emileia; Otoites; Parsemileites

Extinct family of molluscs

Otoidtidae: stephanoceratoid ammonitina from the early Middle Jurassic that begin as cadicones but become more planualte with age; derived from the Hammitoceratidae (Hildoceratoidea), probably through Erycites by way of Abbasites.

Shells begin barrel shaped with depressed whorls, broad outer rims, and deep, crater-like umbilici—cadiconic—but become compressed, with the out rims becoming bluntly rounded—planulate. Ribbing is common; may be heavy and tuberculate on the umbilical shoulders and may divide along the flanks before crossing the outer rim -the venter- uninterrupted.

The Otoitidae is the ancestral family of the Stephanoceratoidea and is known only from a relatively short interval of time within the Bajocian stage at the beginning the Middle Jurassic and begins with Docidoceras. They gave rise, probably through varieties of Docidoceras to the Stephanoceratidae and Sphaeroceratidae, which in turn gave rise to the different phylogenetic branches within the Stephanoceratoidea.
