= Piscichnus =

Trace fossil

Piscichnus is an ichnogenus of representing trace fossils associated with fish activities.

Piscichnus is a large, plug-shaped trace fossil resembling foraging pits created by modern eagle rays. These fossils, found in shallow marine deposits, offer insights into the behavior and ecology of ancient fish.
