= Melchior Neumayr =

Austrian paleontologist

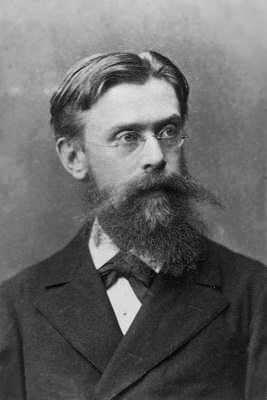
Melchior Neumayr.

Melchior Neumayr (24 October 1845 – 29 January 1890) was a palaeontologist from Austria-Hungary and the son of Max von Neumayr, a Bavarian Minister of State. He specialized on the Jurassic and Cretaceous of the Alps. Neumayr introduced the concept of the Tethys sea in 1885, calling it the Jurassic seaway. The name "Tethys" was given by his father-in-law Eduard Suess.

== Life and work ==
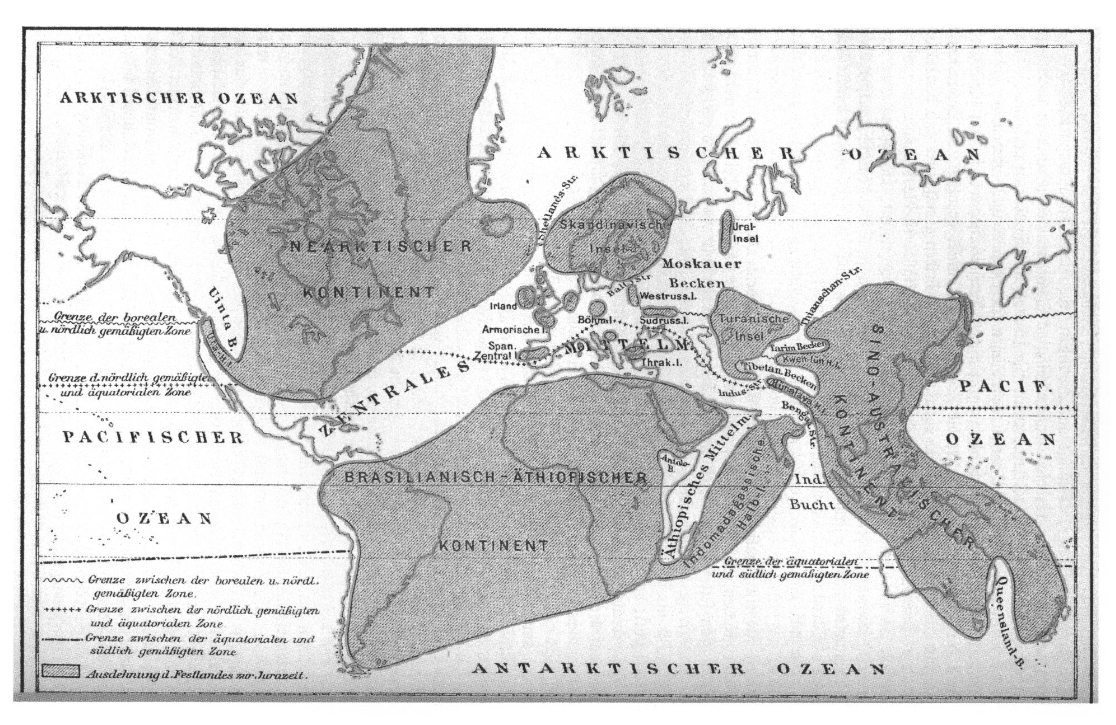
Jurassic reconstruction by Neumayr c. 1892

Neumayr was born in Munich, but grew up in Stuttgart where his father, Max von Neumayr, was an ambassador. He went to the Munich Gymnasium and then started with law studies at the Ludwig-Maximilians-Universität München, but gave it up for the natural sciences which he completed at Heidelberg University studying under Beneke and Robert Bunsen. He received a doctorate in 1867. After some experience in field-geology under Karl Wilhelm von Gümbel, he joined the Austrian geological survey in 1868. Four years later he returned to Heidelberg University, but in 1873, he was appointed professor of paleontology at the University of Vienna, and occupied this post until his death.

His more detailed researches pertained to the Jurassic and Cretaceous ammonites and to Tertiary freshwater molluscs; in these studies he sought to trace the descent of the species.

Based on the gastropod fauna, Neumayr established the idea of what he called a Jurassic seaway extending from the Caribbean to Southeast Asia (also called as the central Mediterranean) which had flooded wide tracts of Eurasia. This was named by Suess in 1893 as the Tethys, named after the sister of Okeanos, the Greek ocean god.

He dealt also with the zones of climate during the Jurassic and Cretaceous periods. He postulated the idea that during those periods, equatorial marine fauna differed from that of the two temperate zones, and that the marine fauna of the latter two zones also differed from that of the arctic zone, much as the faunas of similar zones differ from each other in the present day; see his Über klimatische Zonen während der Jura und Kreidezeit (Denkschr. K. Akad. Wiss. Wien, 1883); he was author also of Erdgeschichte (2 vols, 1887); and Die Stämme des Thierreiches (vol. 1 only, 1889).

Neumayr married Paula, daughter of his colleague Eduard Suess in 1879 and they had three daughters. He was a keen climber and was a member of the Deutscher und Oesterreich Alpin Verein but gave up membership in 1872 and in later life heart problems prevented him from outdoor activity but he continued to write in the Mittheilungen of the Deutscher und Oesterreich Alpin Verein.
