= Karl von Schrenck von Notzing =

Bavarian politician

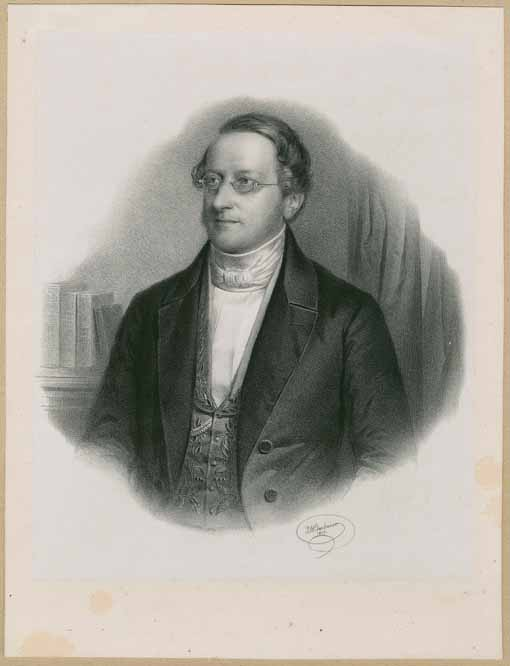
Karl von Schrenck of Notzing (1853)

Karl Ignatz Freiherr von Schrenck (17 August 1806 – 10 September 1884) was a Bavarian administrative lawyer and a deputy in Bavaria who served for a time as Minister-President of Bavaria.

== Life ==
Born in Roding, Germany, Schrenck the son of Judge and Minister of Justice Sebastian Freiherr von Schrenck von Notzing Schrenck attended the (present) Wilhelmsgymnasium Munich. After graduating in 1823, he studied at the Ludwig-Maximilians-Universität in Landshut until 1826, when he moved with the university to Munich, now named the Ludwig-Maximilians-Universität München. In 1827, he became active with his brother Eduard in Corps Palatia Munich.

After the exams he entered the Bavarian civil service. In 1845/46 he served as district president of Rheinpfalz, on the left bank of the Rhine. 1846/47 he was the successor of his father Bavarian Minister of Justice and 1847 briefly Minister of Church Affairs. Ludwig I. (Bavaria) dismissed him for signing a memorandum against Lola Montez. In February 1847 he was President of the Government in the Upper Palatinate. Already in April he was put to the disposition. In 1849/50 he was President of the Government of Lower Bavaria.

In the German Revolution 1848/1849 he was elected to the Frankfurt National Assembly, to which he belonged from 18 May 1848 to 7 May 1849 in the Café Milani. He spoke out against the election of Frederick William IV to the German Kaiser. In 1866, he was the last president of the Bundestag. From 1850 to 1859 he was a Bavarian envoy at the Bundestag (German Confederation).

From 1859 to 1864 he was Minister of State of the Royal House and of Foreign Affairs, Chairman of the Council of Ministers and Minister of State of Commerce and Public Works. Under Ludwig II. He was from 1864 to 1866 (the time of the first wars of unification) again Bundestag Messenger. From February 1868 to the Reichstag election in 1871 he sat in the Reichstag of the North German Confederation and thus in the Customs Parliament. At the time of the Franco-Prussian War he was ambassador to Austria-Hungary. He retired in 1871.

== Literature ==
- Karl Theodor von Heigel: Schrenck von Notzing, Karl Freiherr. In: General German Biography (ADB). Vol. 32, Duncker & Humblot, Leipzig 1891, pp. 485–488.
- Walter Schärl: The composition of the Bavarian civil service from 1806 to 1918. Lassleben, Kallmünz 1955 (= Munich historical studies, abbot Bavarian history, volume 1)
- Wilhelm Kosch, continued by Eugen Kuri: Biographisches Staatshandbuch. Francke, Bern[ua] 1963.
- Erika Bosl: Schrenck von Notzing, Karl von. In: Karl Bosl (ed.): Bosl's Bavarian biography. Pustet, Regensburg 1983, ISBN 3-7917-0792-2, p. 701 (digitized ).
- Heinrich Best, Wilhelm Weege: Biographical Handbook of the Members of the Frankfurt National Assembly 1848/49 (= Handbooks on the History of Parliamentarism and Political Parties, Volume 8). Droste, Dusseldorf 1996, ISBN 3-7700-5193-9.
- Walther Killy and Rudolf Vierhaus (ed.): German Biographical Encyclopaedia. Volume 9, Saur, Munich[ua] 1998.
