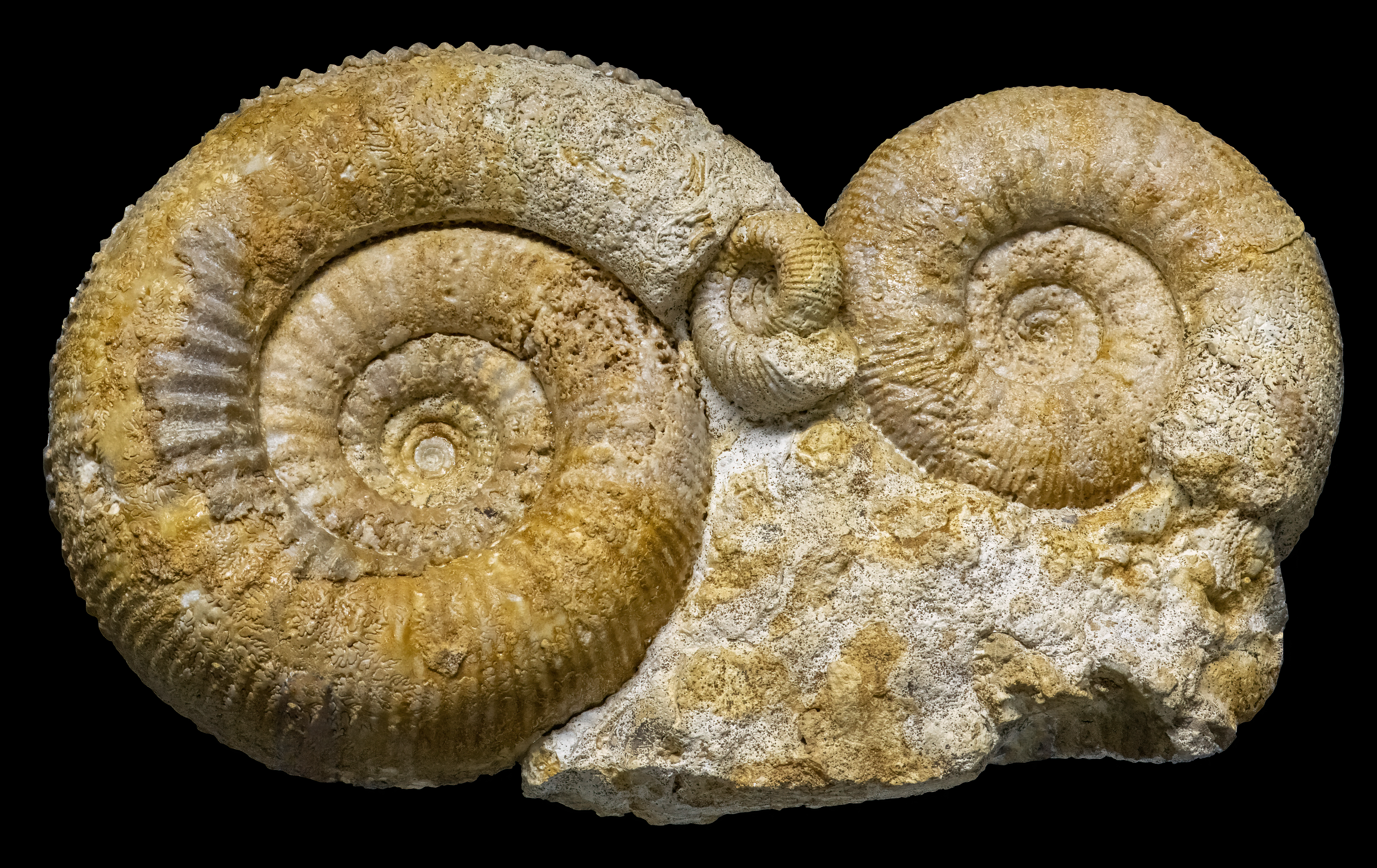
- Cadomites species fossil

Scientific classification
- Kingdom: Animalia
- Phylum: Mollusca
- Class: Cephalopoda
- Subclass: †Ammonoidea
- Order: †Ammonitida
- Suborder: †Ammonitina
- Superfamily: †Stephanoceratoidea; Neumayr, 1875

Families
- See text

= Stephanoceratoidea =

Stephanoceratoidea Temporal range: Middle Jurassic–Upper Jurassic

Extinct superfamily of molluscs

Stephanoceratoidea, formerly Stephanocerataceae, is a superfamily of middle- upper Jurassic ammonoid cephalopods within the order Ammonitida containing diverse forms, generally with sharp ribbing and complex suture lines. Aptychi are believed to be mostly granular (Granulaptycus) or concentrically ribbed on the surface (Praestriaptychus) (Arkell et al. 1957)

== Morphologic variation ==
The shells of the Stephanoceratoidea, which determine the different included families, are highly variable in form. They are discoidal and evolute with all whorls exposed, spheroidal and involute with only the outer whorl showing, cadiconic with a deep umbilicus and broad ventral margin, and oxiconic with the ventral margin sharp. They are united by being generally sharply ribbed and by their complex suture lines with a dominant 1st lateral lobe and a well-developed umbilical lobe. (Arkell et al. 1957)

== Taxonomy ==
Stephanoceratoidea contains five families according to Donovan et al. (1981), a reduction from the 11 listed in the Treatise on Invertebrate Paleontology, 1957 Part L. They are the:

- Stephanoceratidae
- Kosmoceratidae
- Otoitidae
- Sphaeroceratidae
- Cardioceratidae

The Pachyceratidae and Tulitidae included in the Stephanoceratoidea in the Treatise (1957) are reassigned to the Perisphinctoidea. The Macrocephalotidae and Mayaitidae of the Treatise are reduced to subfamilies within the Sphaeroceratidae, Macrocephalitinae and Mayaitinae, but still in the Stephanoceratoidea. The Clydoniceratidae and Thamboceratidae are combined as the Clydoniceratinae within the Hildoceratoid family Oppeliidae.

== Phylogeny ==
According to Donovan et al (1981), the Stephanoceratidae and Otoitdae both have their origin in the Hildoceratoidea, in the Phymatoceratidae. The Otoitidae gave rise to the Sphaeroceratidae which gave rise to the Cardioceraticae, the Stephanoceratidae to the Kosmoceratidae, all within the Stephanoceratoidea. The Stephanoceratidae, accordingly, also gave rise to the Perisphinctidae, root stock of the Perisphictoidea.

This differs from the older phylogeny of the Treatise Part L the Stephanoceratoidea are thought to be derived from the Hammatoceratidae (Hildoceratoidea) through the ancestral family, the Otoitidae which gave rise in the early Middle Jurassic to the Stephanoceratidae and Sphaeroceratidae, forming two main lineages. The Stephanoceratidae gave rise to the Thamboceratidae which in turn gave rise to the Clydoniceratidae. The Sphaeroceratidae gave rise to the Tulitidae which is the source for both the Macrocephalitidae and the Pachyceratidae. The Pachyceratidae lead to the Mayitidae, the Macrocephalitidae both the Kosmoceratidae and Cardioceratidae.
