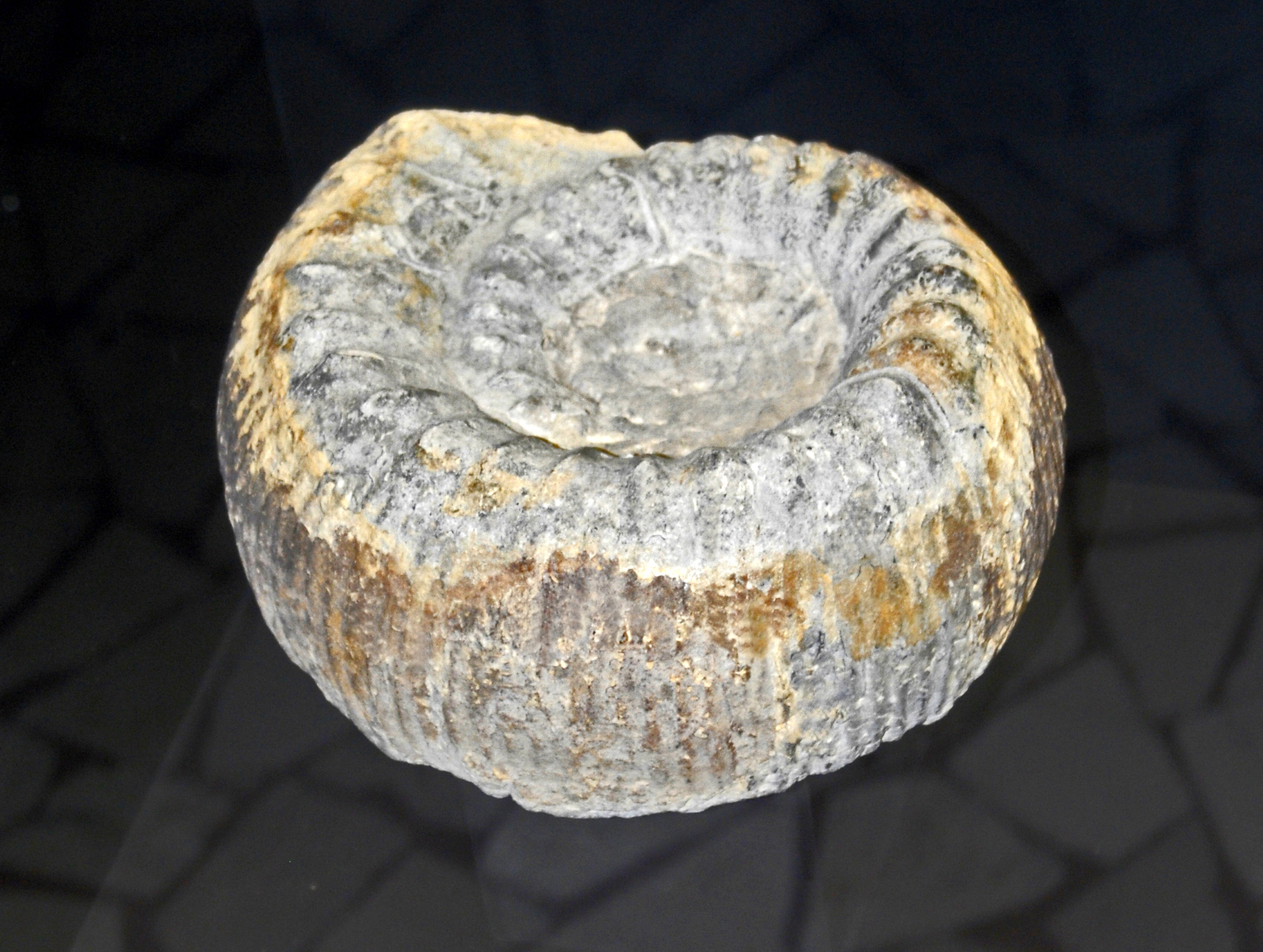
- Stephanoceras blagdeni from Mid Jurassic - Germany

Scientific classification
- Kingdom: Animalia
- Phylum: Mollusca
- Class: Cephalopoda
- Subclass: †Ammonoidea
- Order: †Ammonitida
- Superfamily: †Stephanoceratoidea
- Family: †Stephanoceratidae; Neumayr 1875

Subfamilies
- See text

= Stephanoceratidae =

Stephanoceratidae Temporal range: Middle Jurassic–Upper Jurassic

Extinct family of ammonites

Stephanoceratidae is a family of planulate and coronate ammonites within the Stephanoceratoidea. Shells are evolute so that all whorls are exposed and have strong ribbing that bifurcates, that is splits in two, on the flanks. Many have tubercles at the point of bifurcation. Whorl sections are generally subequant; the outer rim, or venter, commonly rounded.

Stephanoceratidae is derived from the Otoitidae. Their fossils are found in upper Middle- and lower Upper Jurassic sediments.

== Subfamilies and genera ==
- Cadomitinae
- Frebolditinae
- Garantianinae
- Mollistephaninae
- Stephanoceratinae
- Ermoceras
- Kosmermoceras
- Kumatostephanus
- Skirroceras
- Skolekostephanus
- Stemmatoceras
- Telermoceras
