= List of Brachys species =

This is a list of species in Brachys, a genus of metallic wood-boring beetles in the family Buprestidae.

== Brachys species ==
- Brachys acutus Kerremans, 1903^{c g}
- Brachys aequinoctialis Gory, 1841^{c g}
- Brachys aerosus (Melsheimer, 1845)^{i c g b}
- Brachys aeruginosus Gory, 1841^{i c g b}
- Brachys alboundulatus Obenberger, 1937^{c g}
- Brachys amazonicus Kerremans, 1896^{c g}
- Brachys amphissus Obenberger, 1941^{c g}
- Brachys anthrenoides Waterhouse, 1889^{c g}
- Brachys apachei Knull, 1952^{i c g b}
- Brachys apicillus Obenberger, 1937^{c g}
- Brachys assimilatus Obenberger, 1922^{c g}
- Brachys aurulans Kerremans, 1896^{c g}
- Brachys barberi Fisher, 1924^{i c g b}
- Brachys bellus Fisher, 1922^{c g}
- Brachys bolivianus Obenberger, 1937^{c g}
- Brachys bruchi Kerremans, 1903^{c g}
- Brachys cantareirae Obenberger, 1923^{c g}
- Brachys capitatus Obenberger, 1934^{c g}
- Brachys carinellus Kerremans, 1896^{c g}
- Brachys carinicollis Kirsch, 1873^{c g}
- Brachys catharinae Obenberger, 1917^{c g}
- Brachys cayennensis Obenberger, 1937^{c g}
- Brachys cephalicus Schaeffer, 1909^{i c g b}
- Brachys coelestis Kerremans, 1897^{c g}
- Brachys coeruleifrons Obenberger, 1937^{c g}
- Brachys confusus Fisher, 1922^{c g}
- Brachys cordieri Obenberger, 1924^{c g}
- Brachys corniger Migliore, 2026
- Brachys crassiceps Obenberger, 1937^{c g}
- Brachys cuprifrons Fisher, 1922^{c g}
- Brachys cuprinus Kerremans, 1897^{c g}
- Brachys cyaneoniger Kerremans, 1897^{c g}
- Brachys cyanicollis Kerremans, 1896^{c g}
- Brachys danae Obenberger, 1941^{c g}
- Brachys delicatulus Obenberger, 1923^{c g}
- Brachys deliciosus Obenberger, 1923^{c g}
- Brachys depressus Kerremans, 1903^{c g}
- Brachys dimidiatus Waterhouse, 1889^{c g}
- Brachys distinctus Waterhouse, 1889^{c g}
- Brachys elegans Fisher, 1922^{c g}
- Brachys exquisitus Hespenheide *in* Westcott, *et al*., 2008^{c g}
- Brachys fasciatus Kerremans, 1896^{c g}
- Brachys fasciferus Schwarz, 1878^{i c g b}
- Brachys festivus Kerremans, 1899^{c g}
- Brachys fleischeri Obenberger, 1937^{c g}
- Brachys floccosus Mannerheim, 1837^{i c g b}
- Brachys floricola Kerremans, 1900^{c g}
- Brachys fluviatillis Obenberger, 1937^{c g}
- Brachys frontalis Kerremans, 1896^{c g}
- Brachys fulgidus Fisher, 1922^{c g}
- Brachys fulvus Kerremans, 1897^{c g}
- Brachys gebhardti Obenberger, 1937^{c g}
- Brachys glabromaculatus Obenberger, 1937^{c g}
- Brachys gounellei Kerremans, 1897^{c g}
- Brachys granulicollis Obenberger, 1941^{c g}
- Brachys gregori Obenberger, 1937^{c g}
- Brachys guatemalensis Obenberger, 1937^{c g}
- Brachys guttulatus Mannerheim, 1837^{c g}
- Brachys hexagonalis Dugès, 1891^{c g}
- Brachys hintoni Fisher, 1933^{c g}
- Brachys hofferi Obenberger, 1937^{c g}
- Brachys howdeni ^{b}
- Brachys humeralis Kerremans, 1897^{c g}
- Brachys imperatrix Obenberger, 1937^{c g}
- Brachys incolus Obenberger, 1923^{c g}
- Brachys ineditus Kerremans, 1896^{c g}
- Brachys ingae Kogan, 1964^{c g}
- Brachys insignis Kerremans, 1899^{c g}
- Brachys intervallorum Hespenheide, 1990^{c g}
- Brachys jakobsoni Obenberger, 1937^{c g}
- Brachys jalapae Obenberger, 1937^{c g}
- Brachys kleinei Obenberger, 1939^{c g}
- Brachys kratochvili Obenberger, 1937^{c g}
- Brachys laetus Waterhouse, 1889^{c g}
- Brachys latipennis Obenberger, 1923^{c g}
- Brachys lebasii Gory & Laporte, 1840^{c g}
- Brachys lineatus Kerremans, 1897^{c g}
- Brachys lineifrons Fisher, 1933^{c g}
- Brachys lineiger Kerremans, 1899^{c g}
- Brachys luteosignatus Obenberger, 1937^{c g}
- Brachys marialicae Cazier, 1951^{c g}
- Brachys marmoreus Kerremans, 1903^{c g}
- Brachys mirabilis Kerremans, 1899^{c g}
- Brachys monnei Migliore, 2026
- Brachys mositanus Fisher, 1925^{c g}
- Brachys mrazi Obenberger, 1923^{c g}
- Brachys mutabilis Gory, 1841^{c g}
- Brachys nevermanni Fisher, 1929^{c g}
- Brachys nigricans Kerremans, 1897^{c g}
- Brachys nigrofasciatus Kerremans, 1896^{c g}
- Brachys nigroviridis Fisher, 1922^{c g}
- Brachys nodifer Kerremans, 1903^{c g}
- Brachys nodosus Kerremans, 1897^{c g}
- Brachys obscurus Gory, 1841^{c g}
- Brachys occidentalis Obenberger, 1923^{c g}
- Brachys ornatus Fisher, 1922^{c g}
- Brachys ovatus (Weber, 1801)^{i c g b}
- Brachys palaeno Obenberger, 1941^{c g}
- Brachys paraguayensis Obenberger, 1923^{c g}
- Brachys paulensis Obenberger, 1923^{c g}
- Brachys pauligenus Obenberger, 1937^{c g}
- Brachys pedicularius Gory, 1841^{c g}
- Brachys pictus Kerremans, 1897^{c g}
- Brachys pilosus Fisher, 1922^{c g}
- Brachys planticolus Obenberger, 1937^{c g}
- Brachys planus Gory, 1841^{c g}
- Brachys pretiosus Kerremans, 1897^{c g}
- Brachys pulverosus Waterhouse, 1889^{c g}
- Brachys purpuratus Kerremans, 1897^{c g}
- Brachys pusillus Obenberger, 1923^{c g}
- Brachys querci Knull, 1952^{i c g b}
- Brachys regularis Thomson, 1878^{c g}
- Brachys rileyi ^{b}
- Brachys robustus Hespenheide, 1990^{c g}
- Brachys roseifasciatus Obenberger, 1923^{c g}
- Brachys rudis Kerremans, 1896^{c g}
- Brachys rugosulus Obenberger, 1923^{c g}
- Brachys sanctus Obenberger, 1937^{c g}
- Brachys scapulosus Chevrolat, 1838^{c g}
- Brachys schmidti Obenberger, 1939^{c g}
- Brachys scintillus Obenberger, 1923^{c g}
- Brachys simiolus Obenberger, 1923^{c g}
- Brachys simoni Kerremans, 1896^{c g}
- Brachys simplex Waterhouse, 1889^{c g}
- Brachys speculiferus Obenberger, 1941^{c g}
- Brachys strandi Obenberger, 1937^{c g}
- Brachys suavis Kerremans, 1900^{c g}
- Brachys taciturnus Kerremans, 1900^{c g}
- Brachys takanus Fisher, 1925^{c g}
- Brachys tesselatus (Fabricius, 1801)^{i c g}
- Brachys thomae Fisher, 1925^{c g}
- Brachys tovaricus Kerremans, 1896^{c g}
- Brachys transversus Kerremans, 1899^{c g}
- Brachys triangularis Thomson, 1879^{c g}
- Brachys tricinctus (Fabricius, 1801)^{c g}
- Brachys tuberculifer Kerremans, 1896^{c g}
- Brachys valkai Obenberger, 1923^{c g}
- Brachys varicolor Gory & Laporte, 1840^{c g}
- Brachys vicinus Kerremans, 1903^{c g}
- Brachys virgo Obenberger, 1941^{c g}
- Brachys viridans Kerremans, 1896^{c g}
- Brachys zavadili Obenberger, 1937^{c g}
- Brachys zavreli Obenberger, 1937^{c g}
- Brachys zeteki Fisher, 1933^{c g}
- Brachys zikani Obenberger, 1923^{c g}
- Brachys zonalis Kerremans, 1897^{c g}

Data sources: i = ITIS, c = Catalogue of Life, g = GBIF, b = Bugguide.net
