= El Pedregal Formation =

Geological formation in Spain

- Stratigraphic range: Aalenian-Bajocian 174–170 Ma
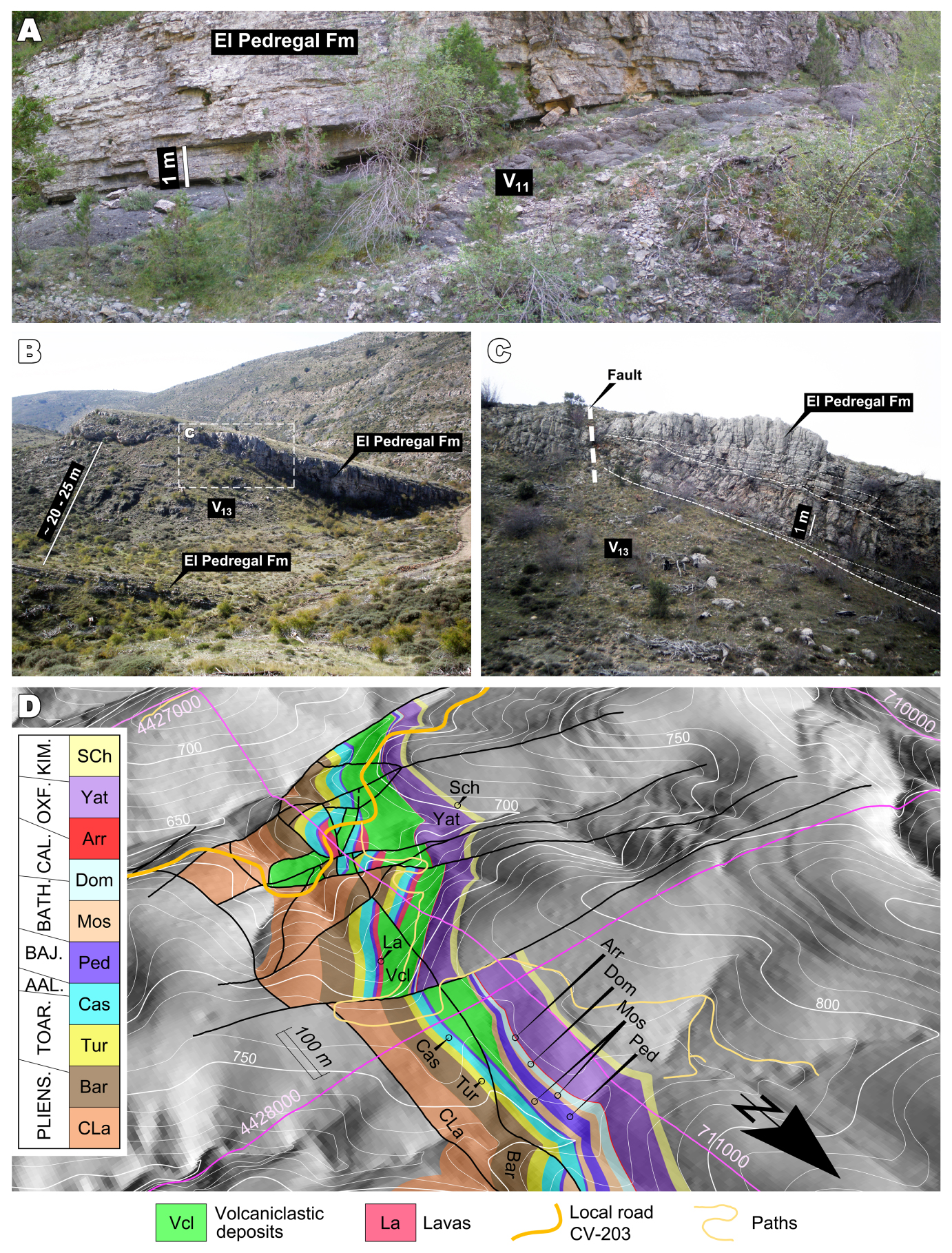
- Onlap stratal terminations of the El Pedregal Formation against the flank of a volcanic mound in Camarena de la Sierra
- Type: Geological formation
- Underlies: Moscardón Formation
- Overlies: Casinos Formation; Turmiel Formation
- Area: Levantine sector
- Thickness: >150 m

Lithology
- Primary: Mudstone limestones and wakestone limestones

Location
- Location: Levantine sector
- Coordinates: 40°10′27.1”N 1°00′50.7”W
- Region: Iberian Basin
- Country: Spain

Type section
- Thickness at type section: ~150 m (490 ft)
- El Pedregal Formation (Spain)

The El Pedregal Formation is a geological formation of Aalenian-Bajocian (Middle Jurassic) age in the Iberian Basin in the Iberian Peninsula. This is allocated in the East-Iberian area, that during the Middle Jurassic was part of a Carbonate platform system, influenced by tectonic activity and fault lines, along the Iberian and Catalan Coastal mountain ranges of Spain, with an exposure of up to 500 km. This carbonates are allocated on the Chelva Group, that was network of carbonate platforms, with shallow areas forming around elevated blocks created by tectonic forces. Deeper marine environments developed between these blocks, which were likely connected to the open ocean. The Internal Castilian Platform was linked to the Iberian Massif, while the El Maestrazgo High separated two marine platforms: the External Castilian and Aragonese. Further to the northeast, the Tortosa Platform was bordered by the Tarragona High and Catalan Massif to the north and the El Maestrazgo High to the south. The Beceite Strait acted as a transition zone between the Aragonese and Tortosa platforms.

== Paleoenvironment ==
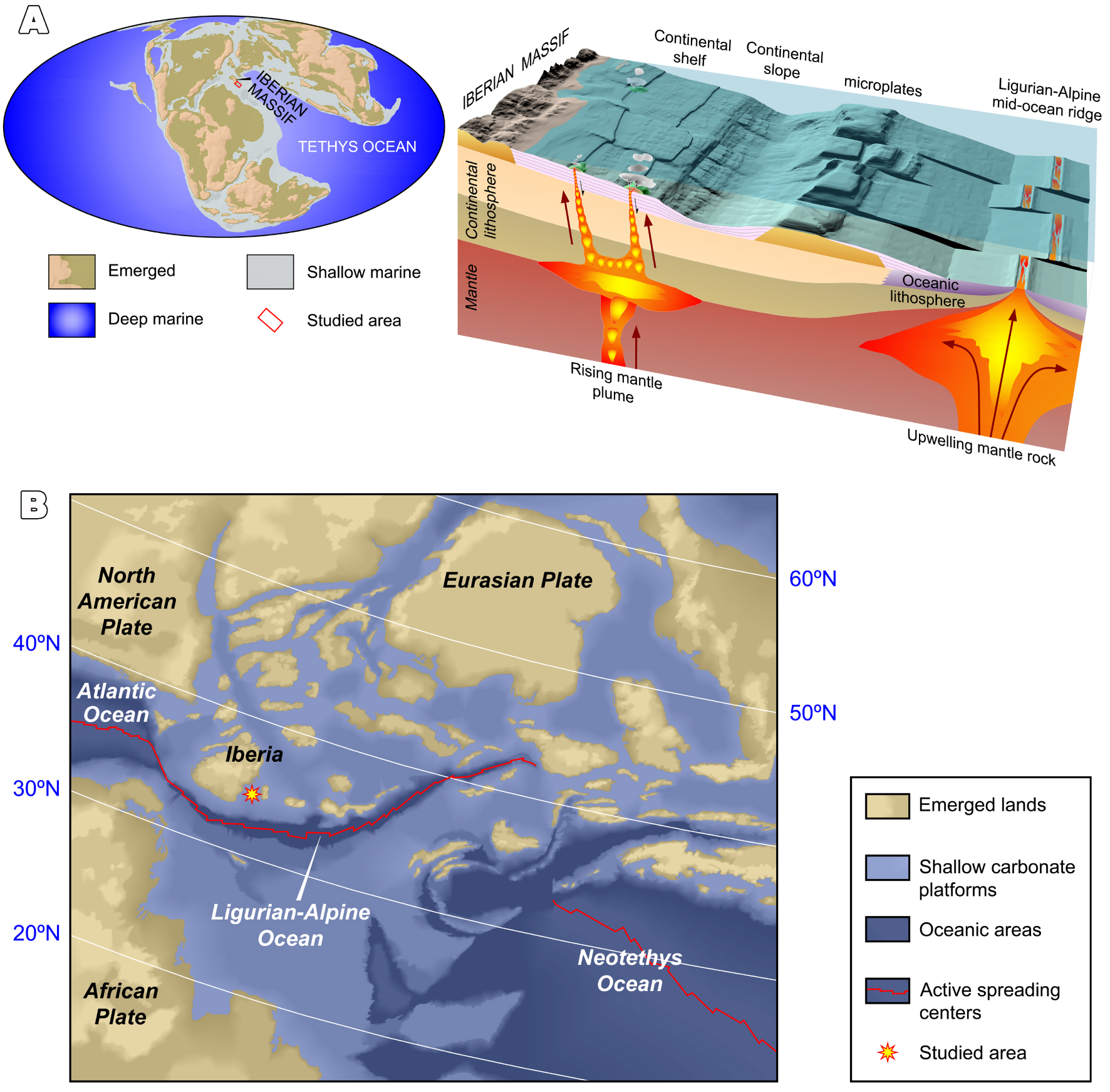
Paleogeography of the area in the Middle Jurassic

The El Pedregal Formation lithology is dominated by mudstone and wackestone limestones with fine sediments, including microfilaments, echinoderm fragments, and pellets, with less important sequences with interbedded marls, which are indicative of a low-energy marine environment. Associated with a shallow carbonate sea, sequences of this formation developed on a confined lagoon, relatively shallow and protected from direct oceanic influence by a volcanoclastic barrier.

This lagoon was developed adjacent to or inside an ephemeral volcanic island, shielded from ocean waves by deposits of volcanic materials. Within these calm lagoon settings, carbonate sediments mixed with fine particles that contained plant fossils, preserving evidence of plant-insect interactions, with a low diversity of plants, mainly cycadophytes and ferns. Occasionally, storm events would disrupt nearby oyster banks, carrying marine debris, including oysters, into the lagoons, sometimes interspersed with plant remains.

This ephemeral island/islands were situated more than 150 km from the nearest mainland, the Catalan and Iberian Massifs. Following the lagoonal deposits, considered of early Aalenian age, a large regional transgression in the late Aalenian impacted the local platform, connecting the Proto-Atlantic Ocean with the Western Tethys Ocean. Latter in the Bajocian the area evolved into a shallow external marine platform with frequent emersions.

Pelagic/open marine sequences are also common within the formation, including the "Albarracinites beds". At The Masada Toyuela site taphonomic patterns indicate two contrasting sedimentary environments, with taphonomic populations dominating in shallow-water settings, marked by reworked and abraded ammonite molds and chambers under slow sediment accumulation punctuated by rapid episodes due to currents and sediment bypassing. Conversely, deeper, sediment-starved areas feature "type 1" taphonomic populations, characterized by juvenile, undamaged ammonites within homogeneous molds, typical of condensed deposits from transgressive phases.

Latter in the Bajocian, the central Iberian Basin featured open marine platforms shaped by extensional tectonics, with siliceous sponge (Hexactinellids & Lithistida)-microbial buildups thriving in relatively deep, oligotrophic to mesotrophic domains.

== Fossil Content ==
Color key: Taxon / Reclassified taxon / Taxon falsely reported as present / Dubious taxon or junior synonym / Ichnotaxon / Ootaxon / Morphotaxon

Notes
Uncertain or tentative taxa are in small text
~~crossed out~~ taxa are discredited.

=== Ichnofossils ===
Genus	Species	Location	Made by	Images
Thalassinoides	isp.	Widespread across the formation	Actinopteri; Anomura; Decapoda; Dipnoi; Polychaeta; Sipuncula	Thalassinoides from France
Zoophycos	(Cancellophycus) ispp.	Widespread across the formation	Arenicolidae; Capitellidae; Sipuncula; Spionida; Echinoidea	Zoophycos fossil from Kentucky

=== Brachiopoda ===
Genus	Species	Location	Material	Notes	Images
Prionorhynchia	P. rubrisaxensis	Abejuela outcrop	Isolated shells	An Brachiopod of the family Prionorhynchiidae	
Pseudogibbirhynchia	P. mutans	Abejuela outcrop	Isolated shells	An Brachiopod of the family Basiliolidae	

=== Mollusca ===
Genus	Species	Location	Material	Notes	Images
Abbasites	A. spp.	Caudiel outcrop; Pina-Barracas.1; Pina-Barracas.2; Sarrión.1; Sarrión.2	Isolated shells	An Ammonite of the family Erycitidae	
Abassitoides	A. spp.	Pina-Barracas.2; Sarrión.1; Sarrión.2	Isolated shells	An Ammonite of the family Erycitidae	
Albarracinites	A. albarraciniensis	Masada Toyuela; Cea de Abarracín; Moscardon; Vibei	Isolated shells	An Ammonite of the family Stephanoceratidae	
Ambersites	A. spp.	Caudiel outcrop	Isolated shells	An Ammonite of the family Hammatoceratoidea	
Apedogyria	A. spp.	Pina-Barracas.2; Sarrión.3	Isolated shells	An Ammonite of the family Graphoceratidae	
Brasilia	B. spp.	Caudiel outcrop; Pina-Barracas.1; Pina-Barracas.2; Sarrión.1; Sarrión.2; Sarrión.3	Isolated shells	An Ammonite of the family Graphoceratidae	
Chondroceras	C. spp.	Pina-Barracas.1	Isolated shells	An Ammonite of the family Sphaeroceratidae	
Elatmites	E. spp.	Caudiel outcrop	Isolated shells	An Ammonite of the family Perisphinctidae	
Eudmetoceras	E. spp.	Caudiel outcrop; Pina-Barracas.1	Isolated shells	An Ammonite of the family Hammatoceratoidea	
Euhoploceras	E. spp.	Pina-Barracas.2; Sarrión.1; Sarrión.2	Isolated shells	An Ammonite of the family Sonniniidae	
Epalxites	E. spp.	Pina-Barracas.1	Isolated shells	An Ammonite of the family Sphaeroceratidae	
Fontannesia	F. ssp.	Caudiel outcrop	Isolated shells	An Ammonite of the family Sonniniidae	
Graphoceras	G. garantiana; G. spp.	Caudiel outcrop; Lécera; Pina-Barracas.1; Pina-Barracas.2; Sarrión.1; Sarrión.2	Isolated shells	An Ammonite of the family Graphoceratidae	Graphoceras specimen
Haplopleuroceras	H. mundum; H. subspinatum; H. crassum; H. spp.	Caudiel outcrop; Pina-Barracas.1; Pina-Barracas.2; Sarrión.1; Sarrión.2	Isolated shells	An Ammonite of the family Hammatoceratoidea	
Leptosphinctes	L. spp.	Caudiel outcrop	Isolated shells	An Ammonite of the family Perisphinctidae	Leptosphinctes specimen
Ludwigella	L. spp.	Caudiel outcrop; Pina-Barracas.1; Pina-Barracas.2; Sarrión.1; Sarrión.2	Isolated shells	A Bivalve of the family Graphoceratidae	
Macrocephalites	M. spp.	Caudiel outcrop	Isolated shells	An Ammonite of the family Macrocephalitidae	Macrocephalites specimen
Oppelia	O. sauzei; O. spp.	Moneva; Pina-Barracas.1	Isolated shells	An Ammonite of the family Oppeliidae	Oppelia specimen
Rhodaniceras	O. spp.	Caudiel outcrop	Isolated shells	An Ammonite of the family Hammatoceratoidea	
Pleydellia	P. aalensis; P. mactra; P. fluens; P. subcomp; P. ssp.	Caudiel outcrop	Isolated shells	An Ammonite of the family Hildoceratidae	
Sonninia	S. spp.	Sarrión.1; Sarrión.2; Sarrión.3	Isolated shells	An Ammonite of the family Sonniniidae	
Spiroceras	S. spp.	Caudiel outcrop	Isolated shells	An Ammonite of the family Spiroceratidae	Spiroceras specimen
Stemmatoceras	S. spp.	Pina-Barracas.1	Isolated shells	An Ammonite of the family Stephanoceratidae	
Stephanoceras	S. humphriesianum; S. propinquans; S. niortense; S. spp.	Moneva; Moscardón; Pina-Barracas.1	Isolated shells	An Ammonite of the family Stephanoceratidae	Stephanoceras specimen
Toxamblyites	T. spp.	Pina-Barracas.1	Isolated shells	An Ammonite of the family Haploceratidae	
Westermannites	W. ssp.	Pina-Barracas.2; Sarrión.1; Sarrión.2	Isolated shells	An Ammonite of the family Sphaeroceratidae	

=== Annelida ===
Genus	Species	Stratigraphic position	Material	Notes	Images
Schistomeringos	S. expectatus; S. spp.	TE-620 road	Isolated scolecodonts	A polychaete of the family Dorvilleidae. Unlike the modern counterparts that live in deeper environments, this species is found linked with shallow marine facies	Extant specimen of the same genus

=== Decapoda ===
Genus	Species	Stratigraphic position	Material	Notes	Images
Iberophthalmus	I. leceraensis	Lécera	MPZ 2025/303, an almost complete carapace	A Crab of the family Longodromitidae.	
Tanidromites	T. ciceroides; T. monevaensis; T. cf. monevaensis; T. cf. raboeufi; ?T. sp.	Lécera; Moneva	Multiple carapaces; MPZ 2025/314 & MPZ 2025/315–320; MPZ 2025/321 & 46 specimens	A Crab of the family Tanidromitidae.	

=== Insecta ===
Foliar remains with insect interactions are common, including traces of margin feeding, Hole feeding, mining, oviposition, piercing and sucking and surface feeding. Due to be located adjacent to an isolated island, the Camarena locality insect biota likely wasn't too specialized, with generalists more likely to adapt to these environments and inflict similar damage.

Modern equivalents capable of leave similar patterns in extant cycadophytes include caterpillars from genera like Eumaeus (Lycaenidae) and Chilades, along other lepidopteran families, such as Tineidae, Nymphalidae, and Erebidae. Other insects capable of attack cycads include Hemipterans like Aulacaspis yasumatsui or the beetle Brachys cleidecostae (Buprestidae).

Type	Location	Material	Made By	Images
Hole Feeding	TE-620 road	Circular to ellipsoidal or elongate holes punched through leaf tissue	Coleoptera and Lepidoptera as main producers; similar to modern cycad herbivores like Lycaenidae caterpillars.	Modern example of Hole feeding
Margin Feeding	TE-620 road	Arc-shaped or irregular excisions along leaf edges	Primarily Coleoptera (e.g., Orsodacnidae, Languriidae, Aulacoscelis in Chrysomelidae) and Lepidoptera (e.g. Eumaeus or Chilades); generalist herbivores adapting to tough cycad leaves.	Eumaeus caterpillar margin feeding
Mining	TE-620 road	Spiral gallery. Indicates larval tunneling within leaf tissue	Coleoptera (e.g., Buprestoidea like Brachys); also possible Lepidoptera, Diptera, or Hymenoptera.	Modern Brachys feeding
Oviposition	TE-620 road	Egg-shaped scars, ovoid or semicircular, often on rachis.	Lepidoptera (primitive moths); also possible Odonata or Coleoptera.	Odonatan on leaf
Piercing and Sucking	TE-620 road	Circular depression with central depression	Hemiptera (e.g., Aulacaspis-like scales).	Extant Aulacaspis on a cycad
Surface Feeding	TE-620 road	Scraping or abrasion of leaf epidermis leaving "worn" areas	Coleoptera (e.g., Aulacoscelis, Orsodacnidae, Languriidae); reminiscent of modern cycad specialists but likely generalists.	

=== Bryophyta ===
Genus	Species	Stratigraphic position	Material	Notes	Images
Foveosporites	F. visscheri	TE-620 road	Miospores	Incertae sedis; affinities with Bryophyta.	
Interulobites	I. spp	TE-620 road	Miospores	Incertae sedis; affinities with Bryophyta.	
Polycingulatisporites	P. circulus	TE-620 road	Miospores	Incertae sedis; affinities with Bryophyta.	

=== Lycophyta ===
Genus	Species	Stratigraphic position	Material	Notes	Images
Leptolepidites	L. macroverrucous; L. sp	TE-620 road	Miospores	Affinities with the family Lycopodiaceae in the Lycopodiopsida.	
Lycopodiacidites	L. rugulatus	TE-620 road	Miospores	Affinities with the family Lycopodiaceae in the Lycopodiopsida.	Extant Lycopodium specimens
Staplinisporites	S. caminus	TE-620 road	Miospores	Affinities with the family Lycopodiaceae in the Lycopodiopsida.	
Uvaesporites	U. argenteaeformis	TE-620 road	Miospores	Affinities with the Selaginellaceae in the Lycopsida.	

=== Pteridophyta ===
Genus	Species	Stratigraphic position	Material	Notes	Images
Biretisporites	B. potoniaei	TE-620 road	Miospores	Affinities with the families Schizaeaceae/Anemiaceae inside Pteridophyta	Extant Anemia specimens
Baculatisporites	B. comaumensis	TE-620 road	Miospores	Affinities with the family Osmundaceae in the Polypodiopsida.	Extant Osmunda specimens
Cibotiumspora	C. jurienensis; C. juncta	TE-620 road	Miospores	Affinities with the family Cyatheaceae and Dicksoniaceae in the Cyatheales. Arboreal fern spores.	
Contignisporites	C. sp.	TE-620 road	Miospores	Affinities with the families Schizaeaceae/Anemiaceae inside Pteridophyta	
Deltoidospora	D. toralis; D. spp.	TE-620 road	Miospores	Affinities with the family Cyatheaceae and Dicksoniaceae in the Cyatheales. Arboreal fern spores.	
Dictyophyllidites	D. sp.	TE-620 road	Miospores	Affinities with Matoniaceae/Weichseliaceae in the Gleicheniales.	
Echinasporis	E. sp.	TE-620 road	Miospores	Incertae sedis; affinities with the Pteridophyta	
Gleicheniidites	G. senonicus	TE-620 road	Miospores	Affinities with the Gleicheniales in the Polypodiopsida. Fern spores from low herbaceous flora.	Extant Gleichenia
Granulatisporites	G. sp.	TE-620 road	Miospores	Incertae sedis; affinities with the Pteridophyta	
Ischyosporites	I. crateris; I. marburgensis	TE-620 road	Miospores	Affinities with the families Schizaeaceae/Anemiaceae inside Pteridophyta	
Kekryphalospora	K. sp. cf. K. distincta	TE-620 road	Miospores	Affinities with the families Schizaeaceae/Anemiaceae inside Pteridophyta	
Klukisporites	K. variegatus; K. spp.	TE-620 road	Miospores	Affinities with the family Lygodiaceae in the Polypodiopsida. K. variegatus is the 2nd most abundant palynomorph (20%)	Extant Lygodium
Leptolepidites	L. macroverrucosus; L. sp.	TE-620 road	Miospores	Affinities with the family Dennstaedtiaceae in the Polypodiales. Forest fern spores.	Extant Dennstaedtia specimens
Lycopodiacidites	L. rugulatus	TE-620 road	Miospores	Affinities with the Ophioglossaceae in the Filicales. Fern spores from lower herbaceous flora.	Extant Helminthostachys specimens
Manumia	M. irregularis	TE-620 road	Miospores	Incertae sedis; affinities with the Pteridophyta	
Matonisporites	M. phlebopteroides	TE-620 road	Miospores	Affinities with Matoniaceae in the Gleicheniales.	
Osmundacidites	O. wellmani	TE-620 road	Miospores	Affinities with the family Osmundaceae in the Polypodiopsida.	
Skarbysporites	S. crassexinius	TE-620 road	Miospores	Incertae sedis; affinities with the Pteridophyta	
Todisporites	T. major	TE-620 road	Miospores	Affinities with the family Osmundaceae in the Polypodiopsida.	

=== Cycadophytes ===
Genus	Species	Stratigraphic position	Material	Notes	Images
Cycadopites	C. cf. carpentier; C. follicularis	TE-620 road	Pollen	Affinities with the family Cycadaceae in the Cycadales and with Bennettitales.	Extant Cycas platyphylla
Cycadophyta indet.	Indeterminate	TE-620 road	Multiple Leaflets	Affinities with Cycadales in the Cycadopsida. The local macroflora is dominated by Cycadophytes	
Monosulcites	M. minimus	TE-620 road	Pollen	Affinities with Cycadales in the Cycadopsida.	

=== Coniferophyta ===
Genus	Species	Stratigraphic position	Material	Notes	Images
Araucariacites	A. australis	TE-620 road	Pollen	Affinities with Araucariaceae in the Pinales. The Camarena palynoflora is dominated by Araucariacites australis (58%)	Extant Araucaria.
Callialasporites	C. turbatus	TE-620 road	Pollen	Affinities with the family Araucariaceae in the Pinales. Conifer pollen from medium to large arboreal plants.	Extant Araucaria.
Classopollis	C. classoides	TE-620 road	Pollen	Affinities with the Hirmeriellaceae in the Pinopsida.	
Sciadopityspollenites	S. macroverrucosus; S. spp.	TE-620 road	Pollen	Affinities with both Sciadopityaceae and Miroviaceae in the Pinopsida. This pollen's resemblance to extant Sciadopitys suggest that Miroviaceae may be an extinct lineage of Sciadopityaceae-like plants.	Extant Sciadopitys.
Spheripollenites	S. psilatus	TE-620 road	Pollen	Affinities with the Hirmeriellaceae in the Pinopsida.	

== See also ==
- Rotzo Formation, Italy
- Marne di Monte Serrone, Italy
- Calcare di Sogno, Italy
- Podpeč Limestone, Slovenia
- Aganane Formation, Morocco
- Calcaires du Bou Dahar, Morocco
- Tafraout Group, Morocco
- Budoš Limestone, Montenegro
- Cañadón Asfalto Formation, Argentina
- Los Molles Formation, Argentina
- Mawson Formation, Antarctica
- Kandreho Formation, Madagascar
- Kota Formation, India
- Cattamarra Coal Measures, Australia
