= Subcollina =

Subcollina Temporal range: Middle Jurassic

Scientific classification
- Kingdom: Animalia
- Phylum: Mollusca
- Class: Cephalopoda
- Subclass: †Ammonoidea
- Order: †Ammonitida
- Family: †Spiroceratidae
- Genus: †Subcollina; Spath, 1925

Genus of molluscs (fossil)

Subcollina is a genus of evolute to serpenticonic stephanoceratoidean ammonites from the Middle Jurassic (Baj) of Mexico, placed in the family Spiroceratidae.

The whorl section of Subcollina is subquadrate, slightly depressed in the inner whorls, slightly compressed at the mature aperture. The inner whorls are covered with fine, dense, primary ribs that become widespread and thicker on the outer whorls, terminating in ventrolateral tubercles from which two or sometimes three secondary ribs extend that cross the venter in a regular zig-zag pattern.

Subcollina is probably derived from the Stephanoceratidae. Some stephanoceratids also have the zig-zag pattern of Subcollina. Related genera include Parastrenoceras, Strenoceras, and Spiroceras.

Note that the described zig-zag pattern in the secondary ribs as they cross the venter may be hard to make out in fig 32 of Sandoval and Westermann (1986)
