= Parastrenoceras =

Parastrenoceras Temporal range: Bajocian

Scientific classification
- Kingdom: Animalia
- Phylum: Mollusca
- Class: Cephalopoda
- Subclass: †Ammonoidea
- Order: †Ammonitida
- Family: †Spiroceratidae
- Genus: †Parastrenoceras

Parastrenoceras is an extinct genus from the ammonoid cephalopod order Ammonitida, included in the family Spiroceratidae that lived during the Bajocian stage of the Middle Jurassic.

Shells of Parastrenoceras are strongly evolute with a subrectangular to subcircular whorl section, generally prominent ribbing, and two rows of tubercles on either side located ventrally and ventrolaterally.

Parastrenoceras is found immediately above Subcollina in Oaxaca, Mexico and may be descended directly from it. The two agree in the coiling, cross section of the inner whorls, and zigzag pattern of the secondary ribs. Parastrenoceras differs in having two rows of tubercles per side, rather than one, and that the primary ribs on the outer whorls may slope dorso-ventrally forward. Parastrenoceras is also closely related to Spiroceras which, except for its uncoiling, shares many of the same features.

== Distribution ==
Mexico and Germany.
