= Xenocephalites =

Xenocephalites Temporal range: Middle Jurassic

Scientific classification
- Domain: Eukaryota
- Kingdom: Animalia
- Phylum: Mollusca
- Class: Cephalopoda
- Subclass: †Ammonoidea
- Order: †Ammonitida
- Family: †Macrocephalitidae
- Genus: †Xenocephalites; Spath, 1928

Genus of molluscs (fossil)

Xenocephalites is an extinct genus of ammonoid cephalopods from the late Middle Jurassic belonging to the stephanoceratoid family Macrocephalitidae. It is known from southern Alaska, Greenland, Mexico, and Argentina.

Xenocephalites can be recognized by its coarsely ribbed, prominently umbilicate, involute shell where in ribs are widely splayed, tending to bifurcate high on the flanks. Macrocephalites is similar except that its ribbing is finer and more dense. In both the ribbing crosses uninterrupted over the venter.
