= Indocephalites =

Indocephalites Temporal range: Callovian

Scientific classification
- Kingdom: Animalia
- Phylum: Mollusca
- Class: Cephalopoda
- Subclass: †Ammonoidea
- Order: †Ammonitida
- Family: †Macrocephalitidae
- Genus: †Indocephalites; Spath, 1926

Extinct genus of molluscs

Indocephalites is a true ammonite (order Ammonitida) and a possible subgenus of Macrocephalites, belonging to the stephanoceratacean family, Macrocephalitidae. Inner whorls form a cadicone (a barrel shape), outer become more compressed and smoother. Ribs are simple, crossing the venter straight and uninterrupted. Pleurocephalites, another possible subgenus of Macrocephalites, is quite similar.

== Distribution ==
Jurassic deposits of China, France, India and Madagascar
