= Brachys corniger =

Scientific classification
- Kingdom: Animalia
- Phylum: Arthropoda
- Clade: Pancrustacea
- Class: Insecta
- Order: Coleoptera
- Suborder: Polyphaga
- Infraorder: Elateriformia
- Family: Buprestidae
- Genus: Brachys
- Species: B. corniger

Binomial name
- Brachys corniger Migliore, 2026

Species of beetle

Brachys corniger is a species of beetle of the family Buprestidae. It is found in Brazil (Mato Grosso).

== Description ==
Adults reach a length of about 4 mm (0.16 in). The vertex is dark brown and covered by long and thick ferruginous setae and with two prominent horn-like apophyses. The antennae are dark brown with golden reflections. The pronotum is dark brown with violaceous reflections, sparsely covered with white and ferruginous setae and with a tuft of yellow pubescence on each side above the scutellum. The elytra are dark brown with irregular transverse fasciae of white and yellow setae at the base, in the middle, at the apical three-fourths, and at the apices, and with denser yellow setae at the apices. The legs are dark brown.

== Etymology ==
The species name is derived from Latin corniger (meaning horn bearer).
