= Brachys festivus =

Scientific classification
- Domain: Eukaryota
- Kingdom: Animalia
- Phylum: Arthropoda
- Class: Insecta
- Order: Coleoptera
- Suborder: Polyphaga
- Infraorder: Elateriformia
- Family: Buprestidae
- Genus: Brachys
- Species: B. festivus

Binomial name
- Brachys festivus Kerremans, 1899

Species of beetle

Brachys festivus is a species of metallic wood-boring beetle in the family Buprestidae.
