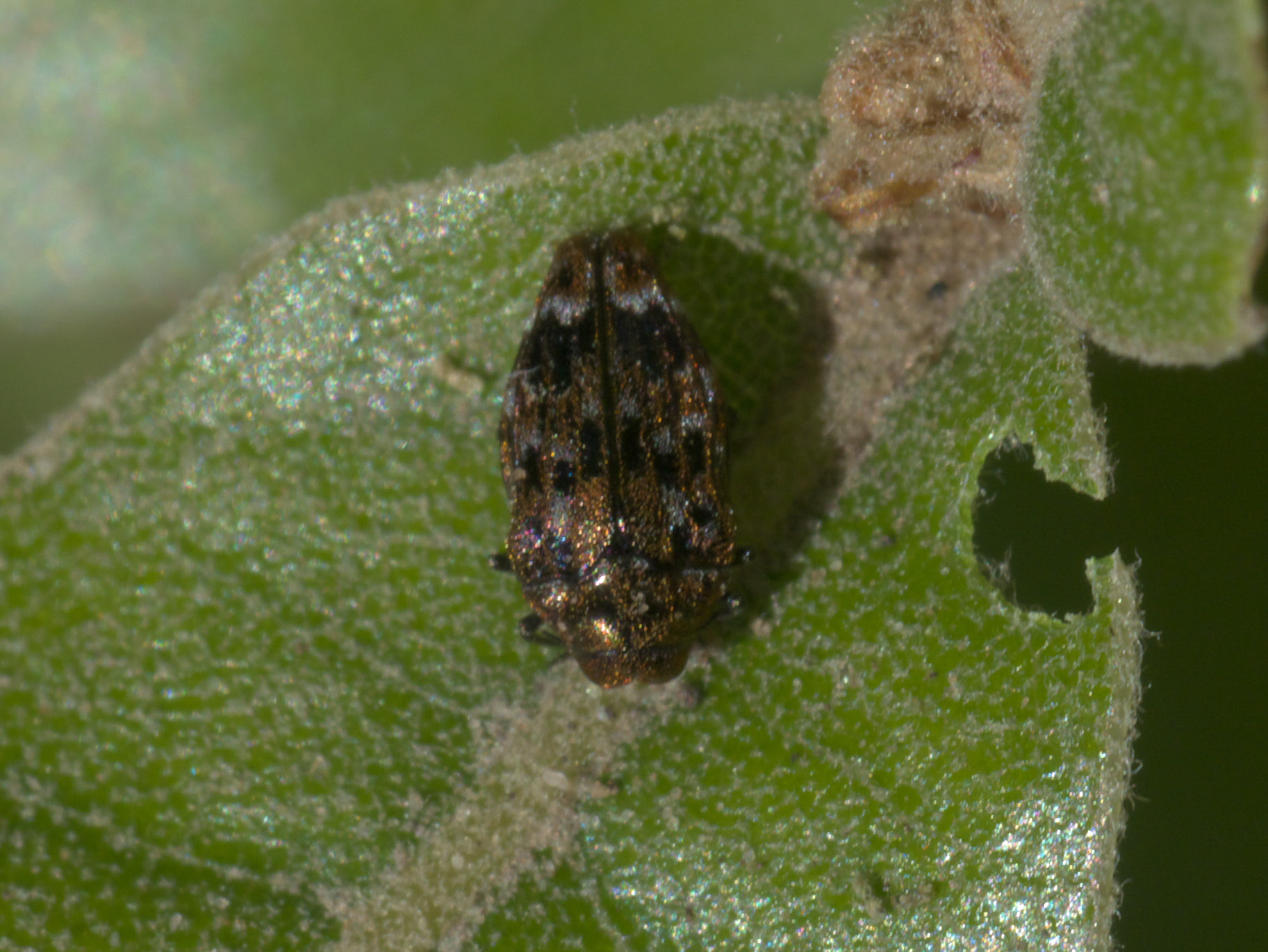

Scientific classification
- Domain: Eukaryota
- Kingdom: Animalia
- Phylum: Arthropoda
- Class: Insecta
- Order: Coleoptera
- Suborder: Polyphaga
- Infraorder: Elateriformia
- Family: Buprestidae
- Genus: Brachys
- Species: B. ovatus

Binomial name
- Brachys ovatus (Weber, 1801)

Synonyms
- Brachys aurulenta (Kirby, 1837); Brachys bellporti Nicolay and Weiss, 1923; Brachys horni Kerremans, 1896; Brachys laevicauda LeConte, 1860; Brachys molestus Gory, 1841; Brachys terminans Gory and Laporte, 1840

= Brachys ovatus =

Species of beetle

Brachys ovatus is a species of metallic wood-boring beetle in the family Buprestidae. It is found in Central America and North America.

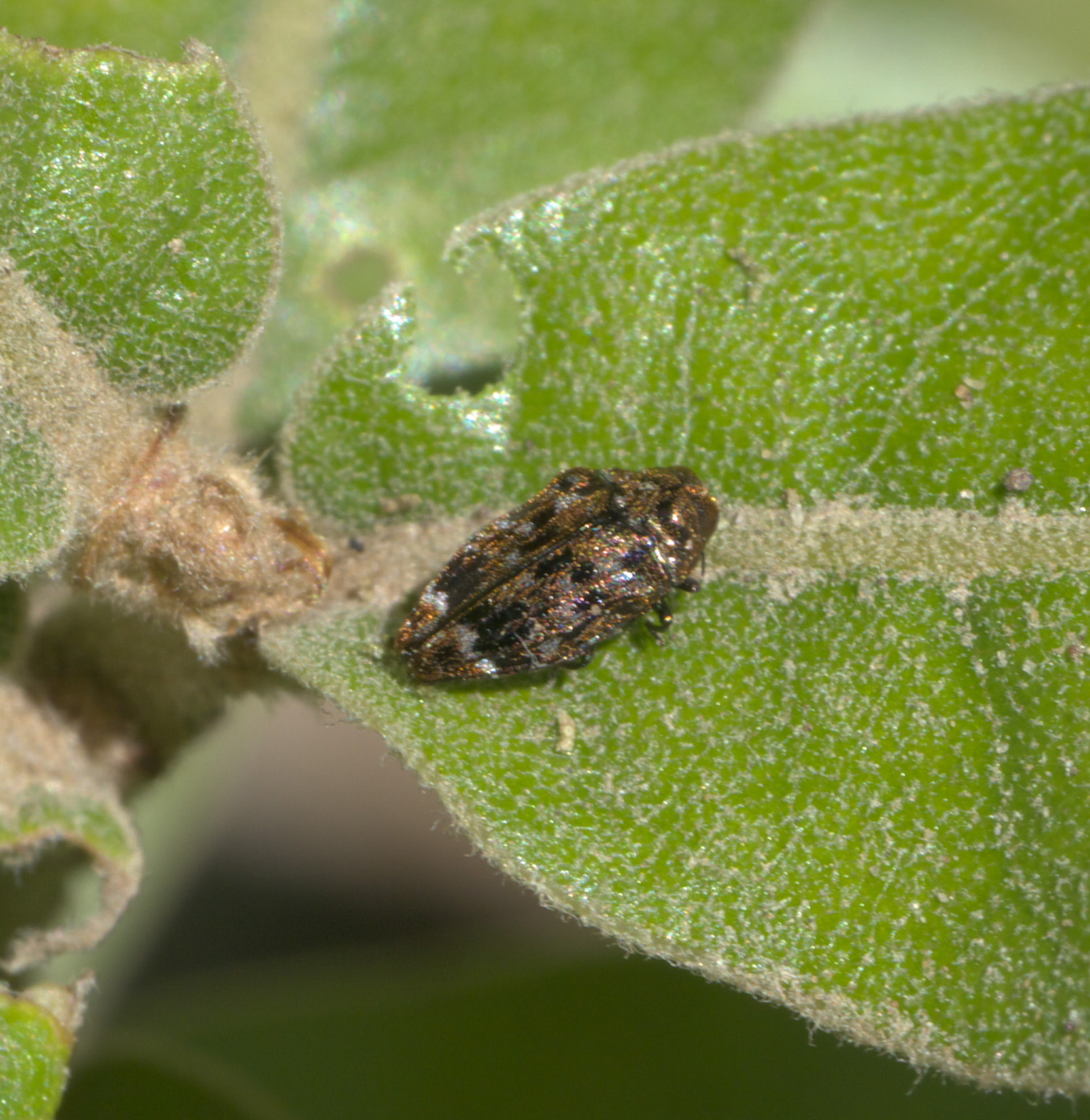

== Subspecies ==
These two subspecies belong to the species Brachys ovatus:

- Brachys ovatus bellporti Nicolay & Weiss
- Brachys ovatus ovatus
