= Brachys floricola =

Scientific classification
- Domain: Eukaryota
- Kingdom: Animalia
- Phylum: Arthropoda
- Class: Insecta
- Order: Coleoptera
- Suborder: Polyphaga
- Infraorder: Elateriformia
- Family: Buprestidae
- Genus: Brachys
- Species: B. floricola

Binomial name
- Brachys floricola Kerremans, 1900

Synonyms
- Brachys blatchleyi Nicolay and Weiss, 1923; Brachys cuprescens Blatchley, 1913

Species of beetle

Brachys floricola is a species of metallic wood-boring beetle in the family Buprestidae. It is native to North America, and chiefly to the continental United States.
