= Brachys aerosus =

Scientific classification
- Domain: Eukaryota
- Kingdom: Animalia
- Phylum: Arthropoda
- Class: Insecta
- Order: Coleoptera
- Suborder: Polyphaga
- Infraorder: Elateriformia
- Family: Buprestidae
- Genus: Brachys
- Species: B. aerosus

Binomial name
- Brachys aerosus (Melsheimer, 1845)

Synonyms
- Brachys rufescens Nicolay and Weiss, 1923

Species of beetle

Brachys aerosus is a species of metallic wood-boring beetle in the family Buprestidae. It is found in North America.

== Subspecies ==
These two subspecies belong to the species Brachys aerosus:

- Brachys aerosus aerosus
- Brachys aerosus rufescens Nicolay & Weiss
