= Brachys querci =

Scientific classification
- Domain: Eukaryota
- Kingdom: Animalia
- Phylum: Arthropoda
- Class: Insecta
- Order: Coleoptera
- Suborder: Polyphaga
- Infraorder: Elateriformia
- Family: Buprestidae
- Genus: Brachys
- Species: B. querci

Binomial name
- Brachys querci Knull, 1952

Species of beetle

Brachys querci is a species of metallic wood-boring beetle in the family Buprestidae. It is found in North America.
