= Brachys monnei =

Scientific classification
- Kingdom: Animalia
- Phylum: Arthropoda
- Clade: Pancrustacea
- Class: Insecta
- Order: Coleoptera
- Suborder: Polyphaga
- Infraorder: Elateriformia
- Family: Buprestidae
- Genus: Brachys
- Species: B. monnei

Binomial name
- Brachys monnei Migliore, 2026

Species of beetle

Brachys monnei is a species of beetle of the family Buprestidae. It is found in Brazil (Amazonas, São Paulo).

== Description ==
Adults reach a length of about 3.5 mm (0.14 in). The head is light brown with golden reflections and covered with sparse and evenly distributed white pubescence. The antennae are light brown with golden reflections. The pronotum and elytra are also light brown with golden reflections, and sparsely and uniformly covered with whitish setae. The legs are black.

== Etymology ==
The species is named in honour of Dr. Miguel Monné.
