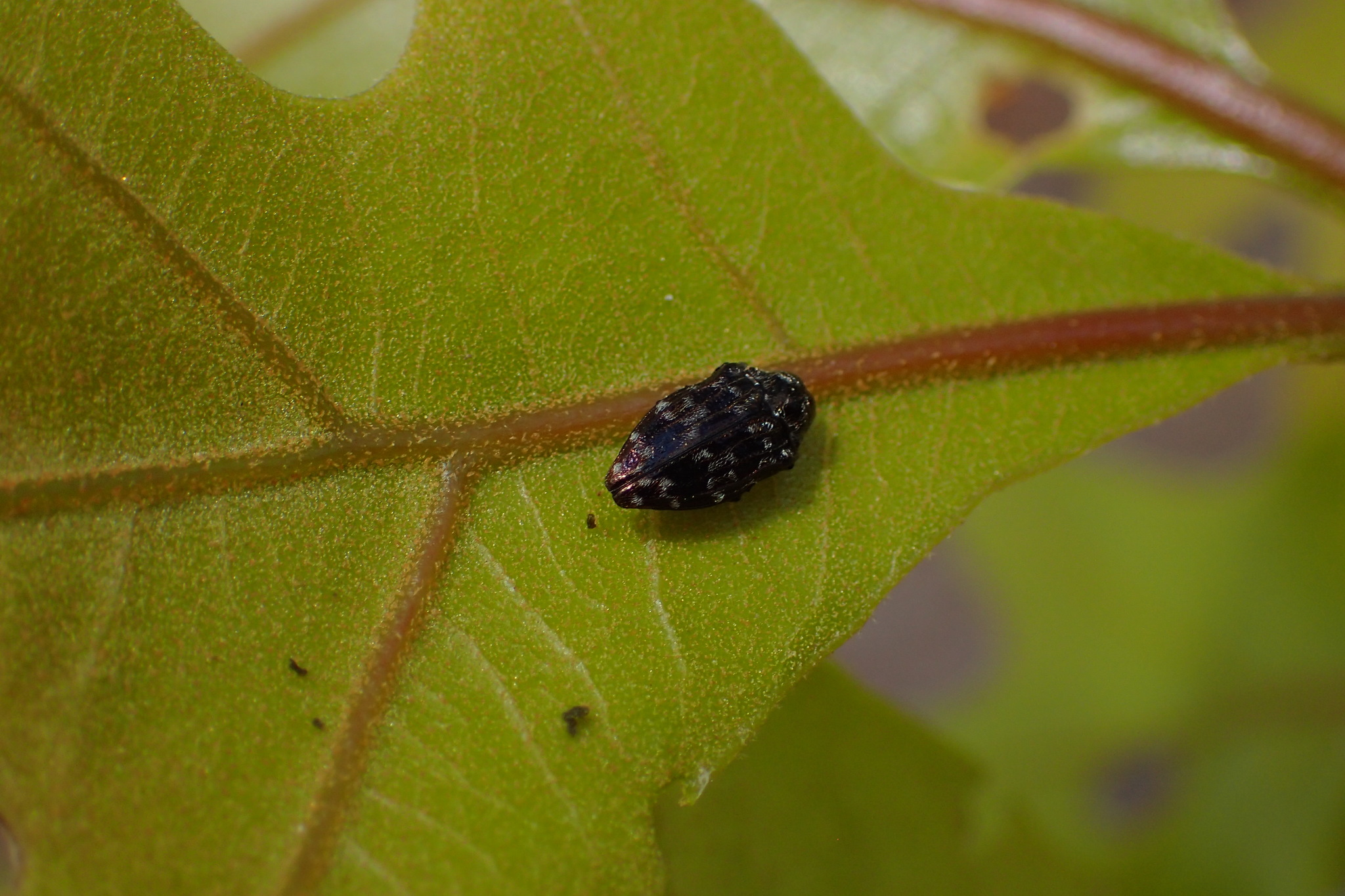

Scientific classification
- Kingdom: Animalia
- Phylum: Arthropoda
- Clade: Pancrustacea
- Class: Insecta
- Order: Coleoptera
- Suborder: Polyphaga
- Infraorder: Elateriformia
- Family: Buprestidae
- Genus: Brachys
- Species: B. tessellatus

Binomial name
- Brachys tessellatus Fabricius, 1801

= Brachys tesselatus =

Brachys tesselatus Temporal range: Miocene–Present

Species of beetle

Brachys tesselatus is a species of a leaf-mining beetle, primarily distributed along the southeast coast of the United States. Its distribution corresponds with the turkey oak, its main host plant. Although B. tesselatus primarily feeds and mines on turkey oak leaves, its impact on the host species is limited, allowing for the survival of both species.

The maturation of B. tesselatus spans approximately a year, starting from egg to adult emergence. Adults feed on buds in early March and ovipositing from mid-April to June. Oviposition preferences are hierarchical among oak species, influenced by factors like host abundance and light conditions.

The sex ratio of adults skews towards females, possibly due to male-killing bacteria, particularly the Btess Rickettsia bacterium. Parthenogenetic reproduction occurs at low levels, possibly due to male scarcity from male-killing bacteria. Btess Rickettsia is identified as the causal agent of sex ratio distortion, with antibiotic treatment increasing male survival rates.

Natural enemies, including parasitoids and predators, significantly regulate B. tesselatus populations. Less than 40% of larvae survive into the fall, primarily due to parasitoids and predators. Cannibalism, host-plant interactions, and other mortality factors also impact B. tesselatus populations. B. tesselatus demonstrates a complex life cycle and reproductive behavior shaped by interactions with its environment and natural enemies.

== Distribution and habitat ==
B. tesselatus is confined to the southeast coast of the United States, occurring north to New Jersey, south to Florida, and west to Texas. It is also found in Indiana, Louisiana, and Mississippi. This distribution largely coincides with the turkey oak, which occupies the dry, deep, sandy soils of the region. B. tesselatus feeding and mining activities are found to be restricted to the leaves of turkey oak. Adult beetles may occur on leaves of other oak species in the area, but they do not feed and mine on these leaves.

B. tesselatus exhibits selective preferences for microhabitats within its range. Factors such as light conditions, temperature gradients, and moisture levels influence the distribution and abundance of B. tesselatus populations. In particular, individuals show a preference for thermally favored microclimates, which may influence their activity patterns, feeding behavior, and reproductive activities.

== Life cycle ==
Mating occurs in early April, with females often continuing to feed while mating. Oviposition begins in mid-April and continues through June. Eggs are laid singly on the upper leaf surface, near veins or leaf margins, covered with a waxy secretion. Females use their abdominal sternite to place and smooth eggs. Eggs darken with age and hatch within two weeks. There's no significant difference in hatch success between eggs laid in exposed versus shaded positions. Beetle activities are not random regarding crown strata; they prefer thermally favored microclimates. Early-season feeding and oviposition primarily occur in the upper crown, shifting to more shaded areas as the season progresses.

From the egg stage to emerging from pupation as an adult takes about one year. Adult beetles emerge in early March, coinciding with or just before bud break in host trees. They start feeding on buds at the top of tree crowns and move downward as leaves expand, beginning at leaf margins and progressing inward, consuming all leaf layers.

Eggs are distributed contagiously on leaves, indicating a non-random pattern. Most oviposition events are single, with leaf and mine dimensions limiting successful development to one individual per leaf. Eggs hatch from late April into May.

Larvae have five instars, with the first instar starting in May. The fifth instar may last from late August until the winter when it will pupate. Larvae enter leaf parenchyma through the epidermis at the oviposition site, forming subepidermal mines. Mines widen through sweeps of the mine perimeter, gravitating basally toward the leaf petiole. Larvae undergo pupation and overwinter in leaf mines. Pupation occurs within leaf mines, with cold temperatures delaying onset but not necessary for development. Pupae can survive long exposures to cold, with successful adult emergence.

== Sex ratio distortion ==
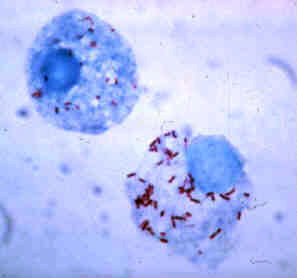
The bacteria, Rickettsia, that may be responsible for the sex ratio distortion

The sex ratio of adults is skewed towards females, observed consistently across collections and dates. This skewing is evident even in larvae reared from late-season mines, and this may be due to Btess Rickettsia, a tick-associated bacteria. Inherited microorganisms can cause various reproductive alterations in their hosts, including male-killing. Inherited microorganisms are typically passed from mother to offspring through the egg cytoplasm, resulting in high maternal (female) inheritance. The asymmetrical inheritance pattern of inherited microorganisms is generally adaptive for them because it ensures their transmission to future generations through the female line. Selection therefore favors microorganisms that bias the sex ratio towards females, as females are the transmitting sex.

A 2001 study identified a new Rickettsia associated with male-killing in B. tesselatus, Btess Rickettsia, as the causal agent of sex ratio distortion. Antibiotic treatment increased embryonic hatching rates and the proportion of surviving males, which aligns with the expectations that the bacterium selectively killed male embryos before hatching. Transmission of Rickettsia to other members of the same species through non-hereditary means may occur through competition for food, particularly in high-density populations where larvae compete for resources. The degree of sex ratio distortion varies across populations, suggesting variation in response to bacterial infection or transmission rates.

== Inter-species interactions ==
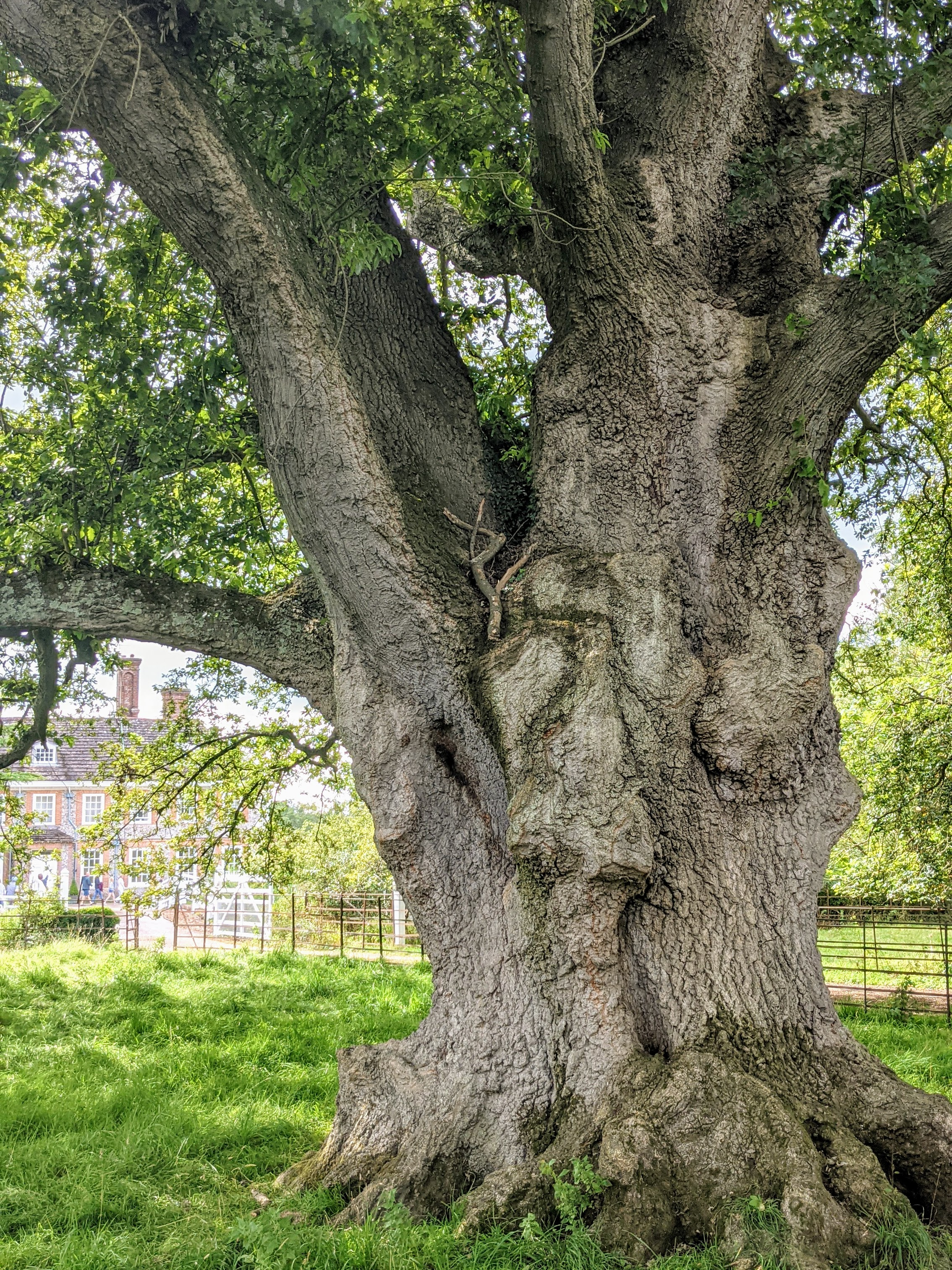
Turkey Oat

Leaves of turkey oak hosting living B. tesselatus larvae were observed to detach from trees earlier than those without larvae. This expedited leaf shedding, influenced by B. tesselatus activity, is likely attributed to alterations in leaf hormone levels triggered by larval feeding, a phenomenon observed in similar ecological systems. Increased leaf shedding of the turkey oak has fitness consequences for B. tesselatus larvae, such as growth and survivorship.

A 2001 study reported that B. tesselatus larvae show developmental plasticity, allowing them to complete larval development successfully over a range of season lengths despite variations in leaf abscission phenology. The findings suggested that B. tesselatus has adapted to variations in leaf abscission phenology by evolving the ability to complete development over different season lengths within a localized area. The study also found that early leaf abscission had little effect on non-predator-mediated mortality.

The diversity of B. tesselatus beetles has been studied with increasing intensity over the years as a result of their relationship with blood-feeding bacteria known as Rickettsia. The bacteria is involved in reproductive manipulation and has been associated with male embryo mortality in B. tesselatus beetles. Researchers are continuing to understand this relationship but the parasitism of the bacterial lineage has been well documented in recent years. The exact mechanisms of vertebrate pathogenicity by way of Rickettsia towards B. tesselatus beetles are still unknown.

== Reproductive behavior ==
With regards to the bionomics of B. tesselatus beetles, researchers have recently discovered that adult feeding in March and April naturally preceded oviposition from April into June.

For insects like B. tesselatus, whose offspring complete development at the site of oviposition, maternal oviposition preference plays a crucial role in determining offspring success. Preferences for oviposition sites are expected to evolve hierarchically based on the performance of larvae on different host plants. The choice is usually between different species of oak (Quercus marylandica, Q. laevis, Q. incana, Q. nigra, and Q. margaretta). Environmental factors such as host abundance and light conditions (sun versus shade effects) might influence oviposition site preferences observed in the wild. Host plant abundance and microhabitat conditions could also play a significant role in shaping oviposition preferences in natural settings.

Parthenogenetic reproduction, or asexual reproduction without fertilization, occurs at low levels (up to 10%), possibly as a selective consequence of the scarcity of males in the population due to high frequencies of male-killing bacteria in B. tesselatus. The system provides opportunities to explore evolutionary dynamics of genetic conflict over sex determination and alternative reproductive strategies.

== Mortality ==
=== Natural enemies ===
There are fourteen natural enemies of B. tesselatus, including:

- Two Eulophid Egg Parasitoids: Parasitic wasps that lay their eggs inside the eggs of B. tesselatus.
- Nine Eulophid Larval Parasitoids: Parasitic wasps that parasitize the larvae of B. tesselatus.
- Two Chalcidid Pupal Parasitoids: Parasitic wasps that parasitize the pupae of B. tesselatus.
- One Clerid Larval Predator: A beetle predator that preys on the larvae of B. tesselatus.
- Three Facultative Hyperparasitoids: These are parasitoids that parasitize other parasitoids, potentially including some of the previously mentioned eulophid parasitoids.
- Unidentified Egg and Larval Predators: These predators remove eggs and larvae from egg coats and larval mines, contributing to the natural control of B. tesselatus populations.

Additionally, there is a hyperparasite associated with the larval stage, which might function in a primary role, although it is not clearly identified.

Parasitoids and predators play a crucial role in regulating the population of B. tesselatus, as they are a primary contributor to larval and pupal mortality. Less than 40% of B. tesselatus larvae survive into the fall, and even less survive until emergence into adults.

=== Other causes ===
Cannibalism may occur when multiple larvae attempt development within a single leaf. However, such encounters are rare, and successful development of multiple larvae in a single leaf is generally unlikely due to limited space.

The effects of B. tesselatus feeding and mining activities on Q. laevis (turkey oak) are limited. Leaf function in unmined areas was minimally impaired, with most reduction in photosynthetic surface occurring during the penultimate and ultimate larval stages when seasonal growth in the host was largely completed.

The tolerance of turkey oak and minimal interference from B. tesselatus appear to reduce the impact of the host-parasite interaction, thereby enhancing the survival of both species.

Intrageneration developmental mortality is high (>99.1%), but survivorship is comparable to other natural insect populations studied. Fecundity likely compensates for these losses, with potential immigration balancing losses locally. However, the intergeneration impacts of various mortality agents can not be determined with available data.
