= Chondroceras =

Chondroceras Temporal range: Bajocian

Scientific classification
- Kingdom: Animalia
- Phylum: Mollusca
- Class: Cephalopoda
- Subclass: †Ammonoidea
- Genus: †Chondroceras

Chondroceras is an extinct genus from a well-known class of fossil cephalopods, the ammonites. It lived during the Jurassic Period,.
