= Hammatoceratoidea =

Superfamily of molluscs (fossil)

Hammatoceratoidea, formerly Hammatocerataceae, was a superfamily of middle Jurassic ammonites erected by Schindewolf in 1964 that combined the families Graphoceratidae, Hammatoceratidae, and Sonniniidae. The three families were previously included in the Hildoceratoidea, however subsequent classifications have moved the families back into Hildoceratoidea.

Shells of hammatoceratoids are variably evolute or involute, ribbed at least in the early growth stage; cross section typically compressed (higher than wide); venter commonly with a median keel.

Hammatoceratoids were suggested to be derived from the family Phymatoceratidae of the Hildoceratoidea, beginning with the Hammatoceratidae near the end of the Early Jurassic.
