= Euhoploceras =

Euhoploceras Temporal range: Aalenian–Bajocian

Scientific classification
- Kingdom: Animalia
- Phylum: Mollusca
- Class: Cephalopoda
- Subclass: †Ammonoidea
- Genus: †Euhoploceras

Euhoploceras is an extinct genus from a well-known class of fossil cephalopods, the ammonites. It lived during the Jurassic Period, which lasted from approximately 200 to 145 million years ago.
