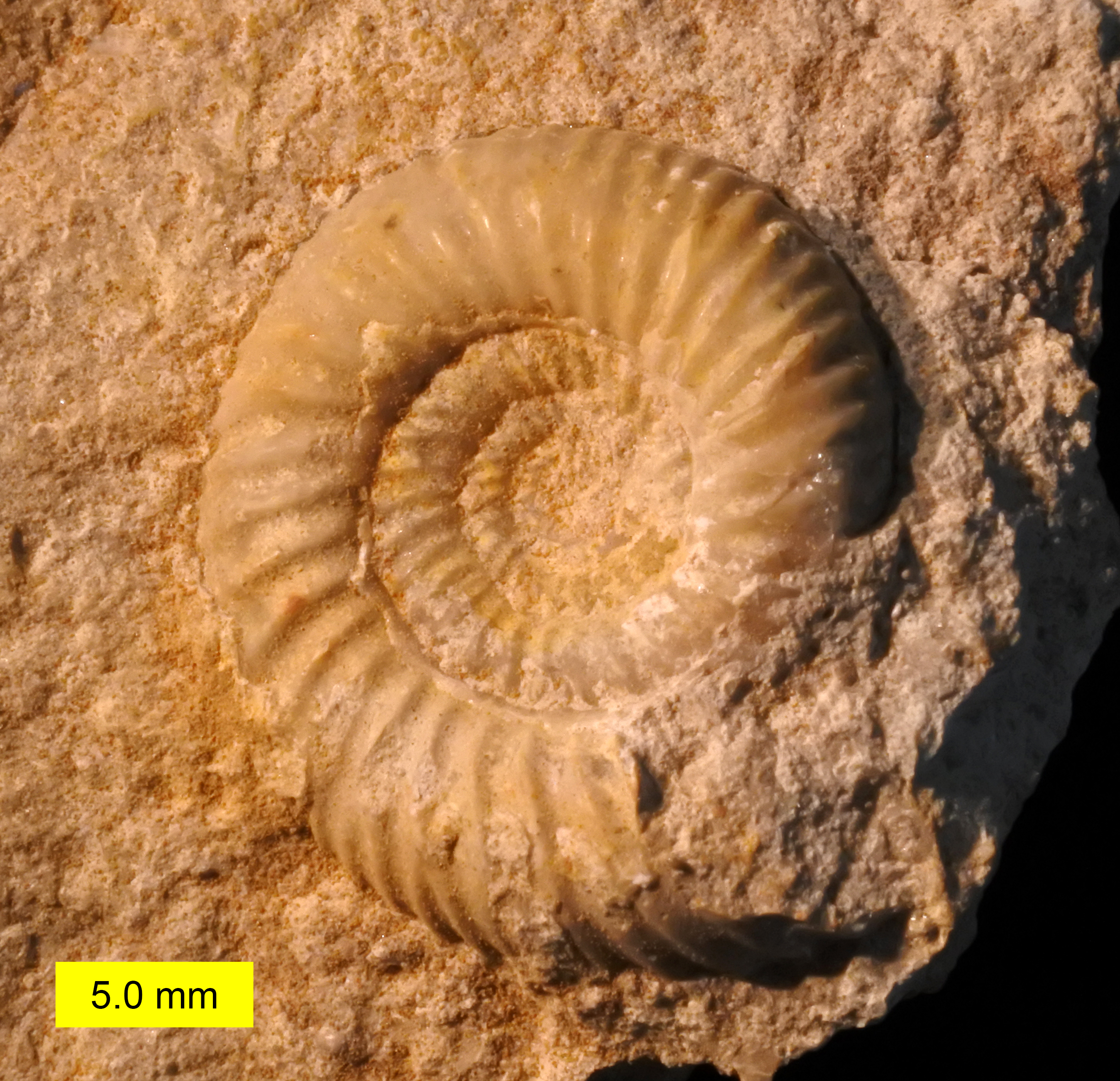
- Leptosphinctes sp., microconch, Dorset, England, Middle Jurassic.

Scientific classification
- Kingdom: Animalia
- Phylum: Mollusca
- Class: Cephalopoda
- Subclass: †Ammonoidea
- Genus: †Leptosphinctes

Subgenera
- Leptosphinctes (Cleistosphinctes); Leptosphinctes (Kubanoceras); Leptosphinctes (Leptosphinctes)

= Leptosphinctes =

Leptosphinctes Temporal range: Bathonian

Genus of molluscs (fossil)

Leptosphinctes is an extinct genus from a well-known class of fossil cephalopods, the ammonites. It lived during the Jurassic Period, which lasted from approximately 200 to 145 million years ago.

== Distribution ==
Jurassic deposits of British Columbia, Egypt, Hungary, Iran, Mexico, Poland, Saudi Arabia and Spain.
