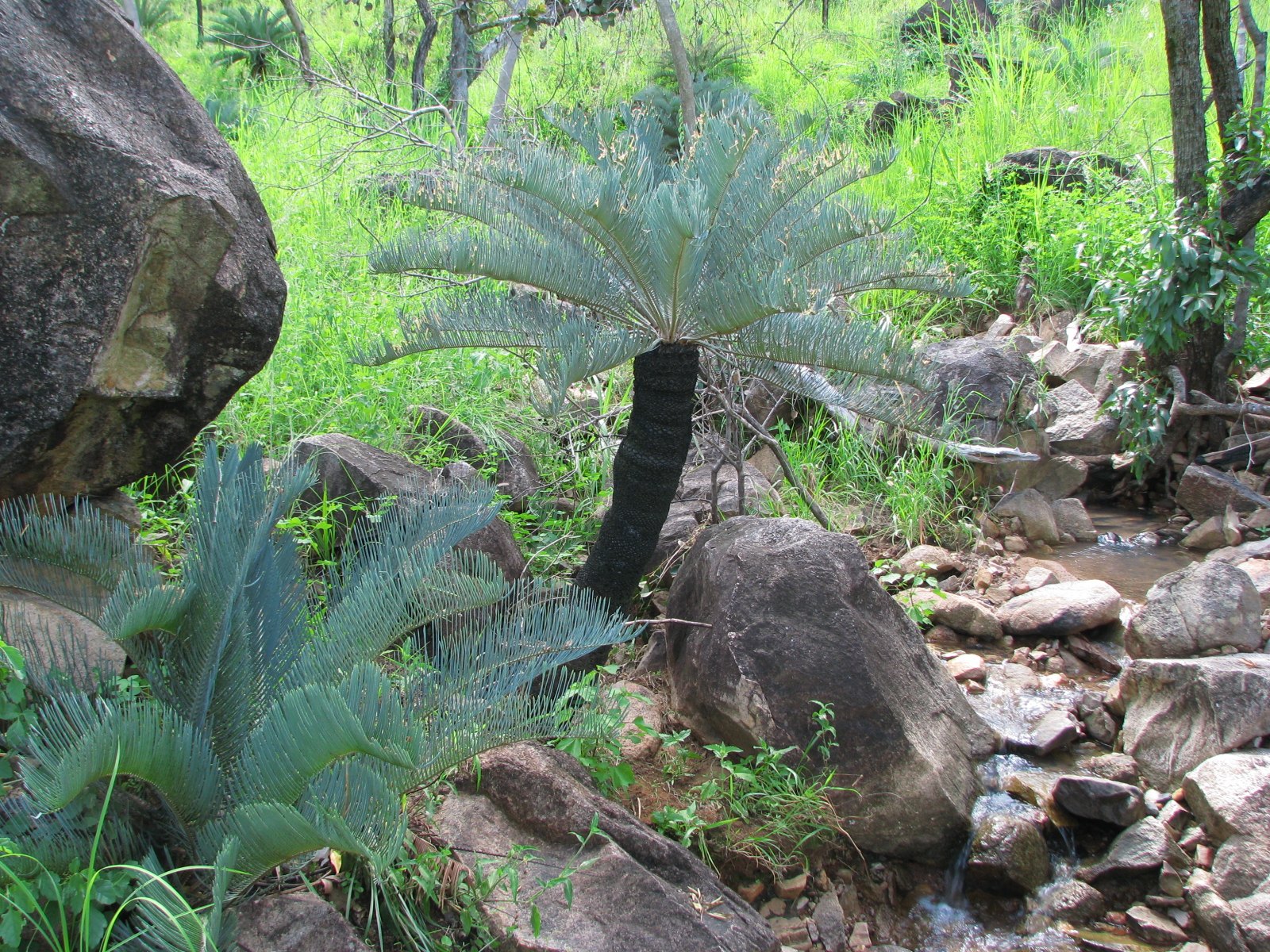

Conservation status
- Endangered (IUCN 3.1)

Scientific classification
- Kingdom: Plantae
- Clade: Tracheophytes
- Clade: Gymnospermae
- Division: Cycadophyta
- Class: Cycadopsida
- Order: Cycadales
- Family: Cycadaceae
- Genus: Cycas
- Species: C. platyphylla

Binomial name
- Cycas platyphylla K.D.Hill

= Cycas platyphylla =

Species of cycad

Cycas platyphylla is a cycad in the genus Cycas, native to Queensland, Australia.

The stems are erect or decumbent, growing to 1.5 m tall but most often less than a metre. The leaves are pinnate, keeled, 60–100 cm long. New fronds are glaucous blue at first, becoming dark yellow-green, moderately glossy above. Megasporophylls are thickly covered in orange indumentum and the developing seeds have an intensely glaucous sarcotesta.

== Habitat ==
This cycad has a main distribution in sparse Eucalyptus savanna on skeletal soils over outcrops of rhyolite or basalt west of the Atherton Tableland in north-east Queensland. This species is fire tolerant. It grows abundantly in cool habitat

== Gallery ==
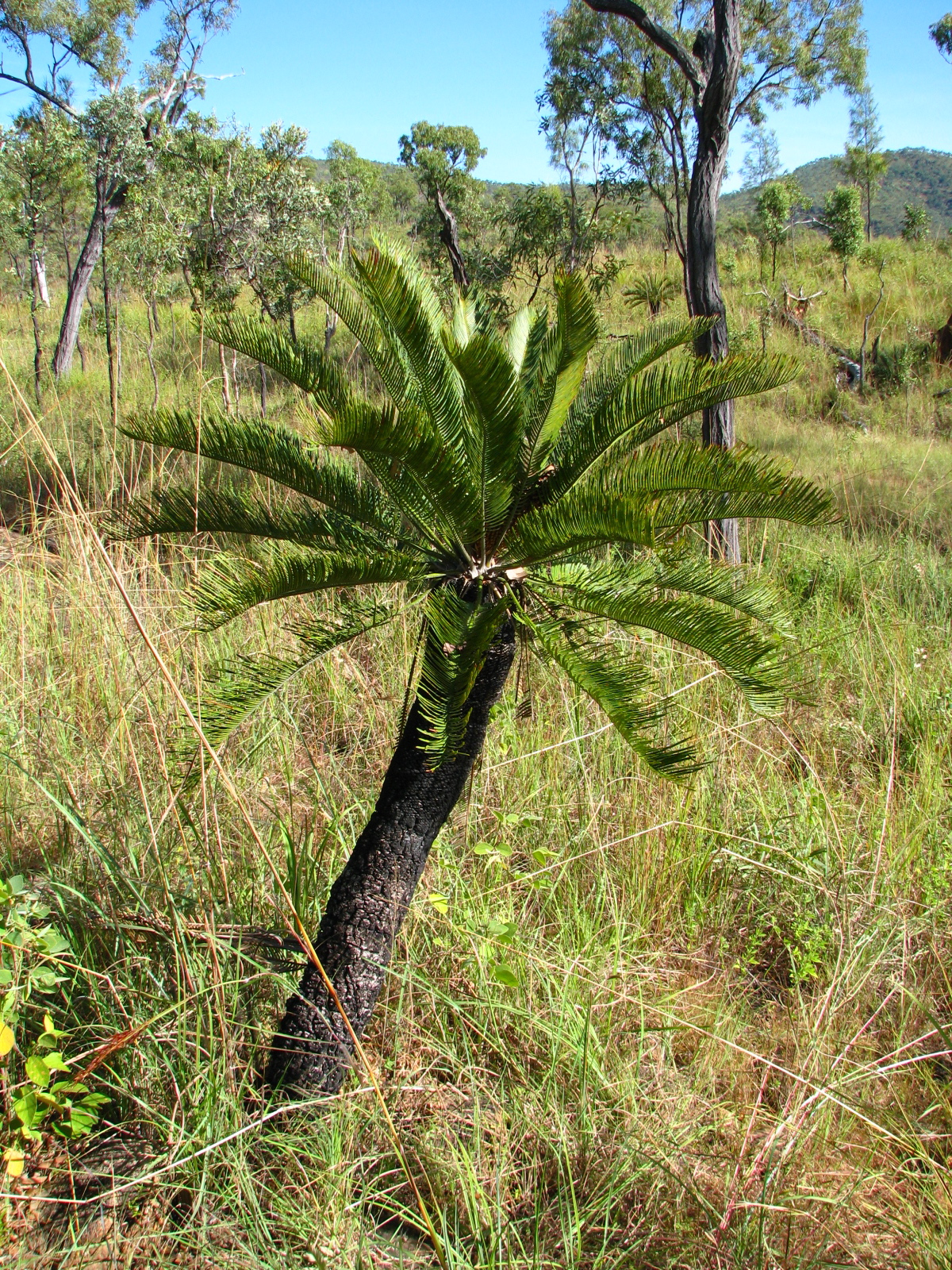
Wild plant in open savanna in north Queensland

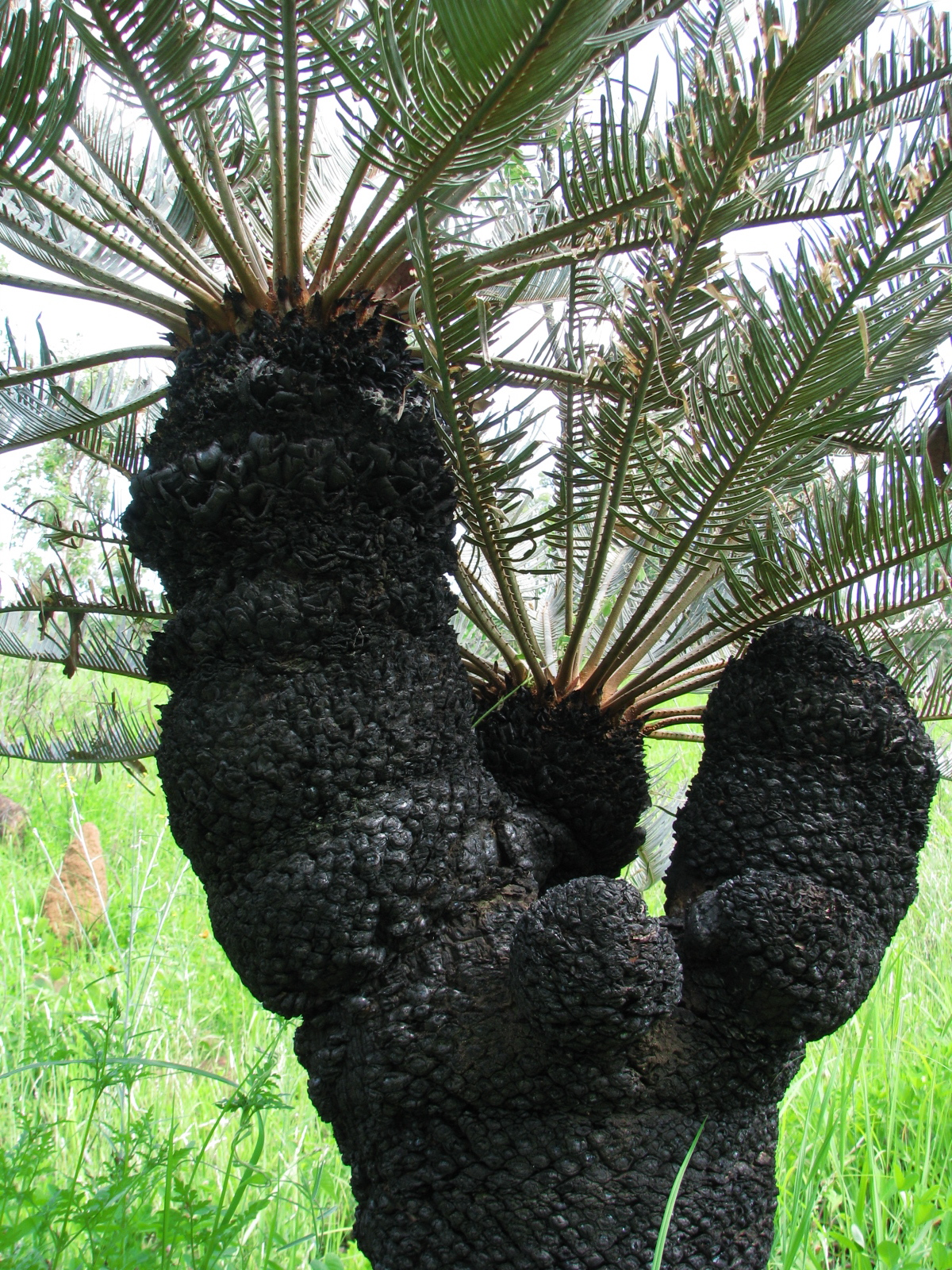
With fire-blackened, branched caudex

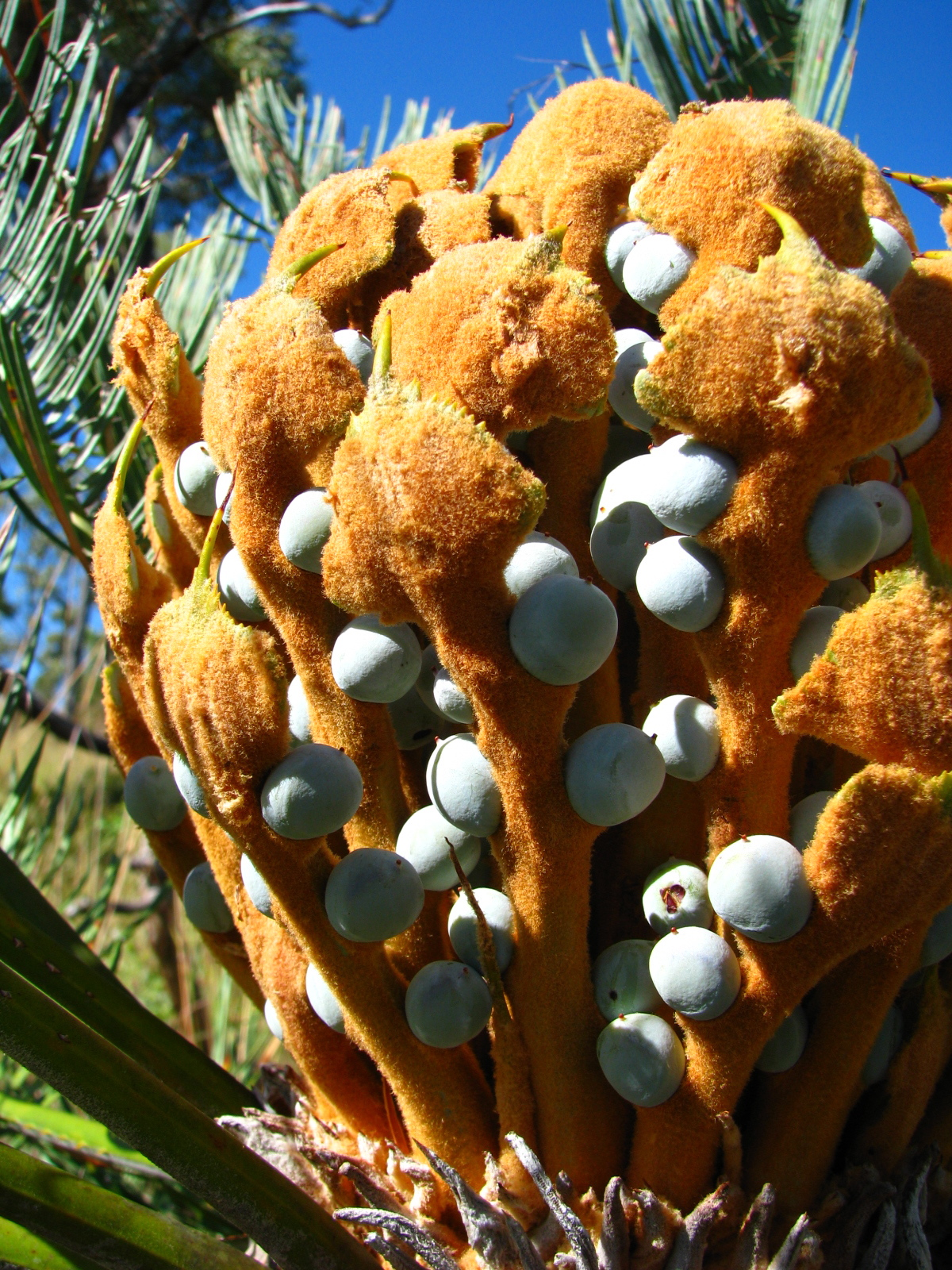
Megasporophylls on a wild plant

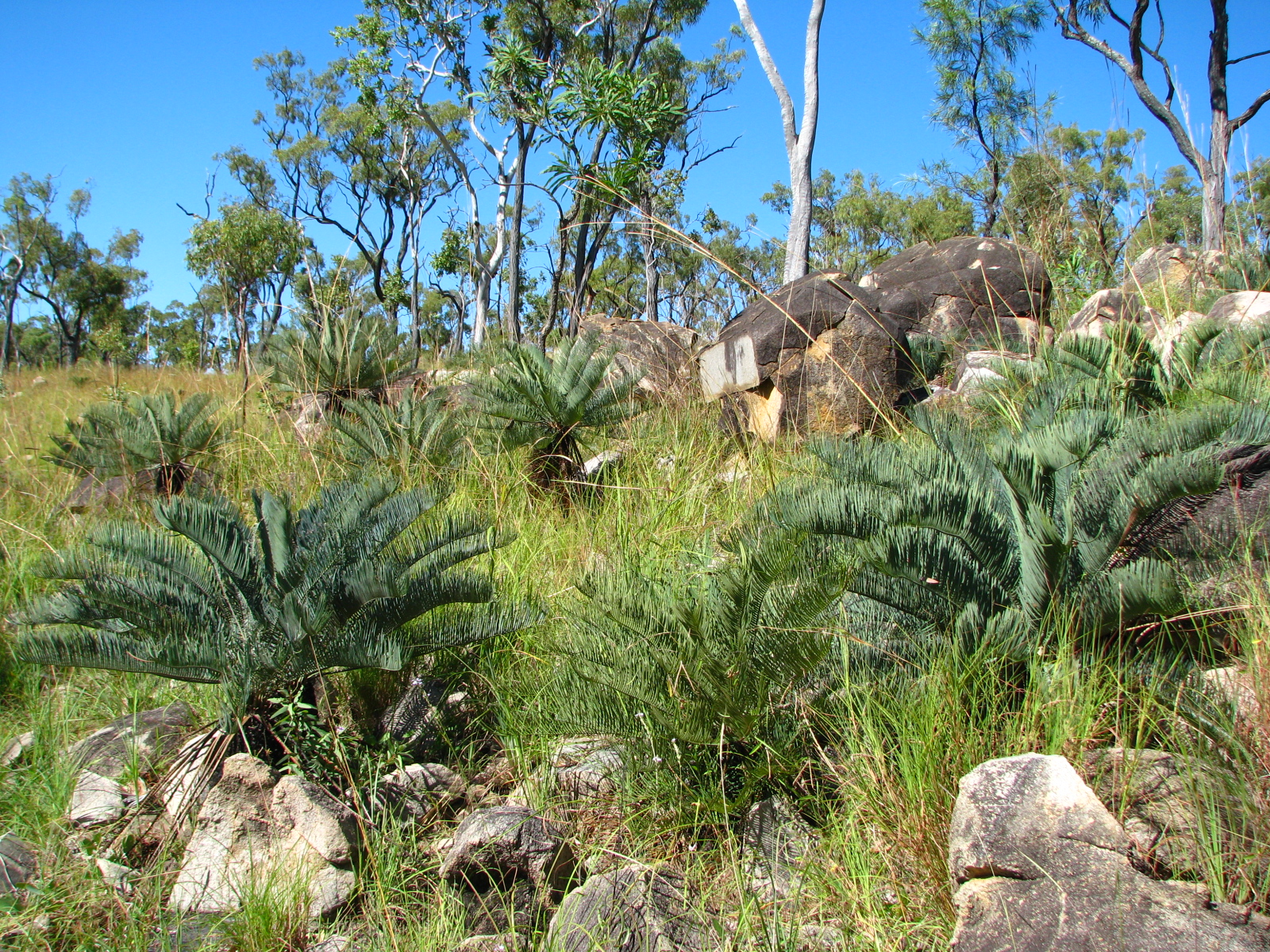
Colony on an outcrop of rhyolite in open dry-tropical savanna in northern Queensland
