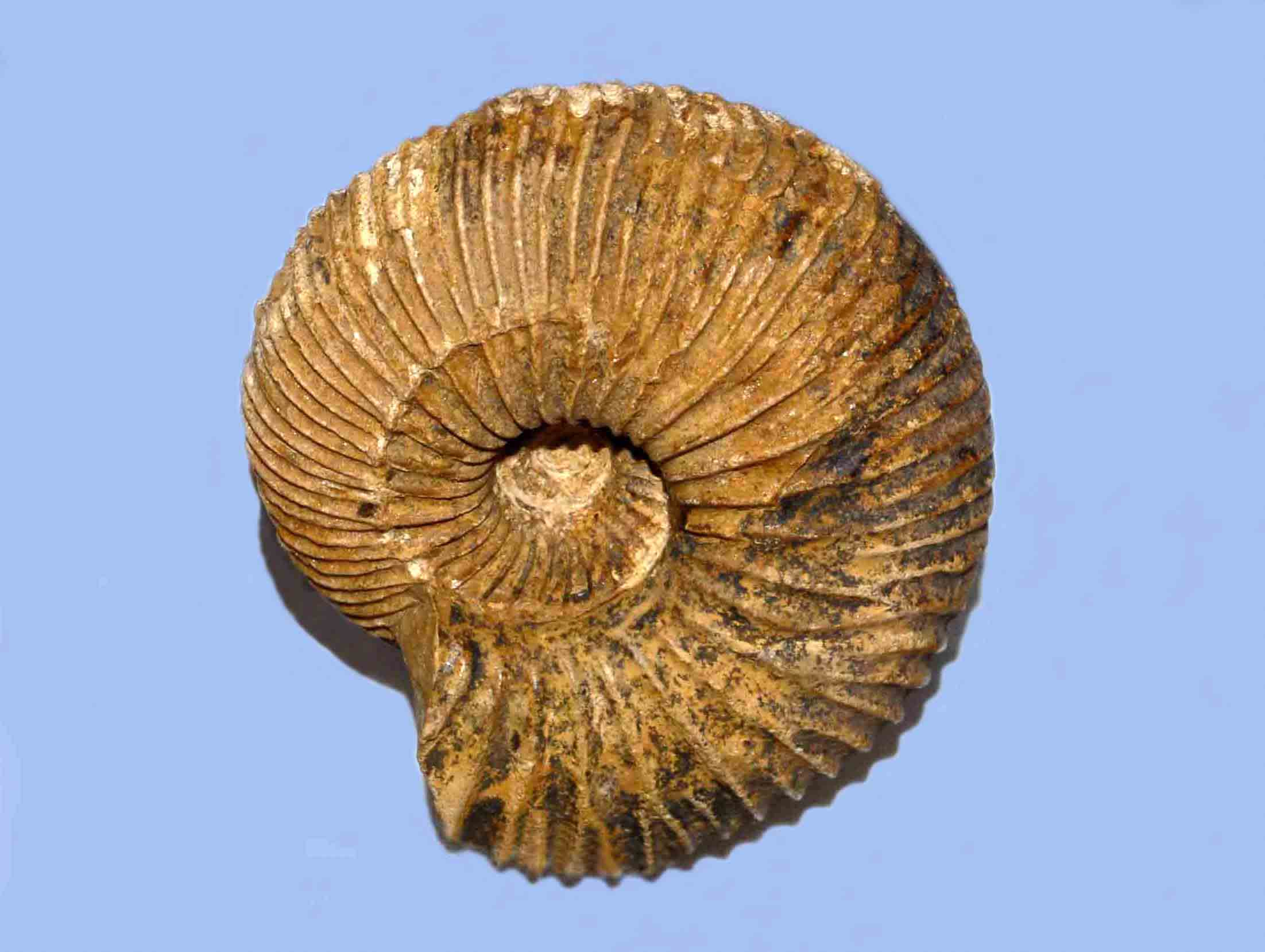
- Macrocephalites species

Scientific classification
- Kingdom: Animalia
- Phylum: Mollusca
- Class: Cephalopoda
- Subclass: †Ammonoidea
- Order: †Ammonitida
- Superfamily: †Stephanoceratoidea
- Family: †Macrocephalitidae; Buckmann, 1922

= Macrocephalitidae =

Macrocephalitidae Temporal range: Callovian

Extinct family of molluscs

Macrocephalitidae is an extinct family of marine invertebrate animals belonging to the superfamily Stephanoceratoidea, order Ammonitida.

== Etymology ==
The Macrocephalitidae is one of the 11 families listed in the Treatise, 1957 Part L in the superfamily Stephanoceratoidea.

According to Donovan et al. (1981) the superfamily Stephanoceratoidea should contain only five families and the Macrocephalitidae of the Treatise are reduced to subfamilies within the Sphaeroceratidae, Macrocephalitinae and Mayaitinae, but still in the Stephanoceratoidea.

== Genera ==
- Dolikephalites †
- Eucycloceras †
- Idiocycloceras †
- Indocephalites †
- Kamptokephalites †
- Macrocephalites †
- Nothocephalites †
- Peurocephalites †
- Subkossmatia †
