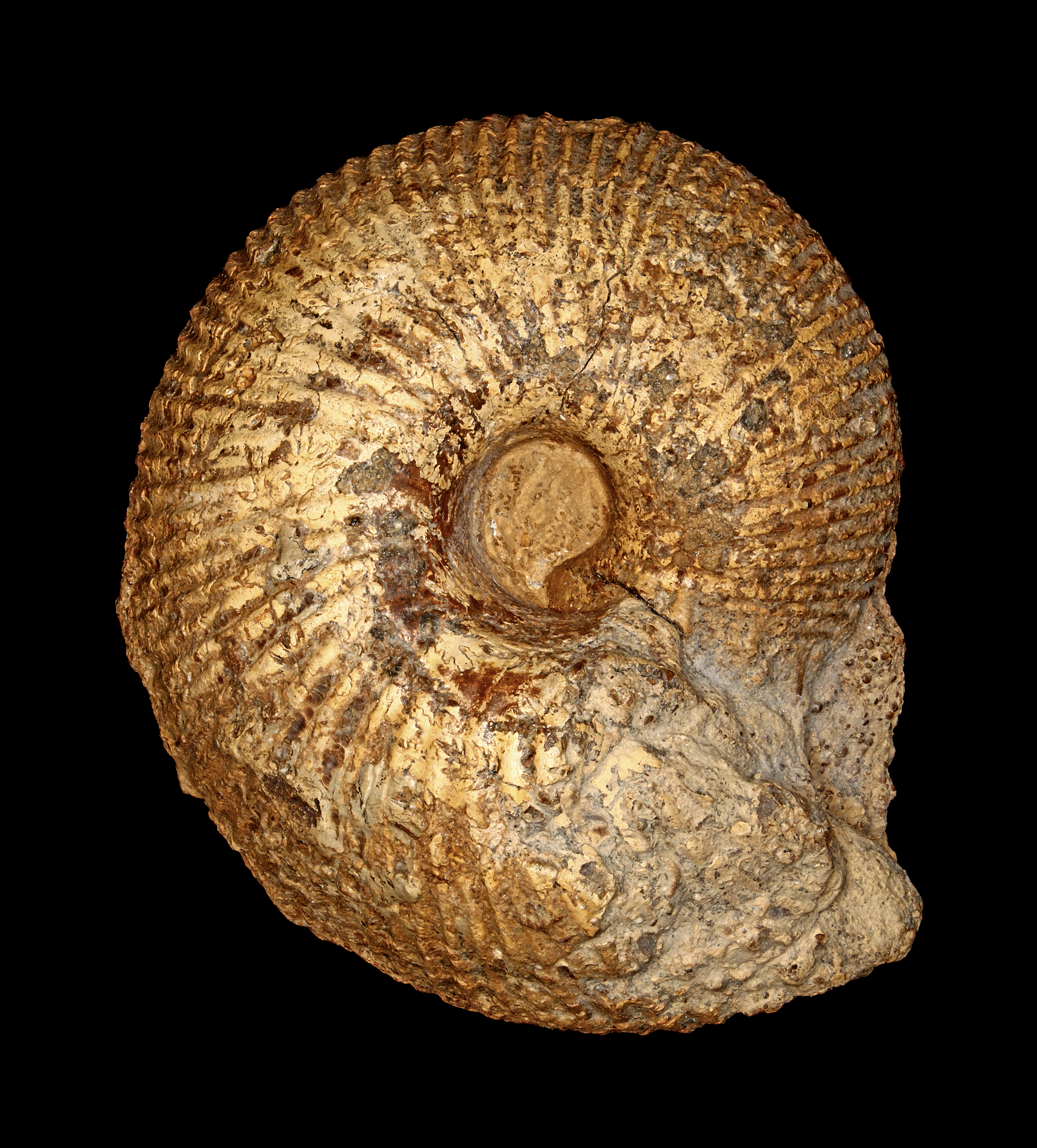

Scientific classification
- Kingdom: Animalia
- Phylum: Mollusca
- Class: Cephalopoda
- Subclass: †Ammonoidea
- Order: †Ammonitida
- Family: †Macrocephalitidae
- Genus: †Macrocephalites; Zittel, 1884

= Macrocephalites =

Macrocephalites Temporal range: Bathonian–Callovian

Genus of mollusc

Macrocephalites is a genus of the stephanoceratoid ammonite family Macrocephalitidae, diagnostic of the Callovian stage of the Middle Jurassic. Three subgenera, Dolikephalites, Kamptokephalites, and Pleurocephalites are recognized in addition to Macrocephalites itself, with Indocephalites tentatively included as the fourth.

== Diagnosis Macrocephalites s.s. ==
Macrocephalites itself has a strongly ribbed, involute, subglobose to discoidal shell with a somewhat small open umbilicus, compressed whorl section, higher than wide, and rounded venter. Early whorls are more strongly ribbed than later, which become smoother, ending with a smooth body chamber. Primary ribs, which emanate radially from the umbilicus, bifurcate and sometimes trifurcate mid flank and cross the venter uninterrupted. Shells grew to be large, even gigantic. Distribution is widespread.

== Subgenera ==
Dolikephalites is similar in general form to Macrocephalites but has fine ribbing that continues to the end and is never large.

Kamptokephalites is more globose than Macrocephalites' proper, with a depressed whorl section, wider than high, broadly arched venter, coarse plicate ribbing and wider umbilicus.

Pleurocephalites also has a broad shell with depressed whorl section and sharp ribbing that continues to the end. Primary ribs on the inner part of the whorls slope dorso-ventrally to the rear.

Indocephalites is broad and coarsely ribbed in early growth stages but becomes smoother and more compressed in the adult.

== Gallery ==
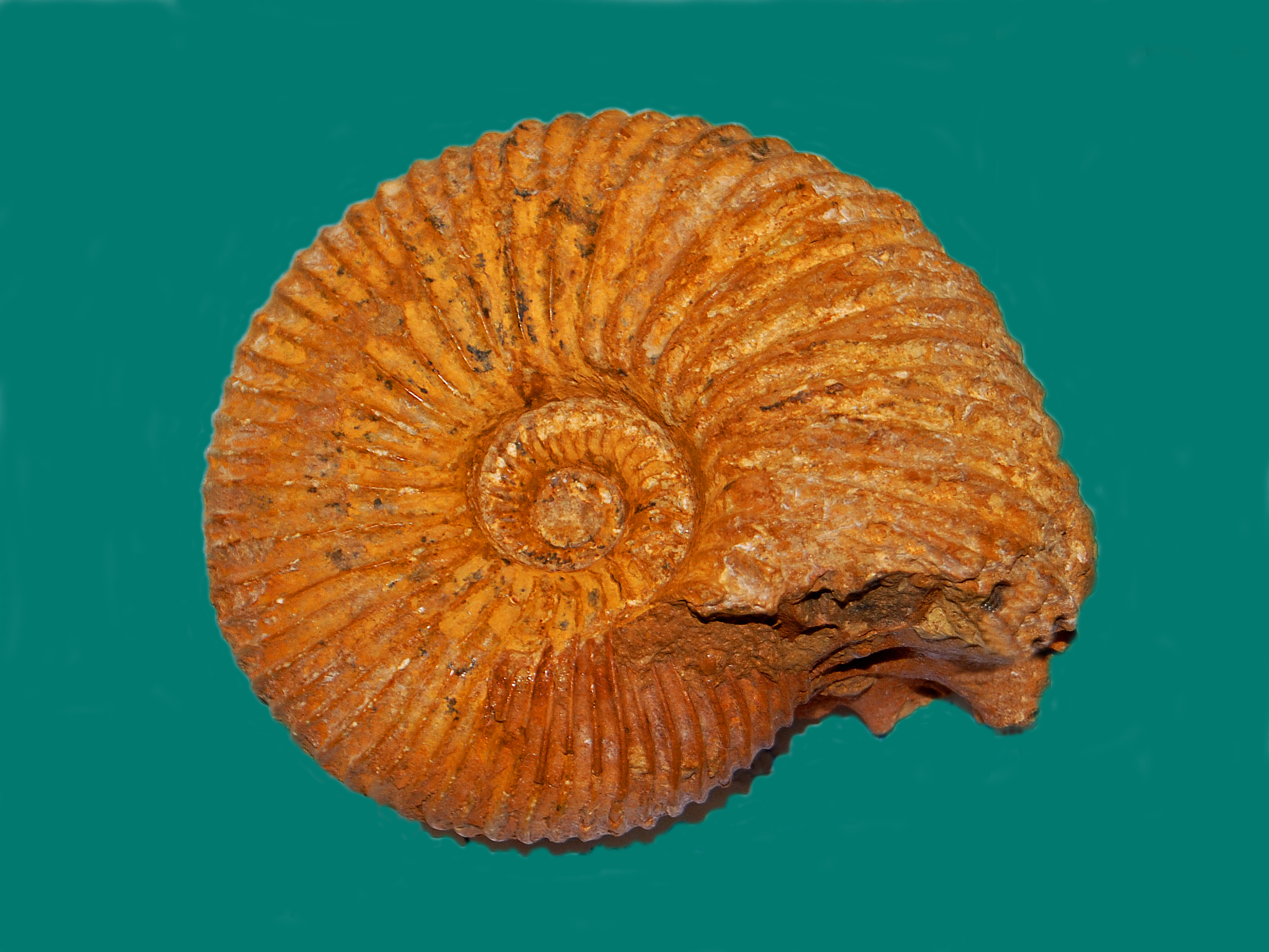
Macrocephalites (Dolikephalites) perseverans

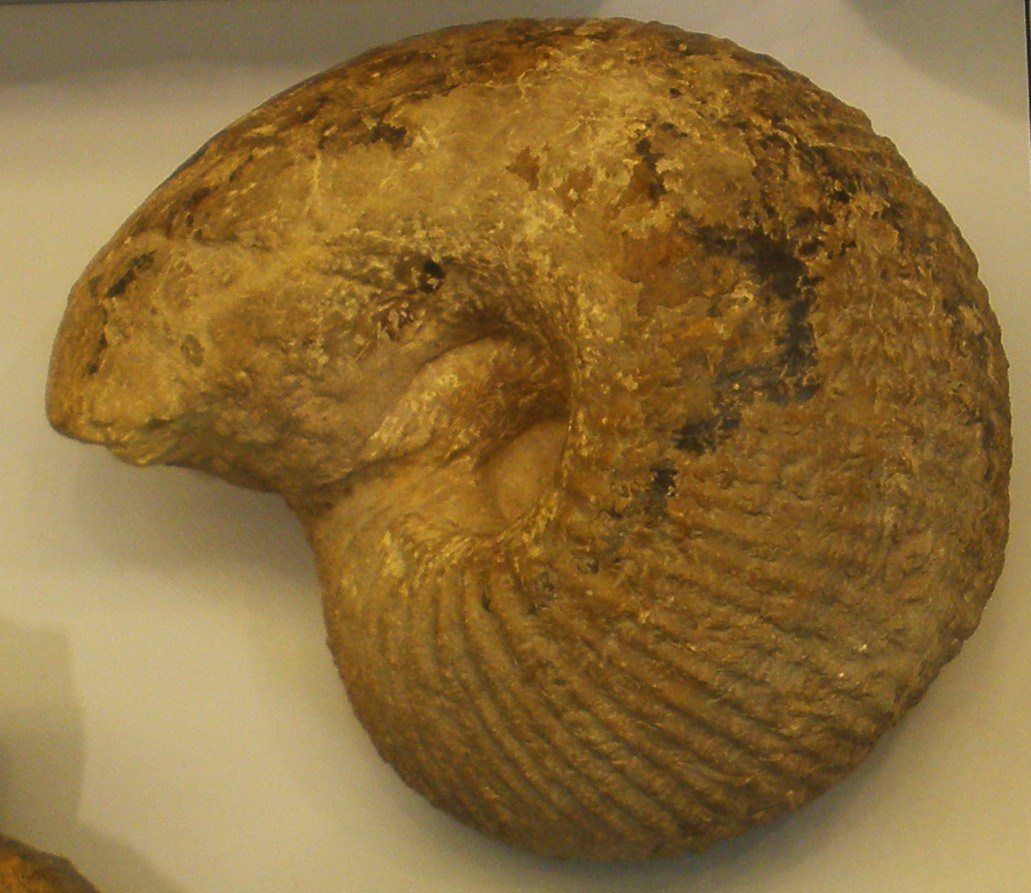
Subgenus Kamptokephalites

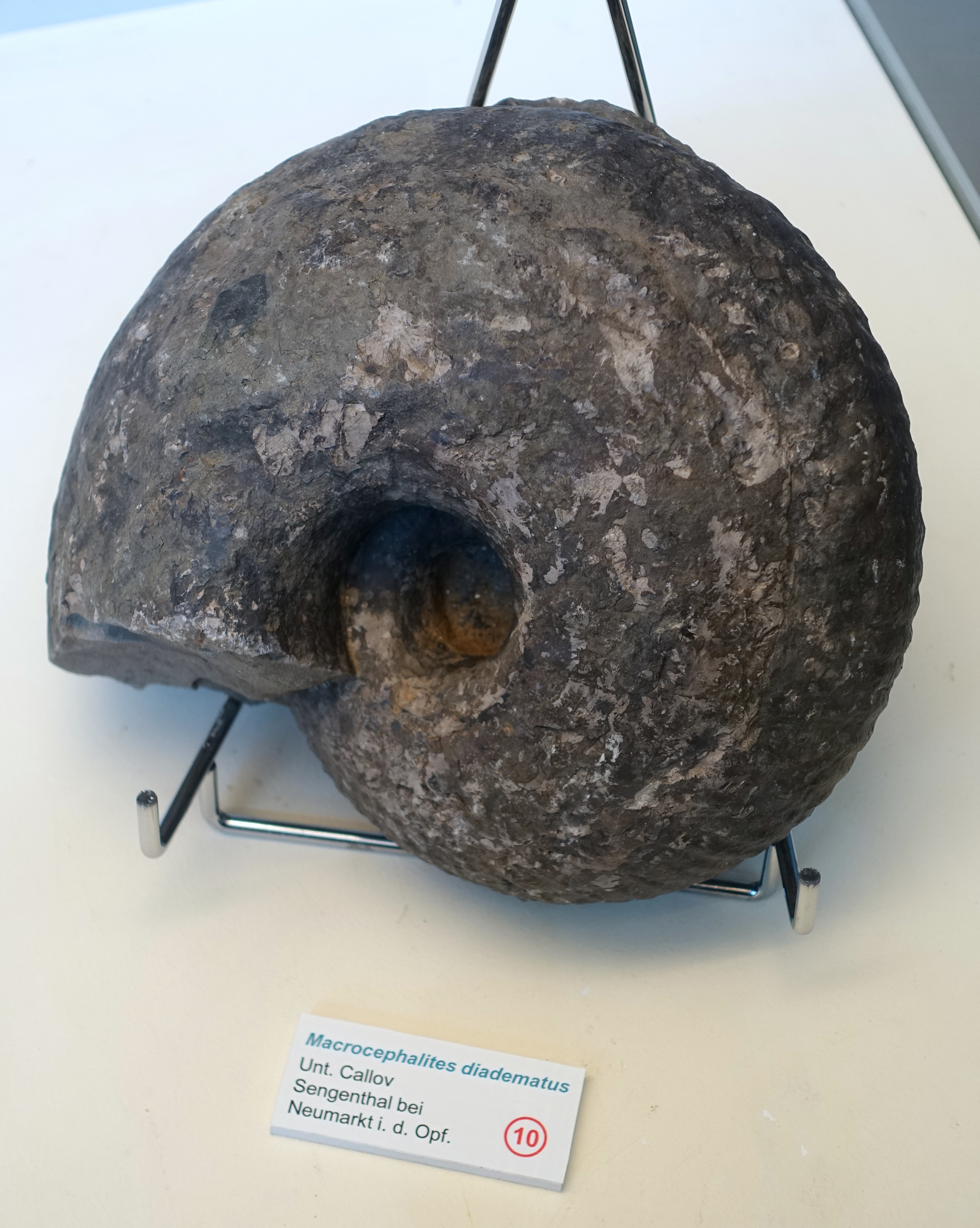
Macrocephalites diadematus
