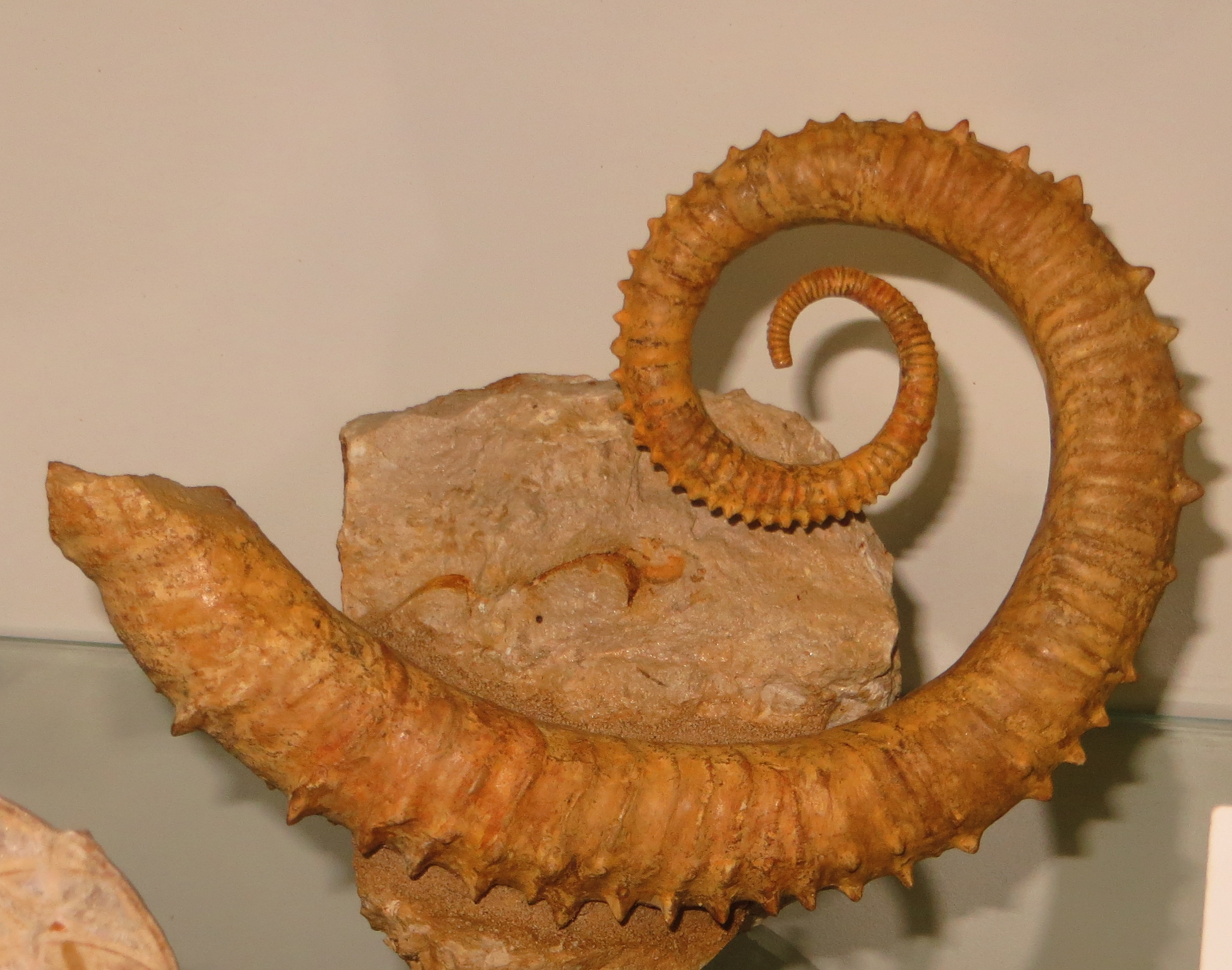

Scientific classification
- Kingdom: Animalia
- Phylum: Mollusca
- Class: Cephalopoda
- Subclass: †Ammonoidea
- Order: †Ammonitida
- Family: †Spiroceratidae
- Genus: †Spiroceras; Meek, 1876

= Spiroceras =

Extinct genus of ammonites

Spiroceras is a genus of extinct ammonites.
