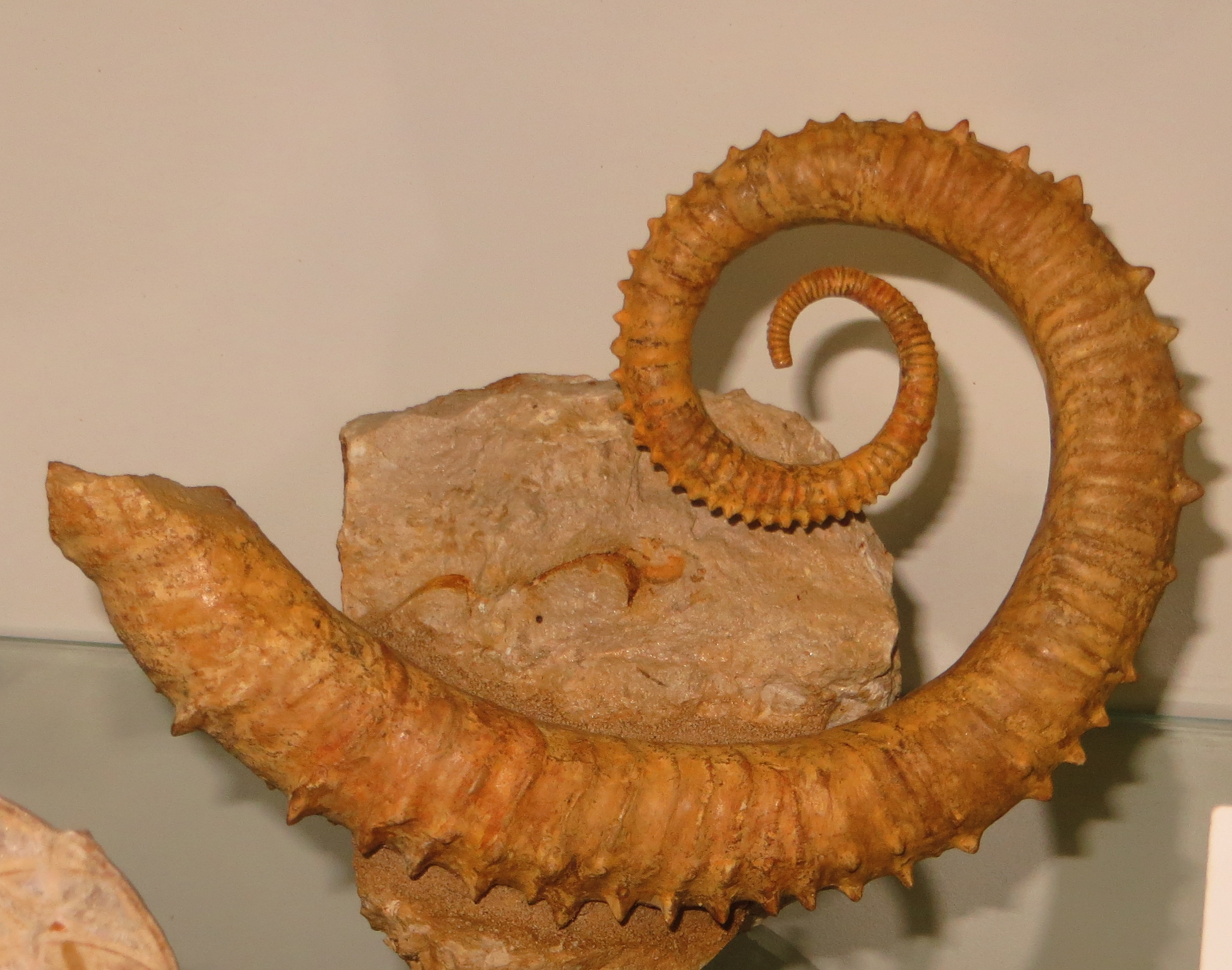
- Spiroceras sp.

Scientific classification
- Kingdom: Animalia
- Phylum: Mollusca
- Class: Cephalopoda
- Subclass: †Ammonoidea
- Order: †Ammonitida
- Superfamily: †Spiroceratoidea; Hyatt, 1900
- Family: †Spiroceratidae; Hyatt, 1900

Genera
- †Kumetaceras Galácz, 2019; †Sikeliceras Galácz, 2019; †Spiroceras Meek, 1876

= Spiroceratidae =

Extinct genus of ammonites

Spiroceratidae is a family of extinct ammonites.
