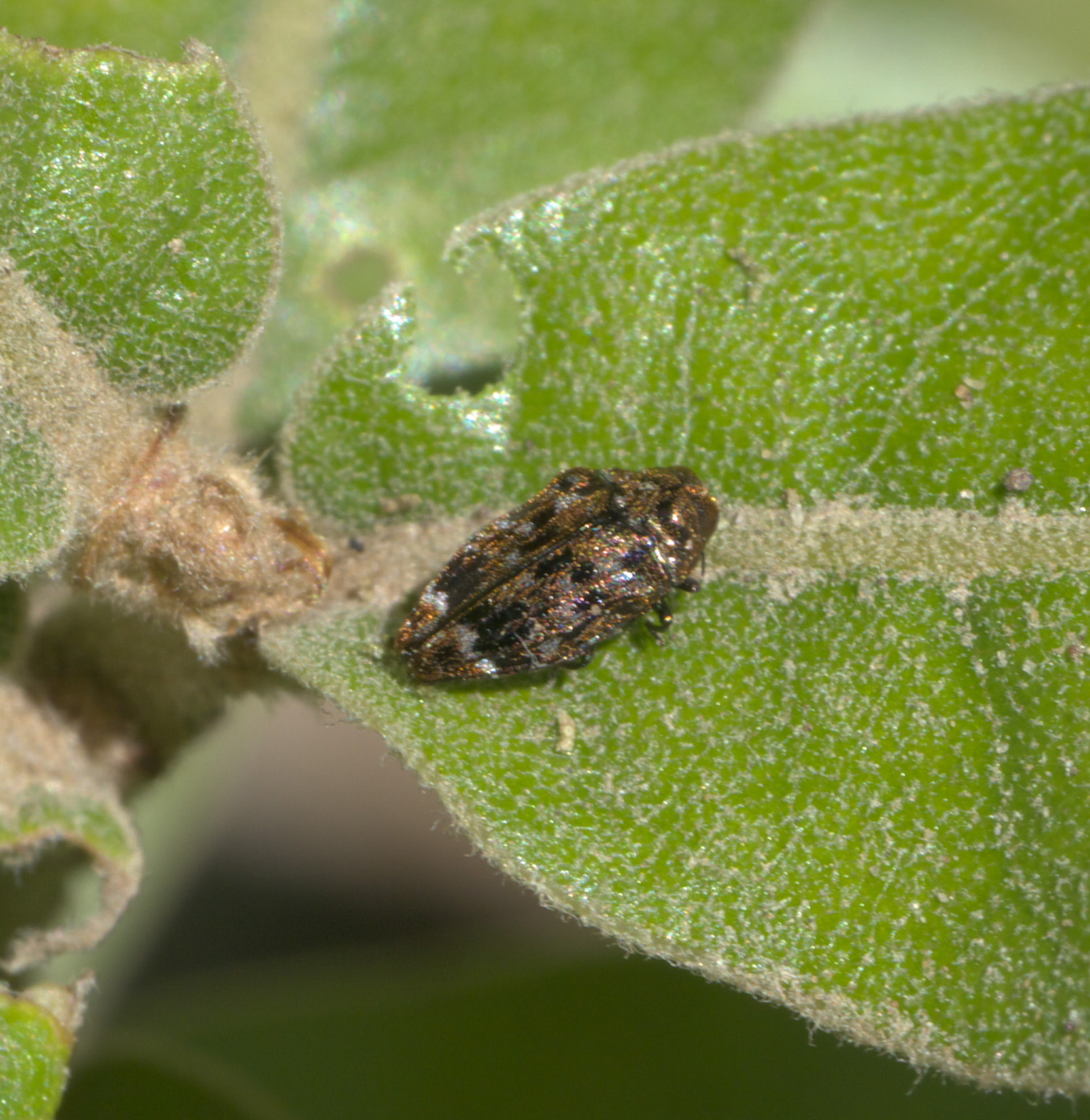
- Brachys ovatus

Scientific classification
- Kingdom: Animalia
- Phylum: Arthropoda
- Class: Insecta
- Order: Coleoptera
- Suborder: Polyphaga
- Infraorder: Elateriformia
- Family: Buprestidae
- Subfamily: Agrilinae
- Tribe: Tracheini
- Subtribe: Brachina
- Genus: Brachys; Dejean, 1833

Diversity
- at least 140 species

= Brachys =

Genus of beetles

Brachys is a genus of metallic wood-boring beetles in the family Buprestidae. There are at least 140 described species in Brachys.

== See also ==
- List of Brachys species
